= List of moderators of the General Assembly of the Church of Scotland =

List of moderators of the General Assembly of the Church of Scotland is a complete list of moderators of the General Assembly of the Church of Scotland from the Reformation to the present day. The location of the parish or other post during the moderator's year in office is listed in brackets.

Since 1714 the General Assembly has normally been held annually every May. Moderators-designate are nominated in the October of the previous year; a formal vote is taken at start of the General Assembly in May, then the new moderator takes the chair. They hold office for one year; their final act is to formally open the following year's General Assembly and preside over the formal election of a successor.

The moderator of the current year, while serving their term as moderator, is styled "The Right Reverend", while past moderators are styled "The Very Reverend".

Following the death of Rev. James Harkness in August 2026, Rev. John Cairns, who was Moderator in 1999, is the Moderator whose time in office was the earliest.

== 16th century ==
- 1562 (June) and 1568 (Dec) John Knox (Edinburgh)
- 1563 (Dec.), 1564 (June) and 1568 (July) John Willock (Superintendent of the West)
- 1564 (Dec.), 1565 (Dec.), 1566 (June and Dec) and 1572 (Aug) John Erskine of Dun (Superintendent of Angus and Mearns)
- 1567 (June) George Buchanan (Principal, St Leonard's College, University of St Andrews)
- 1567 (July and Dec.), 1576 (April), 1578 (June) John Row (St Johnstoun)
- 1569 (Feb.), 1577 (Oct.), 1582 (October), 1586 (May), 1593 (April) and 1597 (March) David Lindsay (Leith)
- 1569 (July) William Christison (St Mary's Church, Dundee)
- 1570 (March), 1576 (October), 1581 (October) John Craig (Edinburgh)
- 1570 (July), 1575 (August), 1581 (April), 1583 (October), 1595 (March) and 1597 (April) Robert Pont (Edinburgh: St Cuthbert's)
- 1571 (March) George Hay (Rathven)
- 1571 (August) Gilbert Garden (Fordyce)
- 1572 (March) Robert Hamilton (St Andrews) (note: Scott says March 1571)
- 1573 (March) and 1578 (October) David Ferguson (Dunfermline)
- 1573 (August) and 1577 (April) Alexander Arbuthnot (Principal of King's College, Aberdeen)
- 1574 (March) and 1580 (October) Andrew Hay (Renfrew)
- 1574 (August) John Duncanson (Minister at the King's House)
- 1575 (March) James Boyd of Trochrig (Archbishop of Glasgow)
- 1578 (April), 1582 (April and June), 1587 and 1594 Andrew Melville (Principal of the College, Glasgow)
- 1579 (July) and 1583 (April) Thomas Smeton (Minister at Paisley, later Principal of the University of Glasgow)
- 1580 (July) James Lawson (Edinburgh)
- 1588 (Feb.) and 1592 Robert Bruce (Edinburgh)
- 1588 (Aug.) Thomas Buchanan (Ceres)
- 1589 (June) and 1590 (March) James Melville (Anstruther, Fife)
- 1590 (August) and 1602 Patrick Galloway (Minister at the King's House)
- 1591 Nicol Dalgleish (Pittenweem)
- 1595 and 1606 James Nicolson (Meigle, later Bishop of Dunkeld)
- 1597 (March) Peter Blackburn (Aberdeen, later Bishop of Aberdeen)
- 1597 (May) Robert Rollock (Principal of the College of Edinburgh)
- 1600 Robert Wilkie (Principal of St Leonard's College, St Andrews)

== 17th century ==
- 1601 John Hall (St Giles, Edinburgh)
- 1602,1604 and 1607 Alexander Hume (Logie Kirk)
- 1605 John Forbes (Alford, Aberdeenshire) – and David Rait Moderator of Synod at Aberdeen Assembly
- 1606 James Nicolson (Meigle, later Bishop of Dunkeld) elected as "Constant Moderator" in election against Patrick Simson but the concept was dropped
- 1608 James Law (Bishop of Orkney, later Archbishop of Glasgow)
- 1610, 1616, 1617 and 1618 John Spottiswood (Archbishop of Glasgow, later Archbishop of St Andrews)
- 1613 Robert Roche (Inverkeithing)
- 1615 James Saitonne or Seytoun (Logie Kirk) (Note- Scott has no record of this)
- 1615 to 1627 John Hay (Renfrew) as the first "constant Moderator"

No General Assembly until 1638

- 1638, 1641 and 1643 Alexander Henderson (Leuchars, later Edinburgh)
- 1639, 1652 and (?)1653 David Dickson (Irvine, Ayrshire)
- 1640 Andrew Ramsay (Edinburgh)
- 1642, 1645, 1647, 1649, 1651 Robert Douglas (Edinburgh)
- 1644 James Bonar (Maybole, Ayrshire)
- 1646 Robert Blair (St Andrews)
- 1647 Robert Douglas (Edinburgh)
- 1648 George Gillespie (Edinburgh)
- 1650 Andrew Cant (Aberdeen)
- 1651 Robert Douglas
- 1652 Gabriel Cunningham (Dunlop, Irvine) (or David Dickson?)

No General Assembly after 1653 until the restoration of Presbyterianism in 1690. From 1662 to 1673 Walter Bruce of Inverkeithing was "Constant Moderator. Patrick Sympson was Constant Moderator from an unknown date to Spring 1690. Gabriel Cunningham acted as Interim Moderator in 1690 (as though there had been no gap) until Kennedie was chosen to succeed him.

- 1690 Hugh Kennedie (Edinburgh: Trinity College Church)
- 1692 and 1697 William Crichton (Edinburgh: Tron Church)
- 1694 John Law (Edinburgh: High Church)
- 1695 Patrick Simson (Renfrew)
- 1698 and 1703 George Meldrum (Edinburgh: Tron Church and Professor of Divinity, Edinburgh)
- 1699 George Hamilton (Edinburgh: High Church)
- 1700 David Blair (Edinburgh: Old Church)

== 18th century ==
- 1701 and 1704 Thomas Wilkie (Edinburgh: Canongate)
- 1702 David Williamson (Edinburgh: St Cuthbert's) aka "Dainty Davie"
- 1703 George Meldrum, (Tron, Edinburgh)
- 1705, 1708, 1711 and 1715 William Carstares (Principal of the College of Edinburgh)
- 1706, 1713, 1718, 1724 and 1728 William Wishart (South Leith, later Principal of the College of Edinburgh)
- 1707 John Stirling (Principal of the University of Glasgow)
- 1709 John Currie (Haddington)
- 1710, 1714, 1717, 1722 and 1726 William Mitchell (Edinburgh: High Church)- the first Second Charge to become Moderator
- 1712, 1716, 1720, 1727 and 1730 William Hamilton (Professor of Divinity, later Principal of the University of Edinburgh)
- 1719 James Grierson (Second Charge in Edinburgh: Trinity College Church)
- 1721 Thomas Black (St John's Church, Perth)
- 1723 and 1731 James Smith (Cramond; later Principal of the University of Edinburgh)
- 1725 and 1729 James Alston (Dirleton)
- 1732 and 1737 Neil Campbell (Principal of the University of Glasgow)
- 1733 John Gowdie (Edinburgh: New North, also Principal of the University of Edinburgh)
- 1734 James Gordon (Alford)
- 1735 Alexander Anderson (St Andrews)
- 1738 and 1741 James Ramsay (Kelso)
- 1739 James Bannatine (Edinburgh: Trinity College Church)
- 1740 George Logan (Edinburgh: Trinity College Church)
- 1742 Thomas Tullideph (Principal, St Leonard's College, St Andrews)
- 1743 Robert Wallace (Edinburgh: New North)
- 1744 John Adams (Falkirk)
- 1745 William Wishart (Principal (Secundus) of the University of Edinburgh)
- 1746 John Lumsden of Auchinleck (Professor of Divinity, King's College, Aberdeen)
- 1747 Robert Kinloch (Edinburgh: High Church)
- 1748 George Wishart (Edinburgh: Tron Church)
- 1749, 1752 and 1756 Patrick Cumin (Edinburgh: Old Church, also Professor of Church History)
- 1750 Robert Patoun (Renfrew)
- 1751 James Mackie (St Ninians, Stirling)
- 1753 Alexander Webster (Edinburgh: Tolbooth)
- 1754 and 1760 Robert Hamilton (Professor of Divinity, Edinburgh) and minister of Old Greyfriars Kirk
- 1755 George Reid (St Quivox)
- 1757 William Leechman (Professor of Divinity, later Principal of the University of Glasgow)
- 1758 Thomas Turnbull (Borthwick)
- 1760 George Kay (Edinburgh: Old Greyfriars')
- 1761 John Hyndman (Lady Yester's Church) note – Scott does not record this moderatorship
- 1762 Robert Trail (Professor of Divinity, University of Glasgow)
- 1763 William Robertson (Edinburgh: Old Greyfriars, also Principal of the University of Edinburgh)
- 1764 Alexander Gerard (Professor of Theology, Marischal College, Aberdeen)
- 1765 James Oswald (Methven)
- 1766 John Hamilton (Glasgow: St Mungo's High Church)
- 1767 James Murison (Principal of the New College, University of St Andrews)
- 1768 Gilbert Hamilton (Cramond, near Edinburgh)
- 1769 James MacKnight (Maybole)
- 1770 Alexander Carlyle (Inveresk)
- 1771 Robert Walker (Edinburgh: The High Kirk)
- 1772 Adam Fergusson (Moulin)
- 1773 and 1784 John Drysdale FRSE (Edinburgh: Tron)
- 1774 Robert Henry (Edinburgh: New Greyfriars')
- 1775 David Shaw (Coylton)
- 1776 John Ker (Forfar)
- 1777 James Brown (Edinburgh: New (West) Kirk, St Giles)
- 1778 Patrick Grant (Urray)
- 1779 James Gillespie (St Andrews)
- 1780 Harry Spens (East Wemyss)
- 1781 William Dalrymple (Ayr)
- 1782 Joseph McCormick (Prestonpans, later Principal of St Leonard's College, University of St Andrews)
- 1783 Henry Grieve (Dalkeith)
- 1785 Henry Moncrieff-Wellwood, Bart., (Edinburgh: West)
- 1786 Duncan Shaw (Aberdeen North)
- 1787 Robert Liston (Aberdour) (last to be elected without DD)
- 1788 Archibald Davidson (Principal of the University of Glasgow)
- 1789 George Hill (Professor of Divinity, University of St Andrews)
- 1790 John Walker (Professor of Natural History, Edinburgh)
- 1791 Robert Small (Dundee, St Mary's), Mathematician and Astronomer
- 1792 Andrew Hunter (Professor of Divinity, University of Edinburgh])
- 1793 Thomas Hardy (Professor of Church History, University of Edinburgh)
- 1794 Robert Arnot (Professor of Divinity, University of St Andrews)
- 1795 James Meek (Cambuslang), Historian and Meteorologist
- 1796 William Greenfield (Edinburgh: High Church, also Professor of Rhetoric at the University of Edinburgh)
- 1797 John Adamson (St Andrews) Professor of Civil History in the United College, University of St Andrews
- 1798 William Taylor (Glasgow: High, also Principal of the University of Glasgow)
- 1799 William Moodie (Edinburgh: St Andrew's, also Professor of Hebrew at the University of Edinburgh)
- 1800 George Baird (Principal, University of Edinburgh)

== 19th century ==
- 1801 William Ritchie (Kilwinning)
- 1802 James Finlayson (Edinburgh: High Church, also Professor of Logic at the University of Edinburgh)
- 1803 Gilbert Gerard (Professor of Divinity, King's College, Aberdeen)
- 1804 John Inglis (Greyfriars Kirk, Edinburgh)
- 1805 George Hamilton (Gladsmuir) Following William McQuhae's rejection of the role
- 1806 William Taylor (St Enoch's, Glasgow)
- 1807 James Sherriffs (Aberdeen)
- 1808 Andrew Grant (Kilmarnock)
- 1809 Francis Nicoll (Mains and Strathmartine east of Dundee – later Principal of St Leonard's College, St Andrews)
- 1810 Hugh Meiklejohn (Abercorn, also Professor of Church History at the University of Edinburgh)
- 1811 Alexander Ranken (St David's (Ramshorn) Church, Glasgow)
- 1812 William MacMorine (Caerlaverock) instead of Robert Dickson of South Leith Parish Church who declined Moderatorship
- 1813 Andrew Brown (Edinburgh: Old Church, also Professor of Rhetoric at the University of Edinburgh)
- 1814 David Ritchie (Edinburgh: St Andrew's, also Professor of Logic at the University of Edinburgh)
- 1815 Lewis Gordon (Drainie)
- 1816 John Cook (of Kilmany then Professor of Hebrew, then Biblical Criticism at St Andrews)
- 1817 Gavin Gibb (Glasgow: St Andrew's, also Professor of Hebrew, University of Glasgow)
- 1818 John Campbell (Tolbooth parish, Edinburgh)
- 1819 and 1843 Duncan Macfarlan (Drymen, later Principal of the University of Glasgow)
- 1820 Thomas MacKnight (Edinburgh: Old Church)
- 1821 Duncan Mearns (Professor of Divinity, University of Aberdeen)
- 1822 David Lamont (Kirkpatrick Durham)
- 1823 Alexander Brunton (Edinburgh: Tron Kirk, also Professor of Oriental Languages, University of Edinburgh)
- 1824 Andrew Duncan (Ratho)
- 1825 George Cook (Laurencekirk)
- 1826 Thomas Taylor (Tibbermore)
- 1827 Robert Haldane (Principal, St Mary's College, University of St Andrews)
- 1828 Stevenson McGill (Professor of Divinity, University of Glasgow)
- 1829 Patrick Forbes (Oldmachar)
- 1830 William Singer (Kirkpatrick-Juxta)
- 1831 James Wallace (Whitekirk)
- 1832 Thomas Chalmers (Professor of Divinity, University of Edinburgh)
- 1833 John Stirling (Craigie, South Ayrshire)
- 1834 Patrick MacFarlan (West Kirk Greenock)
- 1835 William Aird Thomson (Perth)
- 1836 Norman Macleod (The Highlanders' Friend) (Glasgow: St Columba)
- 1837 Matthew Gardiner (Bothwell)
- 1838 William Muir (Edinburgh: St Stephen's)
- 1839 Henry Duncan (Ruthwell)
- 1840 Angus Makellar (Pencaitland)
- 1841 Robert Gordon (Edinburgh: High Church)
- 1842 David Welsh (Professor of Church History, University of Edinburgh)

== Post Disruption ==
The "Disruption" in the Church of Scotland took place in 1843, with approximately one-third of the ministers leaving to form the Free Church of Scotland. The Moderator in this critical year was Duncan Macfarlan (High Church of Glasgow)

- 1844 John Lee (Principal, University of Edinburgh)
- 1845 Alexander Hill (Professor of Divinity, University of Glasgow)
- 1846 James Paull (Tullynessle)
- 1847 John Paul (Edinburgh: West Kirk)
- 1848 George Buist (Professor of Church History, University of St Andrews)
- 1849 Alexander Lockhart Simpson (Kirknewton)
- 1850 John Graham of Balfunning (Killearn)
- 1851 John Macleod (Morvern)
- 1852 Lewis William Forbes (Boharm)
- 1853 James Barr (Glasgow: St Enoch's)
- 1854 James Grant (Edinburgh: St Mary's)
- 1855 Andrew Bell (Linlithgow)
- 1856 John Crombie (Scone)
- 1857 James Robertson (Professor of Church History, University of Edinburgh)
- 1858 Matthew Leishman (Govan)
- 1859 Prof John Cook (Professor of Church History, University of St Andrews)
- 1860 James Maitland (Kells, Dumfries and Galloway)
- 1861 Colin Smith (Glenaray near Inveraray)
- 1862 James Bisset (Bourtie)
- 1863 James Craik (Glasgow: St George's)
- 1864 William Robinson Pirie (Principal, University of Aberdeen)
- 1865 James Macfarlane (Duddingston, near Edinburgh)
- 1866 John Cook (Haddington)
- 1867 Thomas Jackson Crawford, (Professor of Divinity, University of Edinburgh)
- 1868 James Strachan Barty (Bendochy)
- 1869 Norman MacLeod (Glasgow: The Barony)
- 1870 George Ritchie (Jedburgh)
- 1871 Robert Horne Stevenson (Edinburgh: St George's)
- 1872 Robert Jamieson (Glasgow: St Paul's)
- 1873 Robert Gillan (Inchinnan)
- 1874 Samuel Trail (Professor of Divinity, University of Aberdeen)
- 1875 James Sellar (Aberlour)
- 1876 George Cook (Borgue)
- 1877 Kenneth Macleay Phin (Convener of the Home Mission Committee)
- 1878 John Tulloch (Principal, St Mary's College, University of St Andrews)
- 1879 James Crystal (Auchinleck)
- 1880 Archibald Watson (St Mary's, Dundee)
- 1881 James Smith (Cathcart)
- 1882 William Milligan (Professor of Biblical Criticism, University of Aberdeen)
- 1883 John Rankine (Sorn)
- 1884 Peter MacKenzie (Urquhart in Presbytery of Dingwall)
- 1885 Alexander Ferrier Mitchell (Professor of Church History, University of UniversSt Andrews)
- 1886 John Cunningham (Principal, St Mary's College, University of St Andrews)
- 1887 George Hutchison (Banchory-Ternan)
- 1888 William Henry Gray (Liberton)
- 1889 Paton James Gloag (Galashiels)
- 1890 A. K. H. Boyd (St Andrews)
- 1891 James MacGregor (Edinburgh: St Cuthbert's)
- 1892 Archibald Charteris (University of Edinburgh)
- 1893 J. Marshall Lang (Glasgow: The Barony)
- 1894 Robert Herbert Story (Principal of the University of Glasgow)
- 1895 Donald Macleod (Glasgow: Park Church) after post declined by Robert Flint
- 1896 Archibald Scott (Edinburgh: St George's)
- 1897 William Mair (Earlston)
- 1898 Thomas Leishman (Linton)
- 1899 John Pagan (Bothwell)
- 1900 Norman Macleod (Inverness)

== 20th century ==
- 1901 James Mitchell (South Leith)
- 1902 James Curdie Russell (Campbeltown)
- 1903 John Gillespie (Mouswald)
- 1904 John McMurtrie (Convener, Committee on Foreign Missions)
- 1905 Andrew J. Milne (Fyvie)
- 1906 Thomas Brown William Niven (Pollokshields)
- 1907 James Robert Mitford Mitchell (Convener, Colonial Committee)
- 1908 Theodore Marshall (Convener, Home Mission Committee)
- 1909 James Robertson (Whittingehame)
- 1910 Pearson McAdam Muir (Glasgow Cathedral)
- 1911 Alexander Stewart (Principal of St Mary's College, University of St Andrews)
- 1912 Samuel Marcus Dill (Alloway)
- 1913 Andrew Wallace Williamson (Edinburgh: High Kirk (St Giles’ Cathedral))
- 1914 Thomas Nicol (Professor of Biblical Criticism, University Aberdeen)
- 1915 David Paul (Edinburgh: Robertson Memorial Church)
- 1916 John Brown (Glasgow: Bellahouston)
- 1917 James Cooper (Professor of Church History, University of Glasgow)
- 1918 James Nicoll Ogilvie (Edinburgh: New Greyfriars')
- 1919 William Paterson Paterson (University of Edinburgh)
- 1920 Thomas Martin (Peebles)
- 1921 James A. McClymont (Convener of the Committee on Chaplains to H. M. Forces)
- 1922 John Smith (Glasgow: Partick)
- 1923 George Milligan (University of Glasgow)
- 1924 David Cathels (Hawick)
- 1925 John White (Glasgow: The Barony)(also served in 1929)
- 1926 John Donaldson McCallum (Larkhall)
- 1927 Norman Maclean (Edinburgh: St Cuthbert's)
- 1928 James Montgomery Campbell (Dumfries)
- 1929 Joseph Mitchell (Mauchline)

The union of the Church of Scotland and the United Free Church of Scotland occurred in 1929, the newly reunited church henceforth being known as the Church of Scotland.

- 1929 John White (Glasgow: The Barony)(also served in 1925)
- 1930 Andrew Nisbet Bogle (Joint-Secretary, Church and Ministry Department)
- 1931 John Anderson Graham (Kalimpong, India) (Founder of Dr. Graham's Homes)
- 1932 Hugh Ross Mackintosh (Professor of Dogmatics, University of Edinburgh)
- 1933 Lauchlan MacLean Watt (Glasgow Cathedral)
- 1934 Peter Donald Thomson (Glasgow: Kelvinside (Botanic Gardens))
- 1935 Marshall B. Lang (Whittingehame)
- 1936 Daniel Lamont (Professor of Practical Theology, New College, Edinburgh)
- 1937 Dugald MacFarlane (Kingussie)
- 1938 James Black (Edinburgh: St George's West)
- 1939 Archibald Main (Glasgow)
- 1940 James Rae Forgan (Ayr: Trinity UF)
- 1941 J. H. Cockburn (Dunblane Cathedral)
- 1942 Charles William Gray Taylor (Edinburgh: St George's)
- 1943 John Baillie (Professor of Divinity, University of Edinburgh)
- 1944 Edward James Hagan (Edinburgh: Warrender)
- 1945 A. J. Campbell (Evie, Orkney)
- 1946 John McKenzie (former Principal, The Wilson College, Bombay, India)
- 1947 Matthew Stewart (Hamilton Old and Auchingramont)
- 1948 Alexander Macdonald (Glasgow: St Columba)
- 1949 George Simpson Duncan (University of St Andrews)
- 1950 Hugh Watt (University of Edinburgh)
- 1951 William White Anderson (Edinburgh: St Cuthbert's)
- 1952 George Johnstone Jeffrey (Glasgow: Sherbrooke St Gilbert's)
- 1953 James Pitt-Watson (Glasgow)
- 1954 Ernest David Jarvis (Glasgow: Wellington)
- 1955 G. D. Henderson (University of Aberdeen)
- 1956 Robert F. V. Scott (St Columba's Church, London)
- 1957 George MacLeod (Iona Community) (Peerage in 1967: Lord MacLeod of Fuinary)
- 1958 John A. Fraser (Hamilton Old and Auchingramont)
- 1959 Robert Henry Wishart Shepherd (Lovedale (South Africa))
- 1960 J. H. S. Burleigh (University of Edinburgh)
- 1961 Archibald Campbell Craig (University of Glasgow)
- 1962 Nevile Davidson (Glasgow Cathedral)
- 1963 James Stuart Stewart (Edinburgh)
- 1964 Duncan Fraser (Invergordon)
- 1965 Archibald Watt (Edzell and Lethnot)
- 1966 Leonard Small (Edinburgh: St Cuthbert's)
- 1967 William Roy Sanderson (Stenton linked with Whittinghame)
- 1968 James Boyd Longmuir (Principal Clerk to the General Assembly)
- 1969 Thomas Moffat Murchison (Glasgow: St Columba Summertown)
- 1970 Hugh O. Douglas (Dundee: St Mary's)
- 1971 Andrew Herron (Clerk to the Presbytery of Glasgow)
- 1972 Ronald Selby Wright (Edinburgh: Canongate)
- 1973 George T. H. Reid (Aberdeen: Langstane)
- 1974 David Steel (Linlithgow: St Michael's) (Father of Lord Steel of Aikwood)
- 1975 James Gunn Matheson (Portree (Isle of Skye))
- 1976 Thomas F. Torrance (University of Edinburgh)
- 1977 John Rodger Gray (Dunblane Cathedral)
- 1978 Peter Brodie (Alloa: St Mungo's)
- 1979 Robert A. S. Barbour (University of Aberdeen)
- 1980 William Bryce Johnston (Edinburgh: Colinton)
- 1981 Andrew Beveridge Doig (National Bible Society of Scotland)
- 1982 John McIntyre (University of Edinburgh)
- 1983 J. Fraser McLuskey (London: St Columba's)
- 1984 John M. K. Paterson (Milngavie: St Paul's)
- 1985 David M. B. A. Smith (Logie, by Stirling)
- 1986 Robert Craig (Jerusalem (Emeritus))
- 1987 Duncan Shaw Bundesverdienstkreuz (Edinburgh: Craigentinny St Christopher's)
- 1988 James A. Whyte (University of St Andrews)
- 1989 William J. G. McDonald (Edinburgh: Mayfield)
- 1990 Robert Davidson (University of Glasgow)
- 1991 William B. R. Macmillan (Dundee: St Mary's)
- 1992 Hugh R. Wyllie (Hamilton: Old Parish Church)
- 1993 James L. Weatherhead (Principal Clerk to the General Assembly)
- 1994 James A. Simpson (Dornoch Cathedral)
- 1995 James Harkness (Chaplain General of Her Majesty's Forces (Emeritus))
- 1996 John H. McIndoe (London: St Columba's linked with Newcastle: St Andrew's)
- 1997 Alexander McDonald (General Secretary of the CofS Board of Ministry)
- 1998 Alan Main (University of Aberdeen)
- 1999 John B. Cairns (Dumbarton: Riverside)
- 2000 Andrew McLellan (Edinburgh: St Andrew's & St George's)

== 21st century ==
- 2001 John Miller (Glasgow: Castlemilk East)
- 2002 Finlay Macdonald (Principal Clerk to the General Assembly)
- 2003 Iain Torrance (Professor, University of Aberdeen)
- 2004 Alison Elliot (Elder, Session Clerk at Edinburgh: Greyfriars Tolbooth & Highland Kirk, Associate Secretary of the Centre for Theology & Public Issues at the University of Edinburgh, first woman to be Moderator and first non-minister to be Moderator since the 16th century)
- 2005 David Lacy (Kilmarnock: Henderson)
- 2006 Alan McDonald (Cameron linked with St Andrews: St Leonard's)
- 2007 Sheilagh M. Kesting (Secretary of the Committee on Ecumenical Relations, first woman minister to serve as Moderator)
- 2008 David W. Lunan (Clerk to the Presbytery of Glasgow)
- 2009 William C. Hewitt (Greenock: Westburn)
- 2010 John Christie (Interim Minister at West Kilbride: St Andrews and the Scots Kirk, Lausanne)
- 2011 A. David K. Arnott (retired, formerly at St Andrews: Hope Park linked with Strathkinness)
- 2012 Albert O. Bogle (Bo'ness: St Andrew's)
- 2013 E. Lorna Hood (Renfrew: North)
- 2014 John Chalmers (Principal Clerk to the General Assembly) (Angus Morrison (Orwell and Portmoak) was initially nominated but withdrew on health grounds)
- 2015 Angus Morrison (Orwell and Portmoak)
- 2016 Russell Barr (Edinburgh: Cramond)
- 2017 Derek Browning (Edinburgh: Morningside)
- 2018 Susan M. Brown (Dornoch Cathedral)
- 2019 Colin Sinclair (Edinburgh: Palmerston Place)
- 2020 W. Martin Fair (Arbroath: St Andrew's)
- 2021 Jim Wallace, Baron Wallace of Tankerness (Elder at St. Magnus Cathedral, Kirkwall)
- 2022 Iain Greenshields (Dunfermline: St Margaret's)
- 2023 Sally Foster-Fulton (Head of Christian Aid Scotland)
- 2024 Shaw Paterson (Strathaven: Trinity)
- 2025 Rosemary Frew (Bowden and Melrose)
- 2026 Gordon Kennedy (Edinburgh: Craiglockhart)

== Moderators who were later moderators of the Free Church ==
- Thomas Chalmers (1832) – Moderator of Free Church in 1843
- Patrick MacFarlan (1834) – Moderator of Free Church in 1845
- Angus Makellar (1840) – Moderator of the Free Church in 1852

== See also ==
- Lord High Commissioner to the General Assembly of the Church of Scotland
- Moderators and Clerks of the Church of Scotland

== Sources ==
- Church of Scotland Yearbook 1908 edition, 1933 edition, 1966 edition and 2003–04 edition ISBN 0-86153-353-4. The 1908 yearbook entries (1560–1908) were compiled by the late Rev Dr Robert W. Weir.

== Note ==
- DD – Doctor of Divinity. See also List of post-nominal letters.
