= John Hay (moderator) =

Moderator of the Church of Scotland

John Hay of Renfield (1566–1627) was a Scottish minister who served as Constant Moderator of the General Assembly of the Church of Scotland in from 1605 (or 1615) to 1627. He also served five times as Rector of the University of Glasgow.

== Life ==
Hay was born in Renfrew the son of Andrew Hay and Janet Wallace of Craigie. His paternal grandfather was William Hay, fourth Laird of Talla in Tweedsmuir. His paternal uncle, George Hay of Rathven, was Moderator in 1571. He studied at Glasgow University graduating MA in 1588.

Hay was ordained as minister of Mearns in 1588. In 1593 he returned to replace his father as minister of Renfrew. For five periods between 1594 and 1613 he also (as his father before) served as Rector of the University of Glasgow.

In 1615, Hay succeeded the Robert Roche of Inverkeithing as Moderator of the General Assembly of the Church of Scotland the highest position in the Scottish Church. It is noted that since 1605 the Assembly had tried to introduce a more permanent moderator, known as "constant moderator". Hay was the first to be given this role, but it ceased again on his death. It did not rematerialise until 1662 with Walter Bruce. From his death there was an inter-regnum in the chain of Moderators until 1638.

He died in Renfrew in December 1627. His position as minister of Renfrew was filled by his son Hohn Hay, creating three consecutive Hays as minister.

== Family ==
Hay married twice: firstly around 1596 to Margaret Hamilton (d.1601), daughter of Claud Hamilton of Cochno in West Dunbartonshire. They had two sons: John Hay (1597-1668), minister of Renfrew 1628 to 1649), and Andrew Hay of Inchnoch.

Following Margaret's death in 1601, in August 1602 he married Agnes Somerville, daughter of John Somerville of Tarbrax. They had three daughters and a son together. On John's death Agnes married Matthew Wallace of Dundonald. Her daughter Jean married Matthew's son, James Wallace of Dundonald.
