= Andrew Milne =

Andrew Milne may refer to:

- Andrew J. Milne (died 1906), Scottish educator and minister who served as Moderator of the General Assembly of the Church of Scotland
- Andrew Milne (footballer) (born 1990), English former professional footballer
- Andrew Milne (solicitor) (born 1963), British solicitor who was sanctioned by the Solicitors Regulation Authority following a stalking conviction
