= Andrew Hay =

Andrew or Andy Hay may refer to:

- Andrew Hay (British Army officer) (1762–1814), British Army officer
- Andrew Hay (footballer) (1909–?), Scottish footballer
- Andrew K. Hay (1809–1881), American Whig politician
- Andy Hay (chef), Canadian chef and television personality
- Andy Hay (rugby league) (born 1973), rugby league footballer and coach
- Andy Hay (rowing) (born 1964), New Zealand rowing coxswain
- Andrew Hay, 8th Earl of Erroll (1531–1585), Scottish nobleman and politician
- Andrew Leith Hay (1785–1862), Scottish soldier, politician and writer on architecture
- Andrew Hay (moderator) (c.1540–1593), Scottish minister
