= Robert Hamilton (moderator, died 1581) =

Church of Scotland minister and moderator 1572

Robert Hamilton (c.1530–1581) was a Church of Scotland minister who served as Moderator of the General Assembly in 1572 and was Principal of New College in St Andrews.

== Life ==
Little is known of his early life. He was probably born around 1530 in eastern central Scotland. He is first mentioned in the first General Assembly of the Church of Scotland in December 1560 where he is minuted as being "maist (most) qualified for ministering and teaching".

From at least 1560 he was a Regent of New College in St Andrews (now known as St Mary's College, St Andrews) which means this is certainly where he studied. As a Regent he would lecture in Divinity to the younger students. From around 1570 he was Principal of the College.

At some time between November 1565 and September 1566 he became minister of St Andrews Parish Church, in place of Christopher Goodman. This was one of the most important ecclesiastical positions in Scotland.

In 1572 he succeeded Gilbert Garden of Fordyce, Aberdeenshire as Moderator of the General Assembly of the Church of Scotland the highest position in the Scottish church. He attended 26 out of the 31 General Assemblies occurring during his ministry.

In 1576 the General Assembly ordered him to give up the Principalship as they perceived a conflict with his ministry. He refused to comply with this order.

He died in Edinburgh on 16 April 1581.

== Family ==
He married Elspeth Traill (died 1595) daughter of John Traill the younger of Magask. They had at least four children.

Following Hamilton's death, Elspeth married Thomas Buchanan, minister of Ceres and Moderator in 1588.
