= Thomas Buchanan =

Thomas (or Tom) Buchanan is the name of:

- Thomas Buchanan (moderator) (died 1599) Moderator of the General Assembly of the Church of Scotland in 1588
- Thomas Buchanan (Liberal politician) (1846–1911), Scottish Liberal politician, Under-Secretary of State for India
- Thomas Buchanan (Unionist politician) (born 1963), Northern Ireland politician
- Thomas Buchanan (Governor of Liberia) (1808–1841), first governor of Liberia and cousin of James Buchanan, president of the United States
- Thomas Buchanan (priest) (1833–1924), Archdeacon of Wilts from 1874 until 1911
- Thomas C. Buchanan, Chairman of the Federal Power Commission from 1952-53
- Thomas Buchanan Read (1822–1872), American poet and painter
- Tom Buchanan (historian) (born 1960), British historian
- Tom Buchanan, a fictional character in The Great Gatsby
- Tom Buchanan, a contestant on Survivor (American TV series)
