= Hugh Kennedie =

Scottish minister

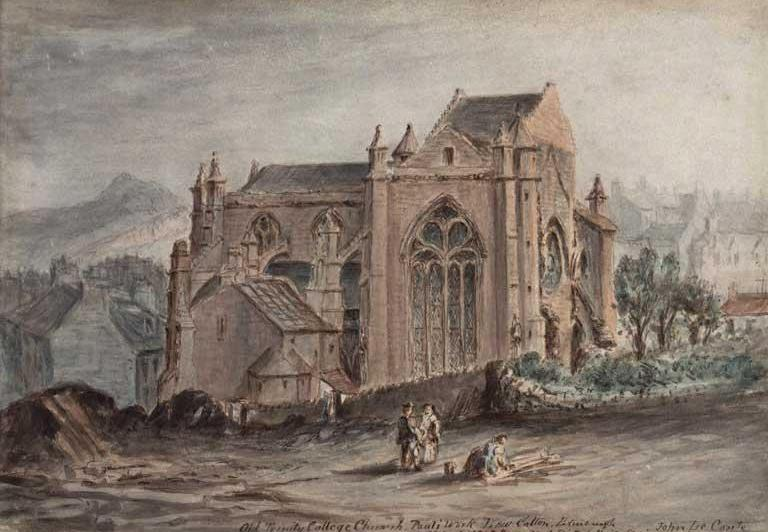
Trinity College Church in Edinburgh

Hugh Kennedie or Kennedy (c.1620–1692) was a Scottish minister of the Church of Scotland who served as Moderator of the General Assembly in 1690.

== Life ==
He was from Easter Inch in Bathgate.

He studied divinity at St Andrews University and Glasgow University graduating MA in 1641. He was ordained as minister of West Calder in the Presbytery of Linlithgow in 1643. He was deposed due to the difficulties between politics and religion in 1660 but returned in 1687 and became minister of Trinity College Church in Edinburgh.

On 16 October 1690 he was elected the first post-Revolution Moderator of the General Assembly under the renewed annual election system following the 30-year gap in tradition, during which it is often forgotten that a "Constant Moderator" was elected, covering much longer periods, such as Walter Bruce of Inverkeithing who served 1662 to 1673. His immediate predecessor was Gabriel Cunningham who filled a short gap of around 3 months between Constant Moderator and Moderator.

At this time the Moderator acted under partial control of a "Commissioner" a more political role. The Commissioner for 1690 to 1692 was John Lord Carmichael.

Under the new system he was appointed for two years and he was succeeded by William Crichton in 1692.

He died in Edinburgh on 25 April 1692 whilst still in office as minister of Trinity College Kirk, and was buried in Greyfriars Kirkyard.

== Family ==
He married twice, firstly around 1648 to Margaret Buchanan, secondly in 1662 to Margaret Douglas. The latter was daughter of Joseph Douglas and Jean Sandilands, granddaughter of Lord Torphichen.

By the first marriage he had a son, John Kennedie (b.1654). His daughter Jean, by his second marriage, married Hugh Campbell. Also John (b.1649); Hew (b.1652); Thomas (b.1654); Margaret (b.1657); William (b.1658)
