= James Mackie (moderator) =

Church of Scotland minister and historian

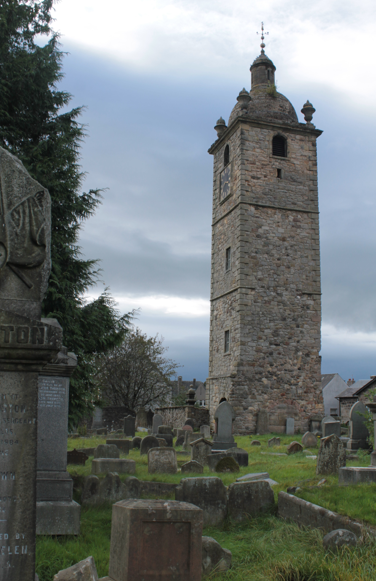
St Ninian's Clock Tower, Stirling

James Mackie (1685–1765) was a Church of Scotland minister and historian who served as Moderator of the General Assembly in 1751.

== Life ==
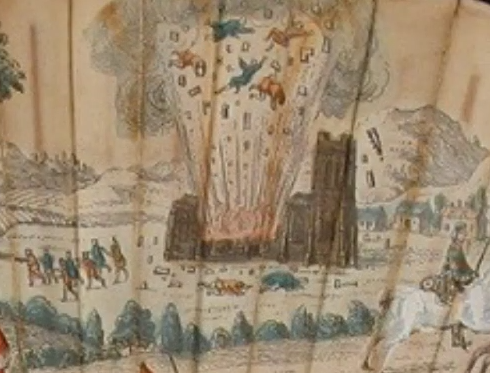
The destruction of St Ninian's Church by explosion in 1746 (shown on a contemporary fan)

He was licensed by the Presbytery of Dalkeith in 1719 and ordained as minister of Forteviot in March 1720.

In 1734 he translated from Forteviot to St Ninian's Parish, south of Stirling, under the patronage of King George II. He remained there for the remainder of his life.

During his period of occupancy, in 1746 St Ninian's Church was blown up as part of the Jacobite Uprising of 1745. The Jacobite forces at gathered on the morning of 1 February 1746 at the church, but Bonnie Prince Charlie was late to arrive. They were trying to organise a systematic retreat of the Jacobite forces due to approaching forces from Edinburgh. Lord George Murray was therefore in charge. At some point, the church which was being used as a gunpowder store, blew up. It is unclear if this was a complete accident or a deliberate act gone wrong (as many people were injured). The congregation met in the West Church of Stirling until a new church was built in 1750.

In 1751 he succeeded Rev Robert Patoun as Moderator of the General Assembly of the Church of Scotland the highest position in the Scottish church.

He died in Stirling on 13 June 1765 aged 79.

== Family ==
In November 1726 he married Catherine Laing (died 1770). Their children included:

- Rev Alexander Mackie of Arbroath
- Amelia
- Catherine, married Rev Andrew Gray of Abernethy
- Jean, married Rev Patrick Meik of Kinnoull

== Publications ==
- A True and Impartial Account of the Blowing Up of St Ninian's Church in 1746
- Answer to Mr Hamilton's Testimony
