= Thomas Halyburton =

17th/18th-century Scottish divine

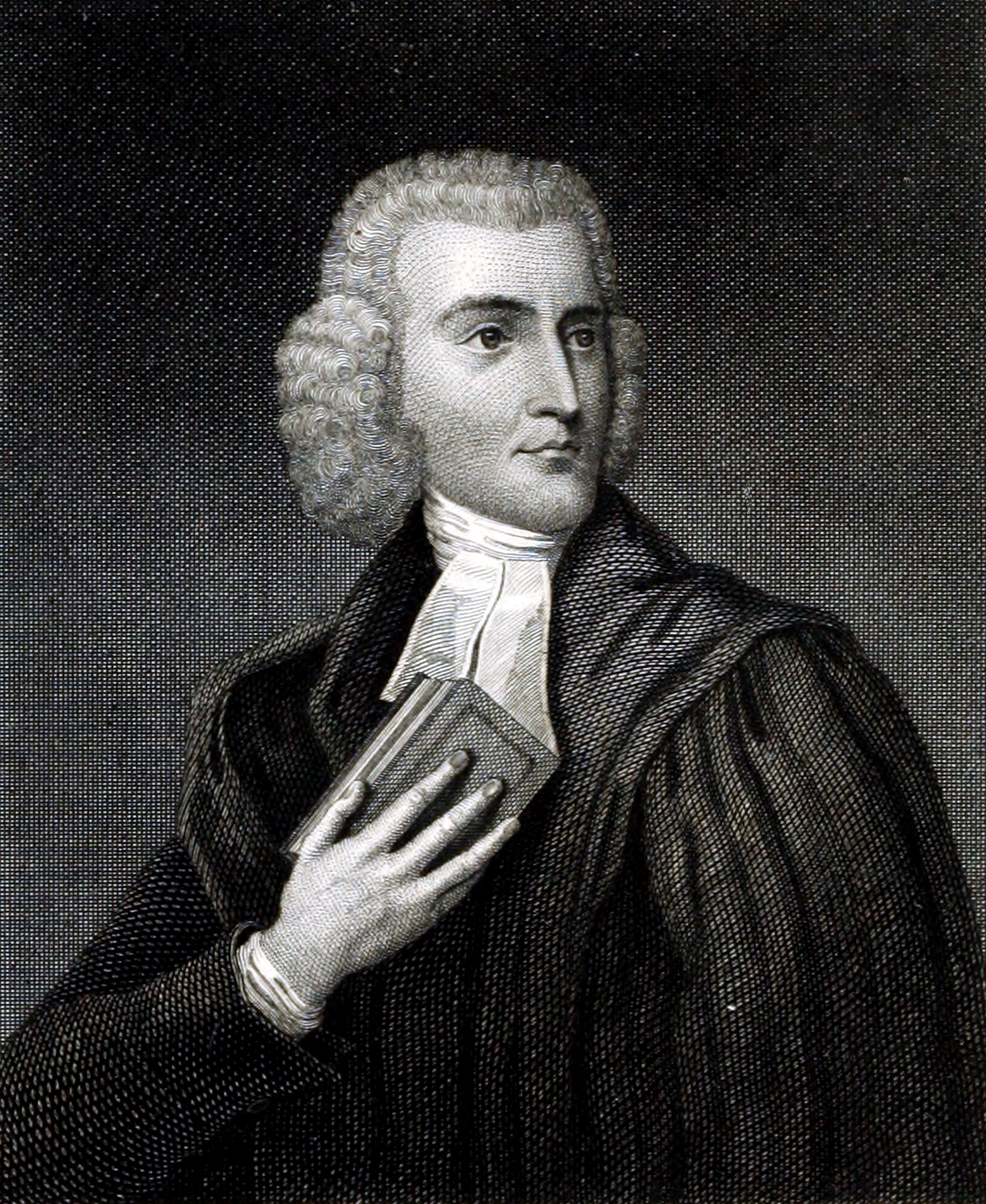
- Engraving of Halyburton by John Scott

Personal details
- Born: 25 December 1674 Perth, Scotland
- Died: 23 September 1712 (aged 37) St Andrews, Scotland

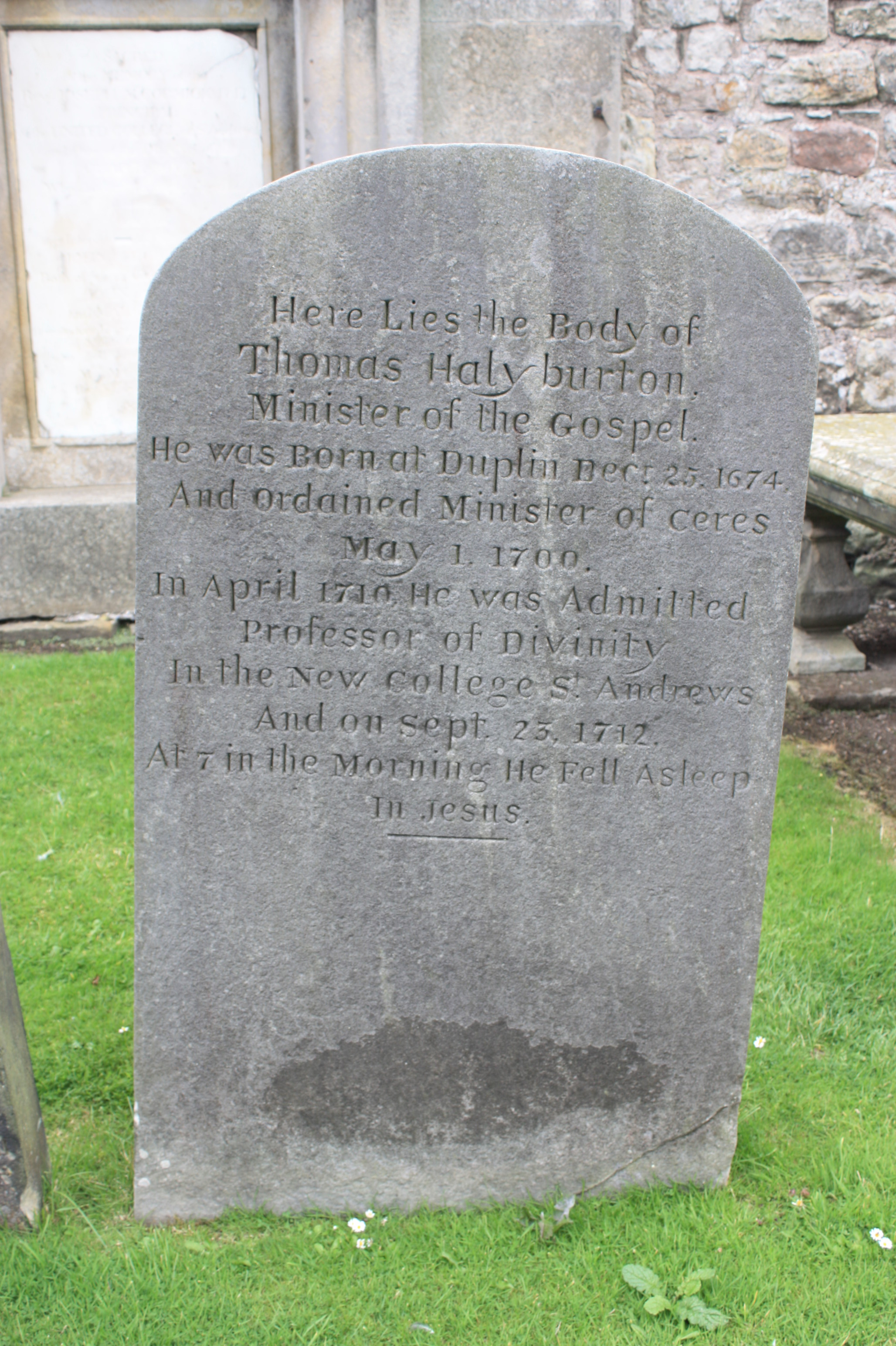
The grave of Thomas Halyburton St Andrews Cathedral churchyard

Rev Prof Thomas Halyburton (25 December 1674 – 23 September 1712) was a Scottish divine. Thomas was educated there at Erasmus's school, in Rotterdam, where his mother had taken him to avoid persecution. He returned to Scotland in 1682, graduated at the university of St. Andrews on 24 July 1696 and, after serving as a private chaplain, was licensed by the presbytery of Kirkaldy on 22 June 1699. He was ordained to the parish of Ceres, Fifeshire, 1 May 1700, but he injured his health by excessive labour. On 1 April 1710 he was appointed by Queen Anne, at the instance of the synod of Fife, professor of divinity at St. Mary's. He devoted his inaugural lecture to an attempt to confute the deistical views lately promulgated by Dr. Archibald Pitcairn in 1688. He died at St. Andrews on 23 September 1712, aged only 38.

== Life ==
Thomas Halyburton was born at Duplin, near Perth on Christmas Day 1674. His father, Rev. George Halyburton, had been a minister in the Church of Scotland but was ejected for adherence to the principles of the Covenanters. In 1676 the Privy Council of Scotland denounced the former minister for holding conventicles (church services in the open air, unauthorised by the established church and outlawed by the government). George died that same year, and in 1685 his wife moved the family to Rotterdam to avoid the fierce persecution which was carried out against the Covenanters.

In Rotterdam young Thomas was educated in the school founded by Erasmus. Following the Glorious Revolution, he returned to Scotland and continued his education in Edinburgh.

After a period of inner struggle with the philosophy of deism, Halyburton returned to the faith of his father. On completing theological training, Halyburton graduated from the University of St Andrews with an MA on 24 July 1696. He was licensed to preach in the Church of Scotland by Queen Anne, and ordained to the ministry of the church in Ceres, Fife in 1700. The church was part of the presbytery of Kirkcaldy.

After serving the church in Ceres for ten years, Halyburton was recommended by the synod of Fife for the position of Professor of Divinity at St Mary's College, St Andrews.

He died two years later at the age of 37, following an illness. His body was buried in St Andrews Cathedral next to Rev. Dr. Samuel Rutherford.

== Legacy ==
Thomas Halyburton's theological and apologetic writings are marked by a distinctive thoroughness. The surviving scripts of his sermons show him to have been richly theological, deeply experimental (i.e., dealing with the experiences of the soul) and very practical—a master of the classic Puritan style of preaching.

The extant writings of Rev. Thomas Halyburton were all published after his death:

- Natural Religion Insufficient, and Revealed Religion Necessary, to Man's Happiness in his Present State (1714), an able statement of the orthodox Calvinistic criticism of the deism of Lord Herbert of Cherbury and Charles Blount
- Memoirs of the Life of Mr Thomas Halyburton (1715), three parts by his own hand, the fourth from his diary by another hand
- The Great Concern of Salvation (1721), with a word of commendation by Isaac Watts
- Ten Sermons Preached Before and After the Lord's Supper (1722)
- The Unpardonable Sin Against the Holy Ghost (1784)

John Wesley and George Whitefield were both influenced by Halyburton's writings.

== Family ==
He was married in 1701, to Janet Watson, and had issue —

- Margaret married William Wishart
- Elizabeth
- David
- George
- Janet
- Euphemia
