= John Fulleylove =

English painter (1845–1908)

John Fulleylove (18 Aug 1845 – 22 May 1908) was an English landscape artist and illustrator.

== Life ==
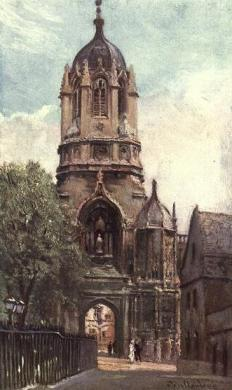
Tom Tower, Christchurch college, Oxford (1903)

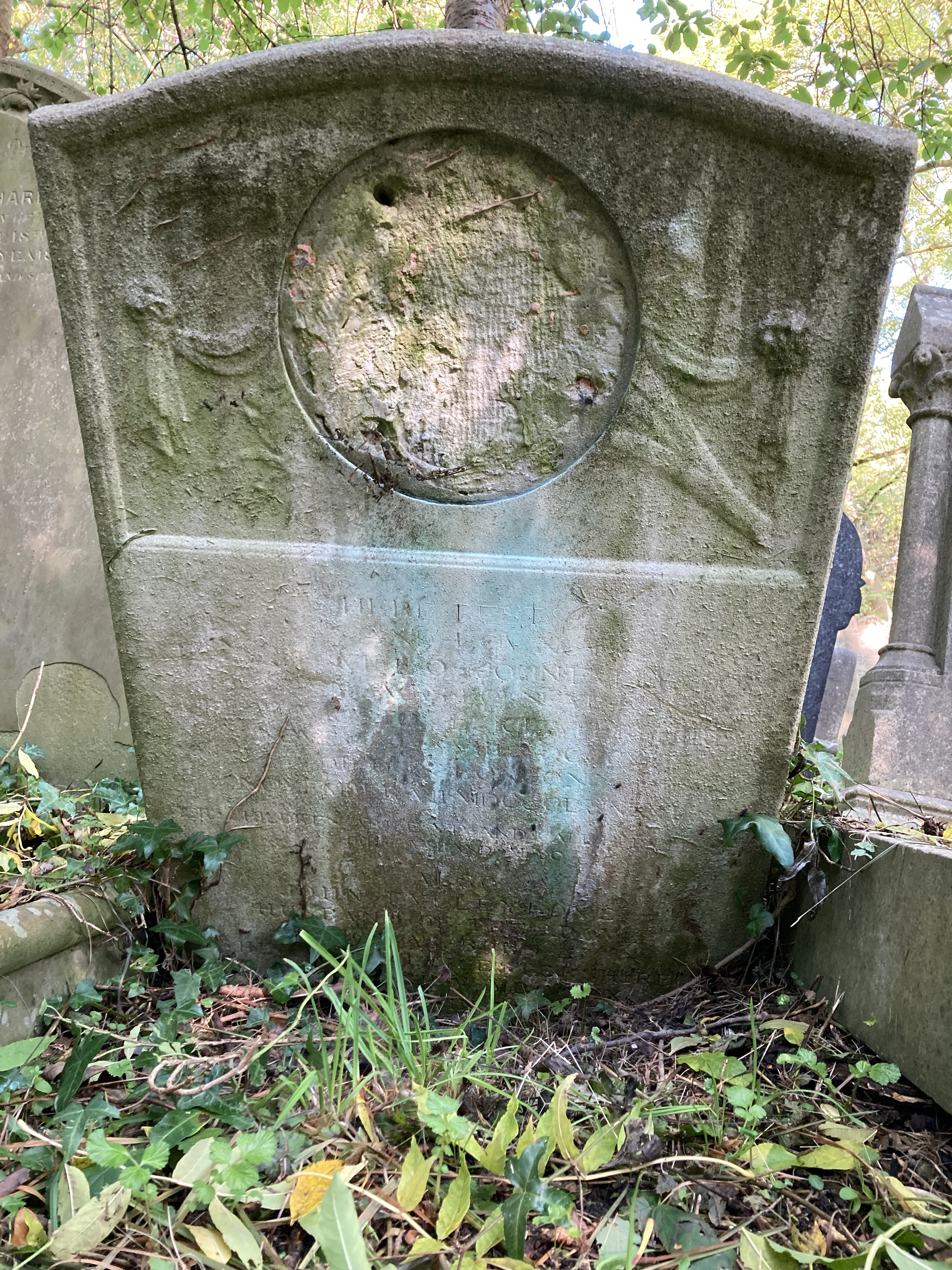
Grave of John Fulleylove in Highgate Cemetery

Born in Leicester, he originally trained as an architect with local firm "Shenton and Baker", before becoming an artist in watercolours and oils. He exhibited widely in England from 1871 at venues in London such as the Royal Academy, Royal Society of British Artists, Fine Art Society, Royal Institute of Painters in Water Colours, Royal Institute of Oil Painters, and in many other regional towns and cities. He became a member of the RI in 1879 and the ROI in 1883.

Abroad, he painted in France, Italy, Greece and the Middle East. His watercolour illustrations appeared in several travel books, such as those by A & C Black (see below).

Fulleylove died on 22 May 1908 at his Hampstead home and was buried on the eastern side of Highgate Cemetery.

== Family ==
In 1878, Fulleylove married fellow artist Elizabeth Elgood. Their daughter Joan Fulleylove (1886–1947) became a noted stained glass designer, producing windows for the Anglican cathedral in Khartoum. They also had a son, John Christopher Fulleylove, who married Margery Dudeney, daughter of puzzle designer Henry Dudeney.

== Illustrated books ==
- Various. The picturesque Mediterranean, its cities, shores, and islands (Cassell, 1890).
- Martin, B. E. & North, E. D. In the footprints of Charles Lamb (New York, Scribners, 1890).
- Kelman, John. The Holy Land (A & C Black, 1902).
- Thomas, Edward. Oxford (A & C Black, 1903).
- Murray Smith, A. Westminster Abbey (A & C Black, 1906).
- M'Clymont, J. A. Greece (A & C Black, 1906).
- Moncrieff, A. R. Hope. Middlesex (A & C Black, 1907).
- Masson, Rosaline Orme. Edinburgh (A & C Black, 1907).
- Poyser, Arthur. The Tower of London (A & C Black, 1908).
