= Thomas Martin (moderator) =

Scottish minister

Thomas Martin (14 April 1856 – 7 January 1942) was a Scottish minister who served as Moderator of the General Assembly of the Church of Scotland in 1920.

== Life ==
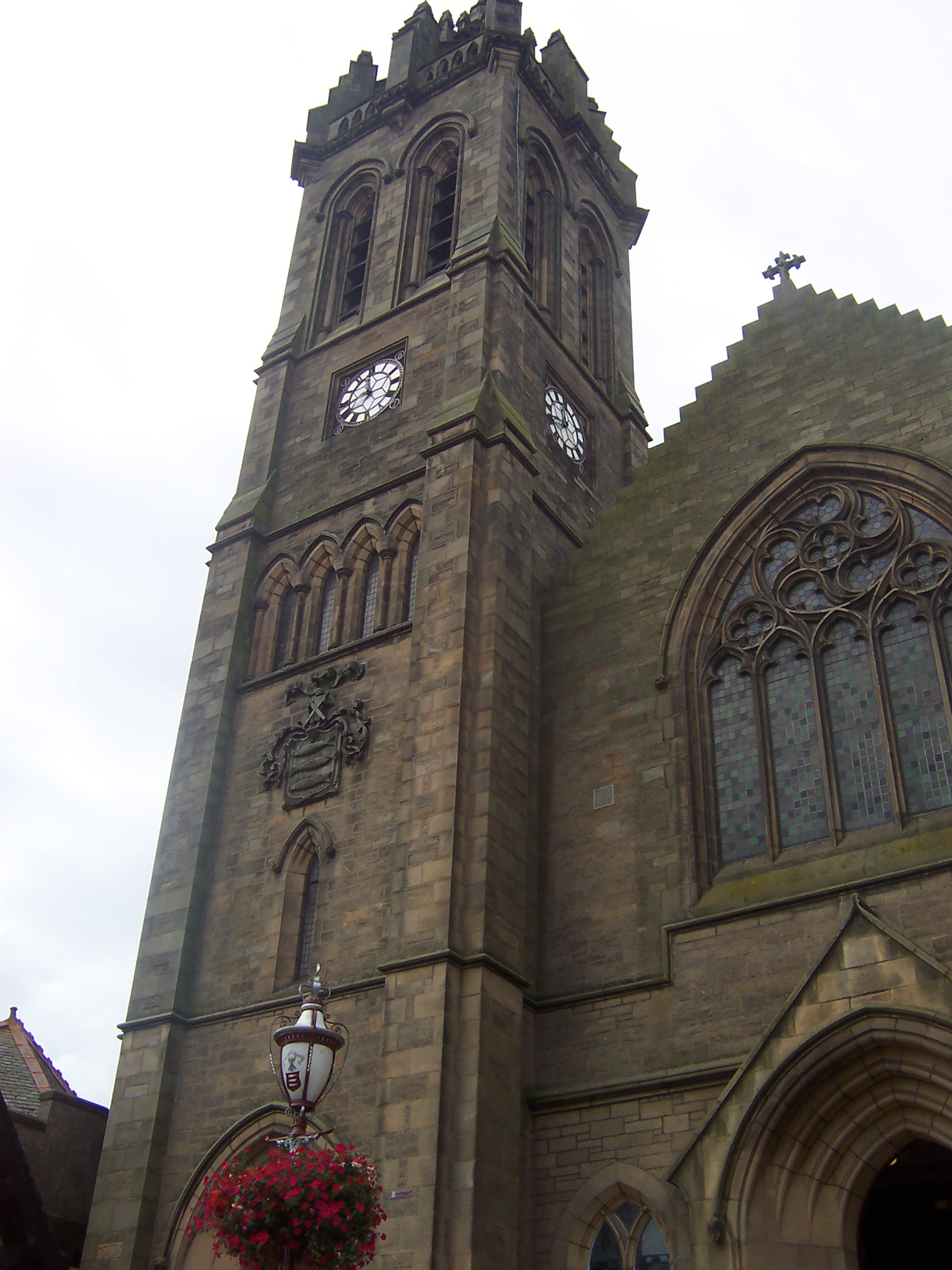
Old Parish Church of Peebles

Martin was born on 14 April 1856 at Scone, Perthshire. His father, Hugh, was farmer. He attended St Martin's Parish School and studied at the universities of Edinburgh (MA, 1880) and St Andrews.

Martin was successively minister of Cramond Kirk, St Mary's Cathedral, Edinburgh, The Barony Church in Glasgow and from 1911 Peebles Old Parish Church.

In 1920 he succeeded William Paterson Paterson as Moderator of the General Assembly of the Church of Scotland. He was succeeded in turn in 1921 by James McClymont.

He married Christian I. Robertson in London. Their children were Hugh Forgan Martin of Dollar Academy, Thomas Martin who was a physician, and Christian Isabella who married the theologian George Thomas Thomson.

He died on 7 January 1942.
