= John Smith (moderator) =

Scottish minister

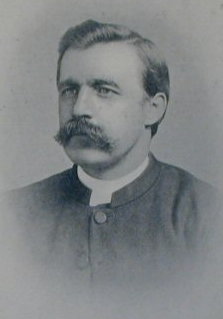
Very Rev John Smith (1854–1927) in 1909

John Smith (1854–1927) was a Scottish minister who served as Moderator of the General Assembly of the Church of Scotland in 1922 and was also heavily involved in Scottish education including Chairman of Govan School Board.

== Life ==
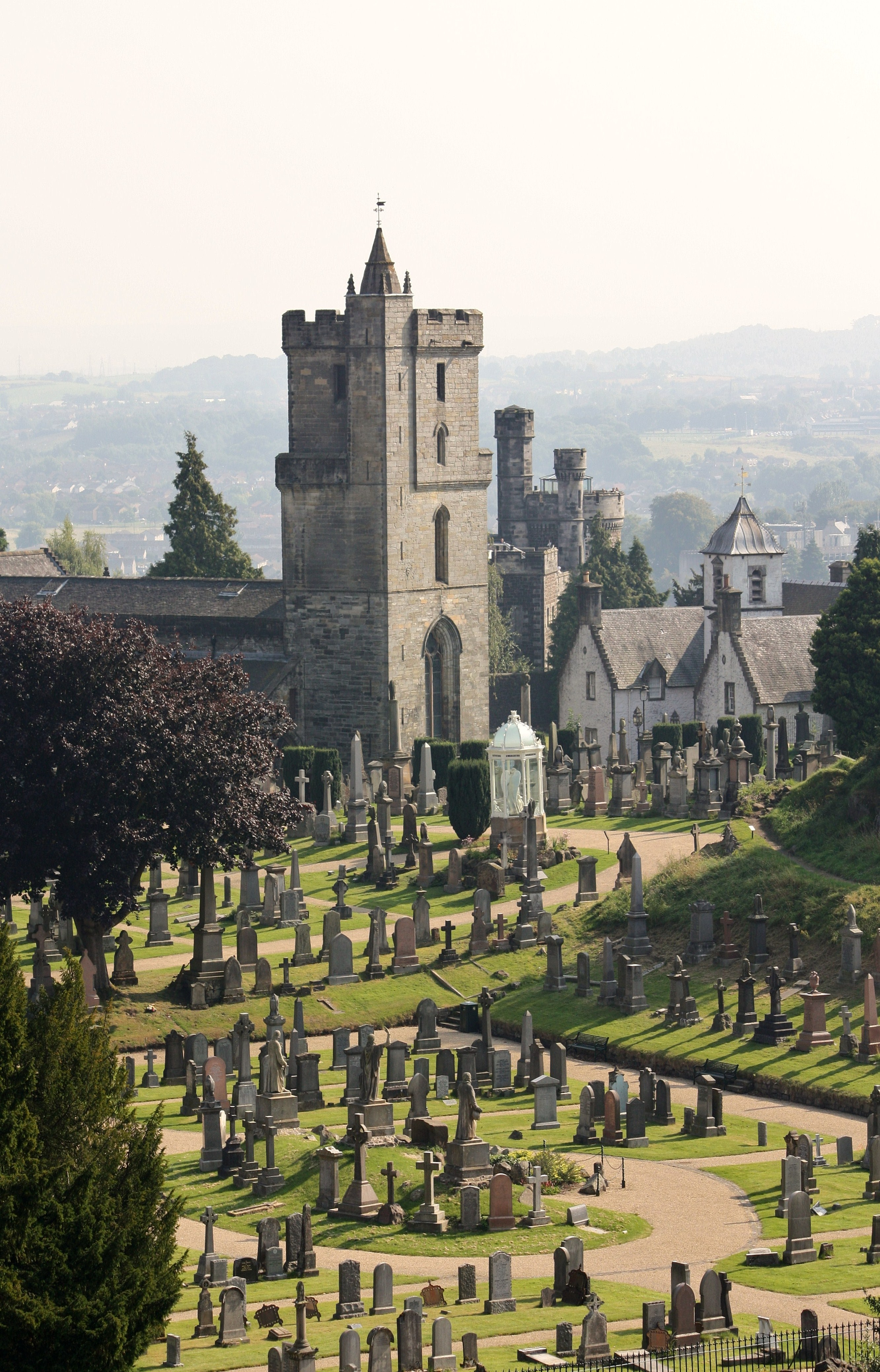
Church of the Holy Rude, Stirling

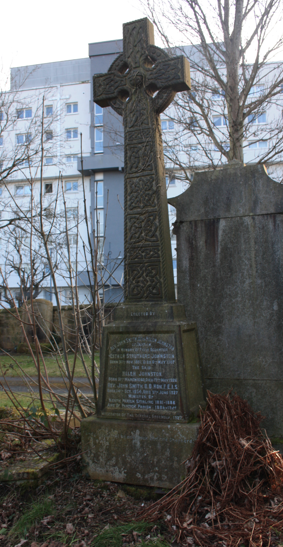
The grave of Very Rev John Smith, Craigton Cemetery, Glasgow

John Smith was born on 14 October 1854, the son of Robert Smith, an iron merchant at Tollcross in Glasgow. He was not born in Glasgow but moved there at an early age, being educated at St John's Academy, Glasgow then Glasgow High School. Around 1868 he began an apprenticeship as a "measurer". However, he decided he wished to join the church and therefore went to study at Glasgow University around 1872, graduating MA (1877) BD (1880). He was licensed to preach in 1880.

Smith was ordained as a minister of the Church of Scotland of North Parish in Stirling in June 1881. As with many of the larger Scottish cities, this was one of three parishes contained in one building: the Church of the Holy Rude. He translated to Partick Parish Church in June 1886 replacing Rev John Calder. In 1903 Glasgow University awarded him an honorary Doctor of Divinity.

In 1922 he succeeded James A. McClymont as Moderator of the General Assembly of the Church of Scotland the highest position in the Scottish Church. He was succeeded in turn by George Milligan.

Smith joined Stirling School Board in 1882 and continued a strong interest in education. He was Convenor of the General Assembly's Education Committee and oversaw the Sabbath School Committee. He was also Chairman of Govan's Education Committee for 15 years. He was a member of Glasgow University Court, Chairman of the Scottish Education Committee, President of the Scottish School Boards. He was made an honorary Fellow of the Educational Institute of Scotland.

He died in Partick on 9 June 1927 and is buried in Craigton Cemetery.

== Family ==
In August 1882 he married author Helen Johnston (1860–1926), daughter of Gilbert Johnston of Shettleston. They had several children:

- Jane Briggs Burns Smith (born 1883) married William Stevenson Brownlee of Clydebank
- Helen Johnston Smith (born 1885) married Brodie Smith Gilfillan of Inch
- Lt Robert Stanley Smith (born 1887) of the Argyll and Sutherland Highlanders
- Cpt. John Sydney Smith (born 1889) of the Highland Light Infantry
- Esther Struthers Johnston Smith (1891–1907)
- Gilbert Johnston Smith (1897–1947) Lt in the Royal Flying Corps and Royal Air Force captured in 1918 but survived. Qualified as a physician and later served as Governor of Insein Prison in Burma

== Publications ==
- Short Studies in the Gospel (1901)
- Andrew Melville (1910)
- Broken Links in Scottish Education (1912)
- Rise and Growth of Continuation Classes (1912)
- The Hebrew Psalmist and the Scottish Bard (1918)
- Education and the Church (1922)

He was a joint author of the "Sunday School Teachers Handbook".
