= James Boyd of Trochrig =

Scottish clergyman

James Boyd of Trochrig (c. 1530–1581) was a Scottish clergyman in post-Reformation Scotland who served as Protestant Archbishop of Glasgow from 1573 to 1581. He was Moderator of the General Assembly in 1575. He was co-author of the Reformation document the Second Book of Discipline.

== Life ==
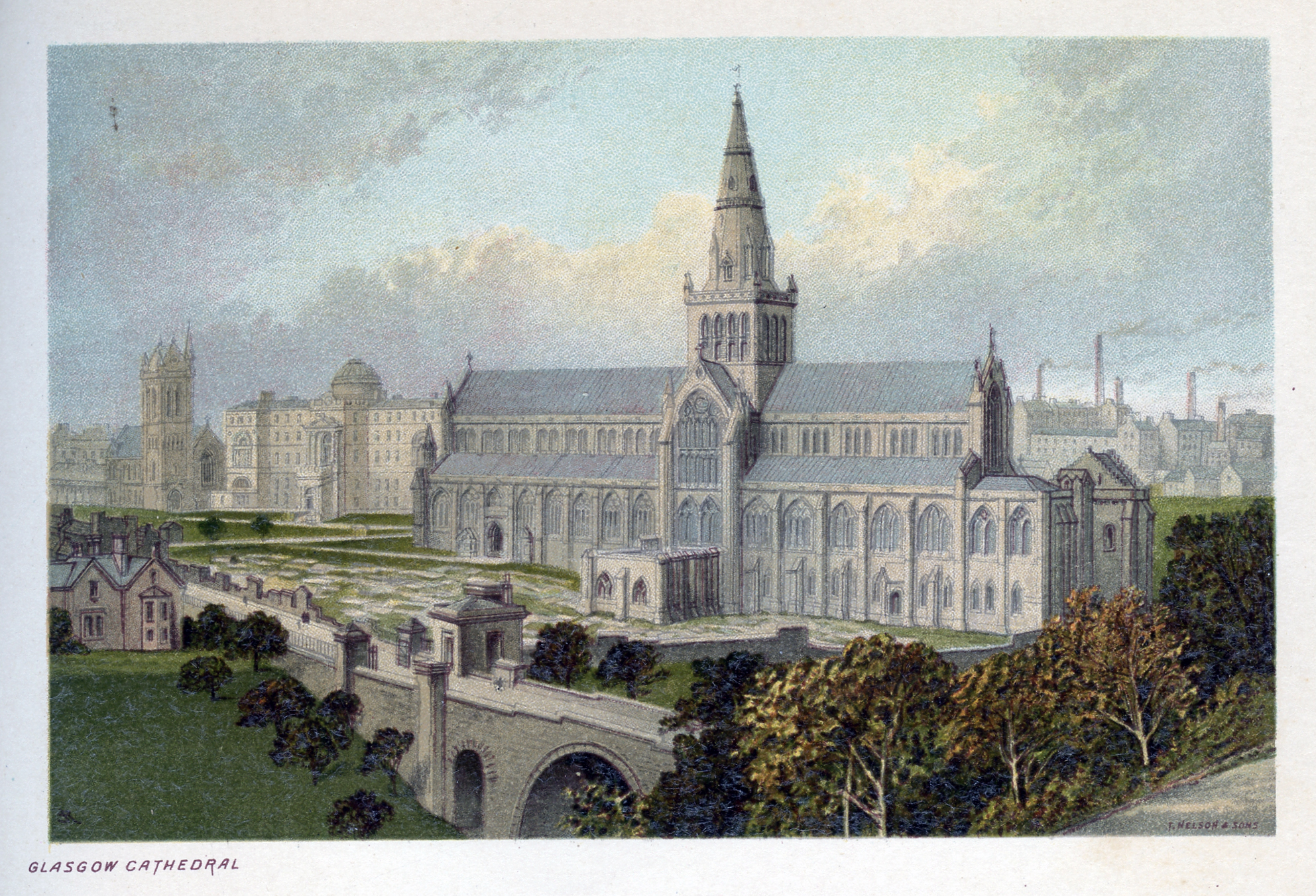
Glasgow Cathedral

He was the second son of Adam Boyd of Pinkhill and his wife Helen Kennedy. His paternal uncle was Robert Boyd, 4th Lord Boyd.

He was present at the Battle of Langside in 1568 on the side of Mary, Queen of Scots. He studied philosophy at Glasgow University then went to France to do further studies in law under Cujacius. He returned to Scotland and around 1572 became minister of Kirkoswald in Ayrshire. He lived nearby at Trochrig House (aka Trochrague) on the coast south of Ayr. In 1573 he was promoted to Archbishop of Glasgow based at Glasgow Cathedral also being given charge of the nearby Barony Church.

He was Chancellor of Glasgow University from 1573 until death, operating alongside Andrew Hay as Rector, and Andrew Melville as Principal.

In 1574 he helped to create the Second Book of Discipline. In March 1575 he replaced John Duncanson as Moderator of the General Assembly of the Church of Scotland. From 1577 he seems to have returned to Kirkoswald but was still styled "Bishop".

He died on 15 March 1581. He is buried in the choir of Glasgow Cathedral with Bishop Gavin Dunbar. His formal position as archbishop was filled by Robert Montgomery.

== Family ==
He married Margaret Chalmer daughter of James Chalmer of Gadgirth. Their son Robert Boyd was Principal of Glasgow University.
