= Robert Arnot =

Scottish Presbyterian minister and professor of divinity

Robert Arnot (1744–1808) was a Scottish Presbyterian minister and professor of divinity in St Andrews University, who was Moderator of the General Assembly of the Church of Scotland in 1794.

== Early life ==
Arnot studied (most likely at St Andrews) and was licensed by Cupar Presbytery on 5 Sept 1769. He was ordained as a minister at the parish of Ceres, Fife on 30 August 1770, where he oversaw (and perhaps even prepared) that parish's report for the Statistical Account of Scotland. He was elected clerk to the presbytery in December 1777. He resigned this post on 16 October 1792 to take up his post as professor of divinity at New College, (nowadays, more commonly called St Mary's College, St Andrews). This had been achieved as a result of much lobbying, and the support of Dundas, and possibly as compensation for a failure to get the chair of ecclesiastical history.

Arnot seems not to have published anything and was described by one historian as "no scholar". He owed his career to the influence of Robert Dundas, who managed Scotland on behalf of his father Henry Dundas. The principal of St Andrews, George Hill, described him in 1791. "There is not a more staunch friend to the true principles of moderation, or a man more firmly attached to the Constitution, in the whole Church than Dr Arnot." He was therefore a loyal member of the so-called Moderates in the Church of Scotland. Thomas Chalmers in a letter from Anstruther 1800 says:

"Dr Arnot resides in Kingsbarns, and will, I believe, win over the people by the popularity of his manners". This related to the legal challenge of some of his congregation to his appointment as minister there in 1800, in conjunction with his appointment to the divinity professorship.

== Moderator ==
In a similar fashion, in 1794 he was "elected" Moderator of the General Assembly of the Church of Scotland. The king's letter to the assembly, written by Henry Dundas reflected the troubled times and urged "we cannot press too earnestly upon your minds the necessity of redoubling your common efforts to check that prevalent spirit of licentious innovation, by which the present times are so unhappily distinguished, and which threaten to fill the whole Christian world with violence and confusion". The assembly responded by indicating that the war against France had its full support, as did measures against disaffected people in Britain. However, they did add "it affords us the greatest satisfaction to be able to assure your Majesty, that the sound principles of loyalty, and of attachment to the constitution in Church and State, are fixed in the hearts of the great body of your Majesty's subjects in Scotland". The assembly published strict orders to all ministers to ensure the regular reading of the Bible in the Parish schools, along with the Shorter Catechism. They also required every minister to inspect the schools to ensure these activities took place regularly. In addition, the assembly thanked the king for his efforts to spread the Protestant religion in the Highlands and Islands.

== Disputed appointments ==
In 1799, he was presented by the heritor to the parish of Kingsbarns, and took up the post in 1800, after seeing off a challenge that he could not be both a professor and a parish minister. This challenge went as far as the General Assembly, where a very heated debate took place. Some of the speeches against Dr Arnot were later printed—especially that of William Laurence Brown, principal of Marischal College—and helped foment a growing opposition to the Moderates, which eventually led to the Great Disruption of the Church of Scotland, when the many ministers left on the principle of opposition to Patronage and formed the Free Church of Scotland.
In 1799 he lobbied hard, proclaiming his loyalty as good Dundas man, for principalship of the United College in St Andrews, along with a living at St Leonards. He had strong support among the faculty, but so did his rival, and neither would give way so Dundas went outside the university for someone "independent".
Arnot was not averse to challenging appointments himself. In 1804, the professor of medicine, James Flint, tried to secure the succession of his son John to his post, by getting him appointed joint professor. Arnot refused to attend the inauguration and took the matter to court. the Court of Session turned down his challenge, but this was overturned five years later by the House of Lords.

== Death ==
On 24 May 1772 he married Helen Barclay, who outlived him and died 4 April 1816. The Reverend Doctor Robert Arnot died on 2 July 1808.

== See also ==
- List of moderators of the General Assembly of the Church of Scotland

== Footnotes ==
Church of Scotland titles
Preceded by Thomas Hardy	Moderator of the General Assembly of the Church of Scotland; 1794	Succeeded by James Meek
