= William Mitchell (moderator) =

Scottish minister

William Mitchell (1670–1727) was a 17th/18th century Scottish minister who served as Moderator of the General Assembly of the Church of Scotland five times. He was Chaplain in Ordinary to the King (George I).

== Life ==
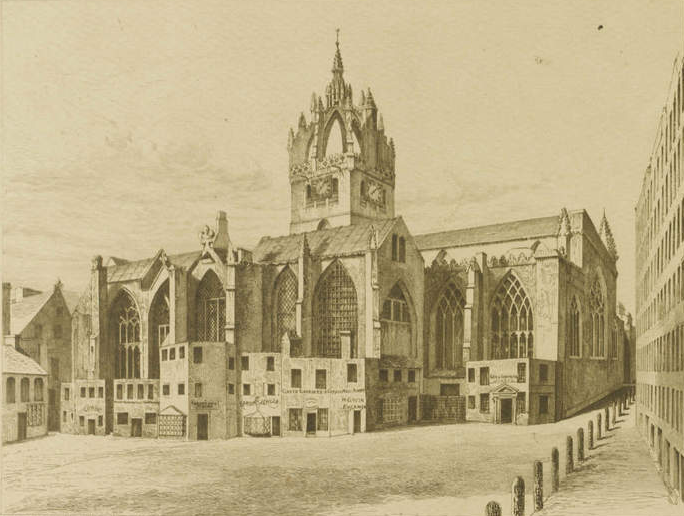
St Giles in the 18th century

He was born in Aberdeen in 1670 the son of Rev William Mitchell, minister of Footdee parish in Aberdeen, and his wife Margaret Cant. He was licensed to preach as a minister of the Church of Scotland by the Presbytery of Aberdeen around 1690. In 1695 he was ordained as "second charge" of Canongate Kirk in Edinburgh.

In 1708 he was translated to the "second charge" of the Old Kirk of St Giles (then split into four parishes) in place of William Carstares. He was elected Moderator of the General Assembly in 1710, 1714, 1717, 1722 and 1726.

In 1721 he translated from Old Kirk, St Giles to High Kirk, St Giles - both within the same building. He had great influence in the Scottish Parliament adjacent to St Giles.

In 1727 he was one of the Scottish elite sent to congratulate King George II on his ascension to the throne, but Mitchell died in York on 8 September 1727 before reaching his destination. His position at St Giles was filled by Robert Kinloch.

== Family ==
In 1705 he married Margaret Cunningham, daughter of Hugh Cunningham and widow of James Stewart. Their children included:

- Hugh (died young)
- An infant daughter (died young)
- Sir Andrew Mitchell MP (b. 1708) for Aberdeen 1747 to 1754 and for Elgin Burghs 1755 to 1771

In July 1723 he married Barbara Forbes, daughter of John Forbes and widow of Thomas Mitchell of Thainston, a baillie in Aberdeen.

== Publications ==
- The Diary of William Mitchell
