= James Alston =

Scotland minister

James Alston (1679–1733) was a Church of Scotland minister who served twice as Moderator of the General Assembly in both 1725 and 1729. He was Chaplain in Ordinary to the King.

== Life ==
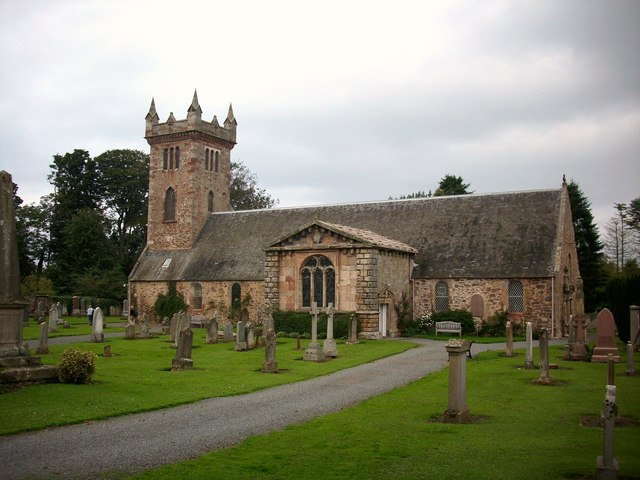
Dirleton Kirk

He was born in Edinburgh, the eldest son of James Alston, a merchant. He studied at the University of Edinburgh and graduated with an MA in July 1697. He was licensed to preach by the Presbytery of Edinburgh five years later, in 1702.

His began his ecclesiastical career as morning lecturer in the Tron Kirk on the Royal Mile in May 1703 but in September 1703 was ordained as minister of Dirleton church, east of Edinburgh, and remained in this role for the rest of his life.

In both 1725 and 1729 he succeeded Rev William Wishart as Moderator of the General Assembly of the Church of Scotland the highest position in the Scottish church.

In 1726 he was made Chaplain in Ordinary to King George I and on the King's death Alston continued as Chaplain to King George II. In 1727 he was proposed as the likely successor to William Wishart as Principal of the University of Edinburgh but the role went instead to William Hamilton. He was offered a post as Professor of Divinity under Hamilton but declined.

He died on 19 April 1733. He was buried in the still extant graveyard at St Giles Cathedral despite that graveyard being little used since the creation of Greyfriars Kirkyard 150 years earlier. This was probably to be with his family. The graveyard was little used after 1630 when St Giles manse was demolished to create Parliament House. The last vestiges of the graveyard were removed around 1760. Alston is one of the last known burials prior to clearance.

== Family ==
In June 1705 he married Janet Reid (d.1769) daughter of Rev Matthew Reid of Hoddom in Dumfriesshire. Their children included:

- James Alston of Redsyde (1707–1761) buried in North Berwick
- William Alston WS (d.1775) living at Abbeyhill in Edinburgh
- Margaret, married James Hamilton, an army surgeon, in 1735
