= Andrew Bell (moderator) =

Minister of the Church of Scotland

Andrew Bell (c. 1795–1861) was a minister of the Church of Scotland, who served as Moderator of the General Assembly in 1855.

== Life ==
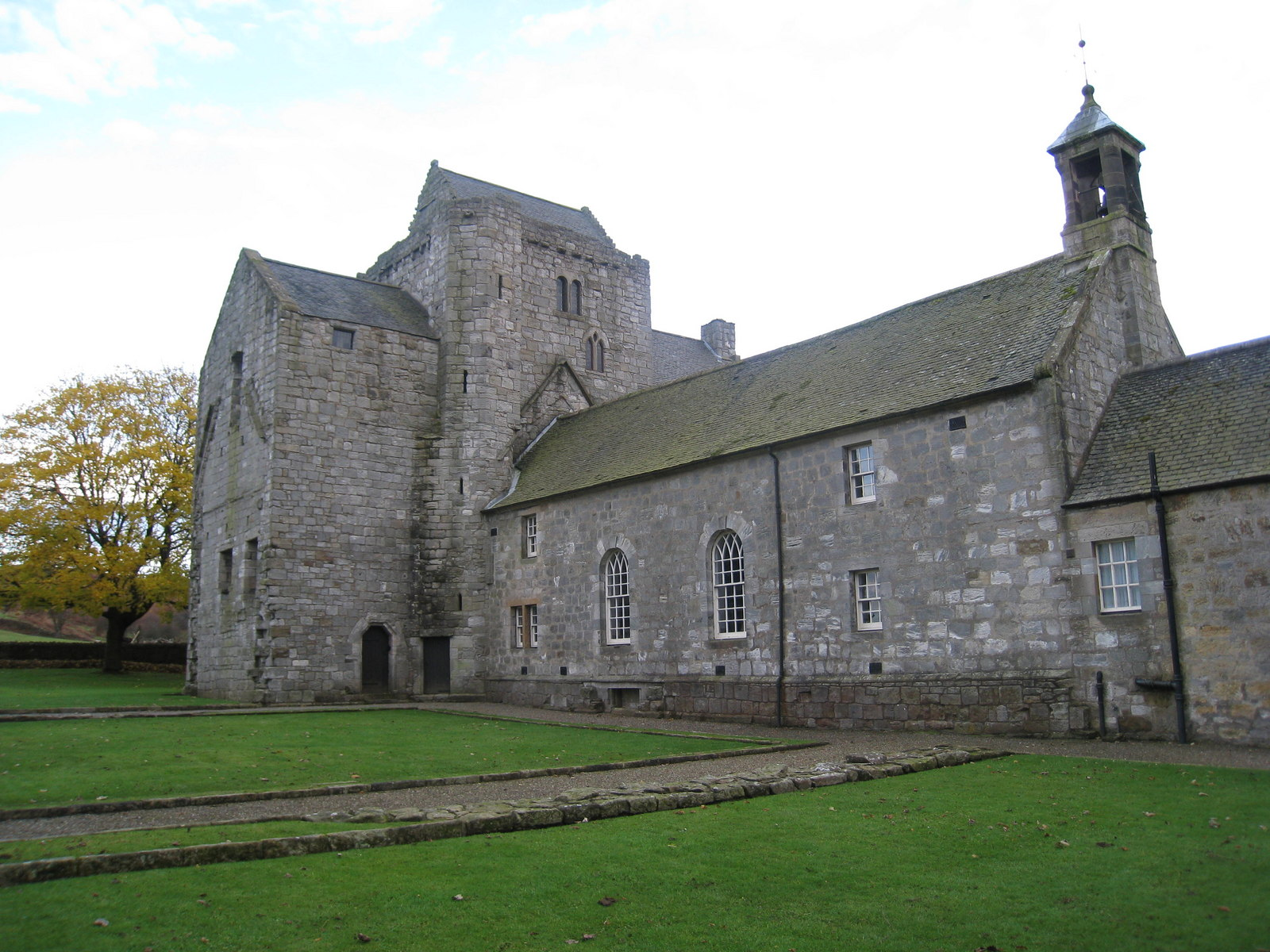
Torphichen Parish Church

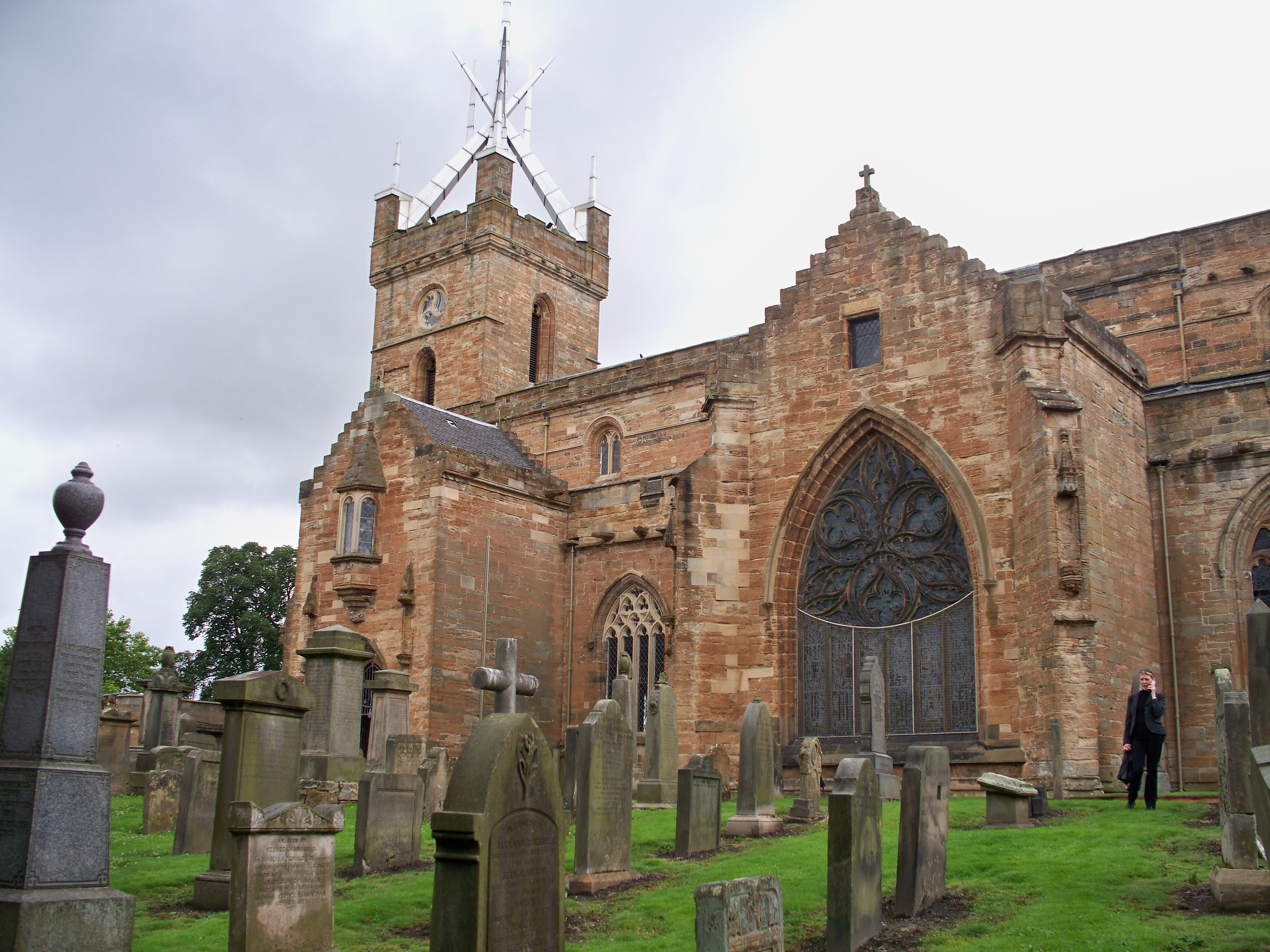
St Michael's Parish Church in Linlithgow

He was born the son of John Bell, a farmer on Hill of Tarvit in central Fife. He studied at the nearby University of St Andrews and was licensed to preach by the Presbytery of Linlithgow on 31 December 1817. In March 1822 he was ordained at the church of Torphichen in West Lothian. In June 1827 he was presented by King George IV to the congregation of Linlithgow Parish Church and was formally translated there in June 1827 in place of James Dobie. In July 1842 St Andrews University awarded him an honorary Doctor of Divinity.

In 1855 he succeeded James Grant as Moderator of the General Assembly of the Church of Scotland, the highest position in the Scottish Church. He was succeeded in turn by John Crombie of Scone.

He died in Linlithgow on 7 February 1862.

== Family ==
In August 1861, he married Clementina Napier, widow of Henry Glassford of Dougalston.

== Artistic recognition ==
He was portrayed by John Adam Houston and this was made into a mezzotint by T. G. Flowers. This is held at the Scottish National Portrait Gallery.

== Publications ==
- Statistical Account of Linlithgow (1845)
