= Robert Kinloch =

Scottish minister

Robert Kinloch (c.1688–1756) was a Scottish minister who served as Moderator of the General Assembly of the Church of Scotland in 1747.

== Life ==
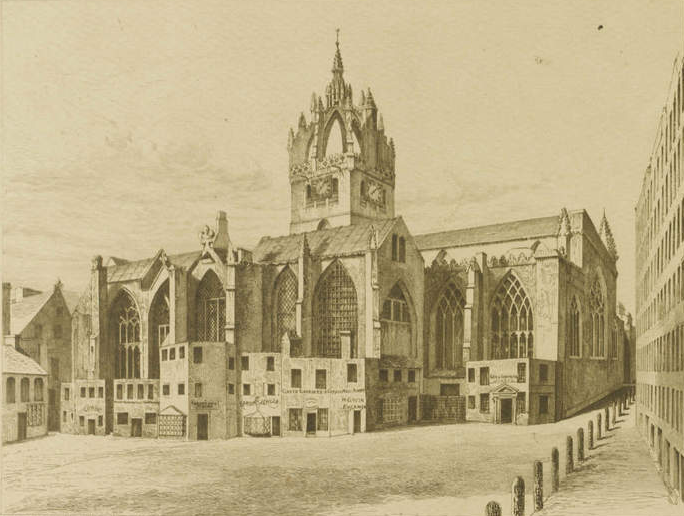
St Giles in the 18th century

He gained an MA in St Leonard's College (University of St Andrews) in 1706. He was licensed to preach as a minister of the Church of Scotland in 1711 by the Presbytery of Dundee and Forfar.

He was called as "third charge" to the large Dundee congregation in August 1713. After 15 years in Dundee he translated to "second charge" of the High Kirk of St Giles in Edinburgh in 1728 replacing the ill-fated William Mitchell, both under the first charge of John Mathieson.

In 1747 he succeeded Rev John Lumsden as Moderator of the General Assembly. He was succeeded in turn in 1748 by Rev George Wishart.

He resigned on 24 February 1756 due to ill-health and died a few weeks later on 3 April 1756.

== Family ==
He married Lilias Campbell third daughter of Colin Campbell of Monzie. Their children included John Kinloch WS.

== Publications ==
- The Truth and Excellency of the Gospel Revelation (1731)
