= John Crombie (minister) =

Church of Scotland minister (1789–1872)

John Crombie (1789–1872) was a minister of the Church of Scotland, who served as Moderator of the General Assembly in 1856.

== Life ==
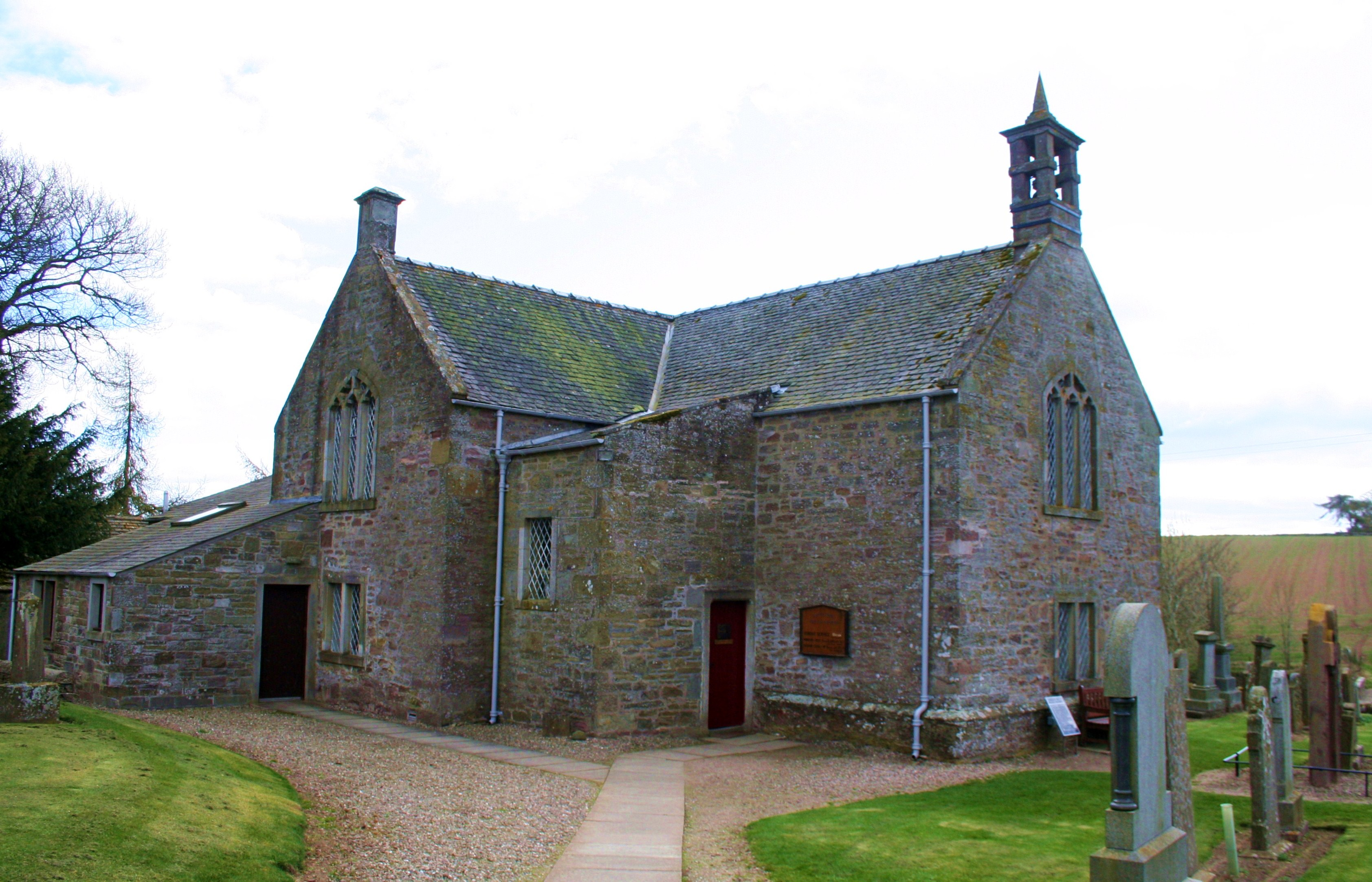
Aberlemno Kirk

He was born in 1789 the son of Francis Crombie, a schoolteacher, and his wife, Jean Fair. He studied at St Andrews University, graduating MA in 1822.

He was ordained at St Andrew's Scots Church in London in January 1819. Whilst in London St Andrews University awarded him an honorary Doctor of Divinity in 1832. Crombie translated to Aberlemno in September 1841. Staying in the established church in the Disruption of 1843 he translated to Scone (near Perth) in March 1844.

In 1856 he succeeded Andrew Bell of Linlithgow as Moderator of the General Assembly of the Church of Scotland, the highest position in the Scottish Church. He was succeeded in turn by James Robertson.

He died on 4 December 1872.

== Family ==
In October 1827 he married Frances Liddle (d.1850) of St Dunstan's in Stepney. They had several children:

- Frances (b.1833)
- Jean (b.1835)
- Isabella Christie Crombie (b.1840) married Rev John Martin of Bonhill, died in Welshpool in Australia
- John Liddle Crombie (1842–1920) doctor in North Berwick
- Louisa Crombie (1844–1920) died in Perth

== Publications ==
- Statistical Account of Aberlemno (1845)
- The Character and Offices of Christ
