= Gilbert Garden =

Gilbert Garden (also known as Gardin or Gardyn) was a 16th-century Church of Scotland minister immediately after the Reformation, who served as Moderator of the General Assembly in August 1571.

== Life ==
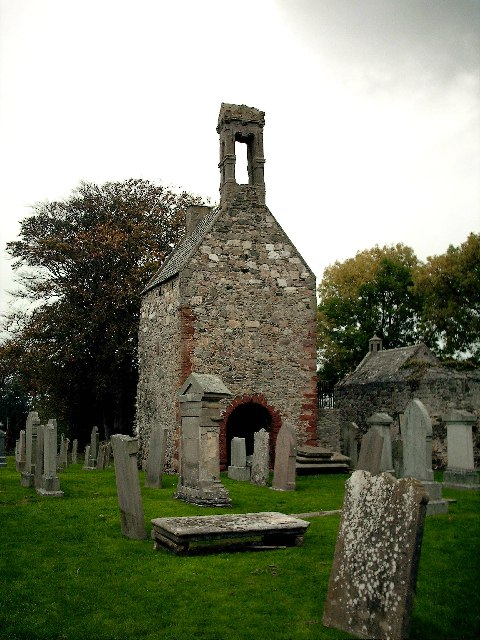
The ruins of Fordyce Church

He was born and/or raised in Boath near Carmyllie in Forfarshire.

From 1563 to 1565 he was minister of Monikie.

In 1565 he became minister of Monifieth. In July 1568 he was presented by King James VI to the congregation of Fordyce, the principal Presbytery of the area, and translated as minister of the parish church in February 1569.

In August 1571 he succeeded George Hay as Moderator of the General Assembly of the Church of Scotland the highest position in the Scottish church. This Assembly met in Stirling.

In 1595 he translated to Cullen for a year before returning to Fordyce. As his position at Fordyce was filled by Patrick Darg in 1599 Garden must be presumed dead in or before 1599.

== Family ==
His wife Margaret died in April 1592 aged 66 and is buried in Fordyce; in August 1592 he married Isobel Strachan of Carmyllie (west of Arbroath).
