= Andrew Milne (solicitor) =

English solicitor

Andrew Jonathan Milne (born 1963) is an English solicitor and the principal of Andrew Milne & Co Solicitors in London. Milne has been involved in disputes concerning his acquisition of residential freeholds and his dealings with leaseholders. In 2026, he was convicted of stalking legal blogger Daniel Cloake, after which the Solicitors Regulation Authority (SRA) imposed conditions on his practising certificate requiring him to practise only under the supervision of an SRA-approved solicitor while regulatory investigations continued.

== Career ==
Milne qualified as a solicitor in 1986. He is the principal of Andrew Milne & Co Solicitors. Following his stalking conviction in 2026, the Solicitors Regulation Authority imposed conditions on his practising certificate requiring him to practise only under the supervision of a solicitor approved by the regulator.

== Property acquisitions ==
Milne acquired freehold interests in hundreds of leasehold properties across the United Kingdom, often at auction. He subsequently sought to sell the freeholds to leaseholders, with recipients and judges describing some of his correspondence as aggressive, threatening or intimidatory.

In proceedings before the county court in North Wales, the court ordered Milne to sell a block of flats after finding that leaseholders had not been offered their statutory right of first refusal. Judge Andrew Keyser KC described Milne's communications as "disgraceful and inexcusable" and stated:

I do not consider him to be an honest or credible man. [...] For his own ends, he is willing to resort to intimidatory and threatening language, advancing allegations that he cannot possibly believe to be justified.

The judge also referred the matter to the SRA.

In Sheffield, Milne purchased nearly 300 freeholds in 2025 for an average of about £320 each before writing to leaseholders seeking payments of £25,000 or more to acquire the freeholds. Several leaseholders told the BBC that the letters caused significant distress, and some said they paid the amounts demanded.

In Bolton, leaseholders reported receiving letters demanding around £6,000 to purchase their freeholds, despite Milne having acquired some of them for substantially lower sums.

In April 2026, Milne was arrested by South Yorkshire Police on suspicion of fraud and blackmail.

== Stalking conviction ==
On 10 February 2026, Milne was convicted at Stratford Magistrates' Court of stalking without fear, contrary to the Protection from Harassment Act 1997. The offence related to his harassment of legal blogger Daniel Cloake (known online as mouseinthecourt) between March and August 2024.

The court heard that Milne sent approximately 124 communications to Cloake, including more than 120 emails, two voicemails, a birthday gift and a handwritten letter, and also attended Cloake's home. One handwritten note included the words "WHERE ARE YOU? LOL LOL LOL..." before threatening bankruptcy and making Cloake his "TOTAL SEX SLAVE". The district judge rejected Milne's defence that Cloake's conduct was motivated by romantic interest, finding Milne's behaviour to be oppressive and unreasonable.

On 10 March 2026, Milne was sentenced to 300 hours of unpaid work, 20 rehabilitation activity requirement days, ordered to pay £850 compensation and costs, and made subject to a seven-year restraining order.

Following the conviction, the SRA imposed conditions on Milne's practising certificate requiring him to act only under the supervision of an SRA-approved solicitor while regulatory investigations continued.

Milne appealed his conviction to the Crown Court, but was unsuccessful. His Honour Judge Timothy Greene said "In every respect where their accounts differed, we preferred the evidence of Mr Cloake to the evidence of Mr Milne... we are in no doubt that Mr Milne lied repeatedly in his evidence to us." The court varied the sentence imposed at the Magistrates' Court by increasing the amount of compensation Milne has to pay Cloake to £1,000. Milne was also ordered to pay an additional £1,300 in costs.
