= Andrew Hay (footballer) =

Scottish footballer

Personal information
- Full name: Andrew Hunter Hay
- Date of birth: 22 November 1909
- Place of birth: Dalry, Scotland
- Position: Right back

Senior career*
Years	Team	Apps	(Gls)
1924–1926	Airdrieonians		
1926–1927	Queen's Park	16	(0)
1930–1931	Clydebank	19	(0)

International career
1926	Scotland Amateurs	1	(0)
- * Club domestic league appearances and goals

Andrew Hunter Hay was a Scottish amateur football right back who played in the Scottish League for Clydebank and Queen's Park. He was capped by Scotland at amateur level.
