= Robert Roche (minister) =

Robert Roche (c.1580–1640) was a Church of Scotland Scottish minister who served as Moderator of the General Assembly of the Church of Scotland in 1613.

== Life ==
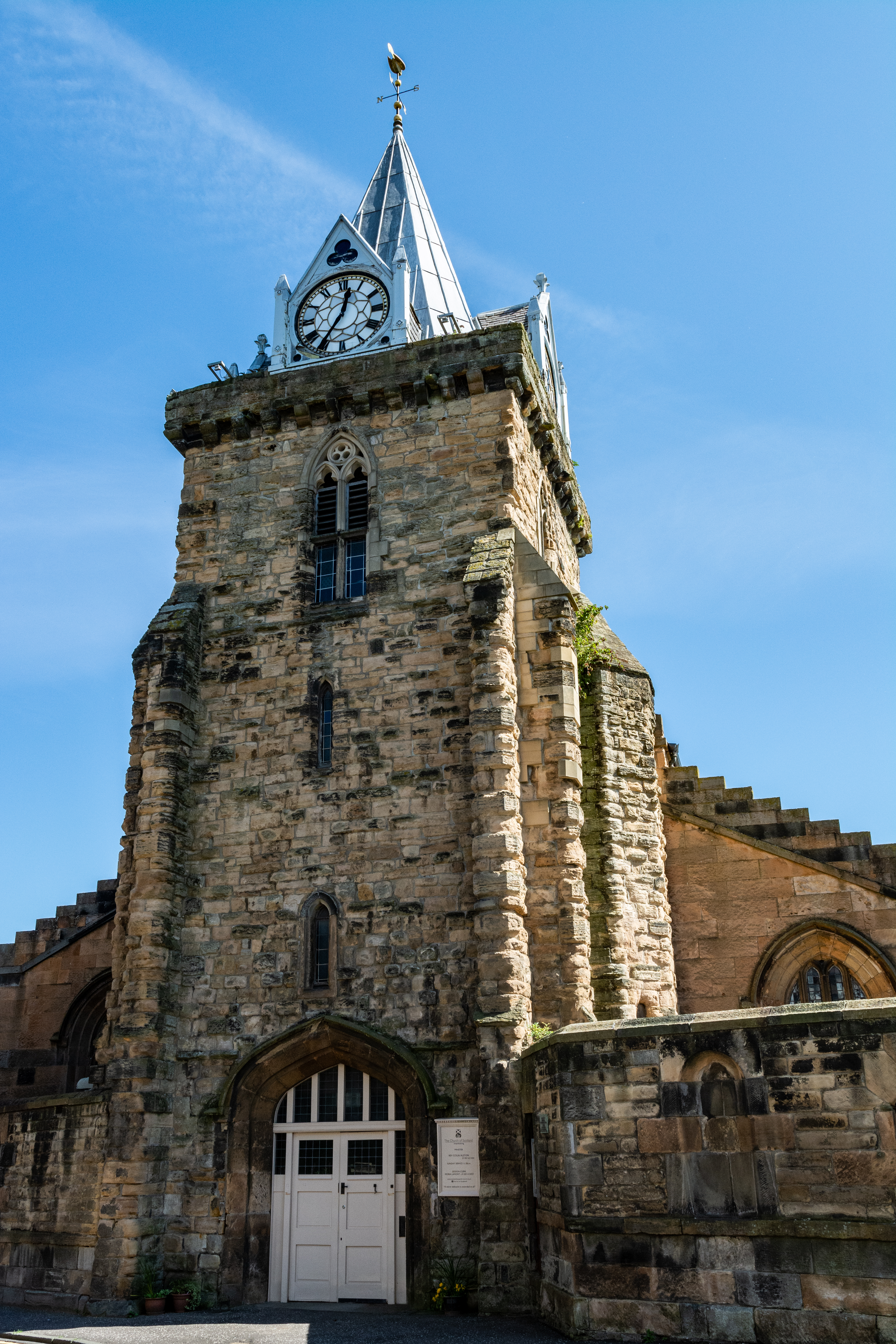
St Peter's Kirk, Inverkeithing

He studied Divinity at the University of St Andrews and graduated MA in 1597. He served as Clerk to the Presbytery of St Andrews from 1598 to 1606 and then served as assistant to the Rector at the university.

In 1610 the Archbishop of St Andrews nominated him to assist John Burne at Inverkeithing, who was in ill-health. In 1611 he took over as minister on a stipend of 320 merks per annum. He also oversaw the parish of Rosyth. In 1613 he was appointed Moderator to the Synod (a post later called Moderator of the General Assembly). In 1617 he was co-signator to the "Protestation for the Liberties of the Kirk". In April 1620 he was asked to appear at the Synod to explain his non-compliance with the Five Articles of Perth.

In 1631 he was awarded the land known as The Glebe in Inverkeithing (this name traditionally links to land attaching a Scottish manse).

He died in Inverkeithing on 23 June 1640. He was succeeded as minister of Inverkeithing by Walter Bruce, son of Sir John Bruce of Kincavil.

== Family ==
He married Isobel Greig, daughter of Matthew Greig. They had one son, John Roche.
