= Thomas Taylor (Scottish minister) =

Church of Scotland minister

Thomas Taylor (c.1770–1831) was a 19th century Church of Scotland minister, who served as Moderator of the General Assembly in 1826.

== Life ==
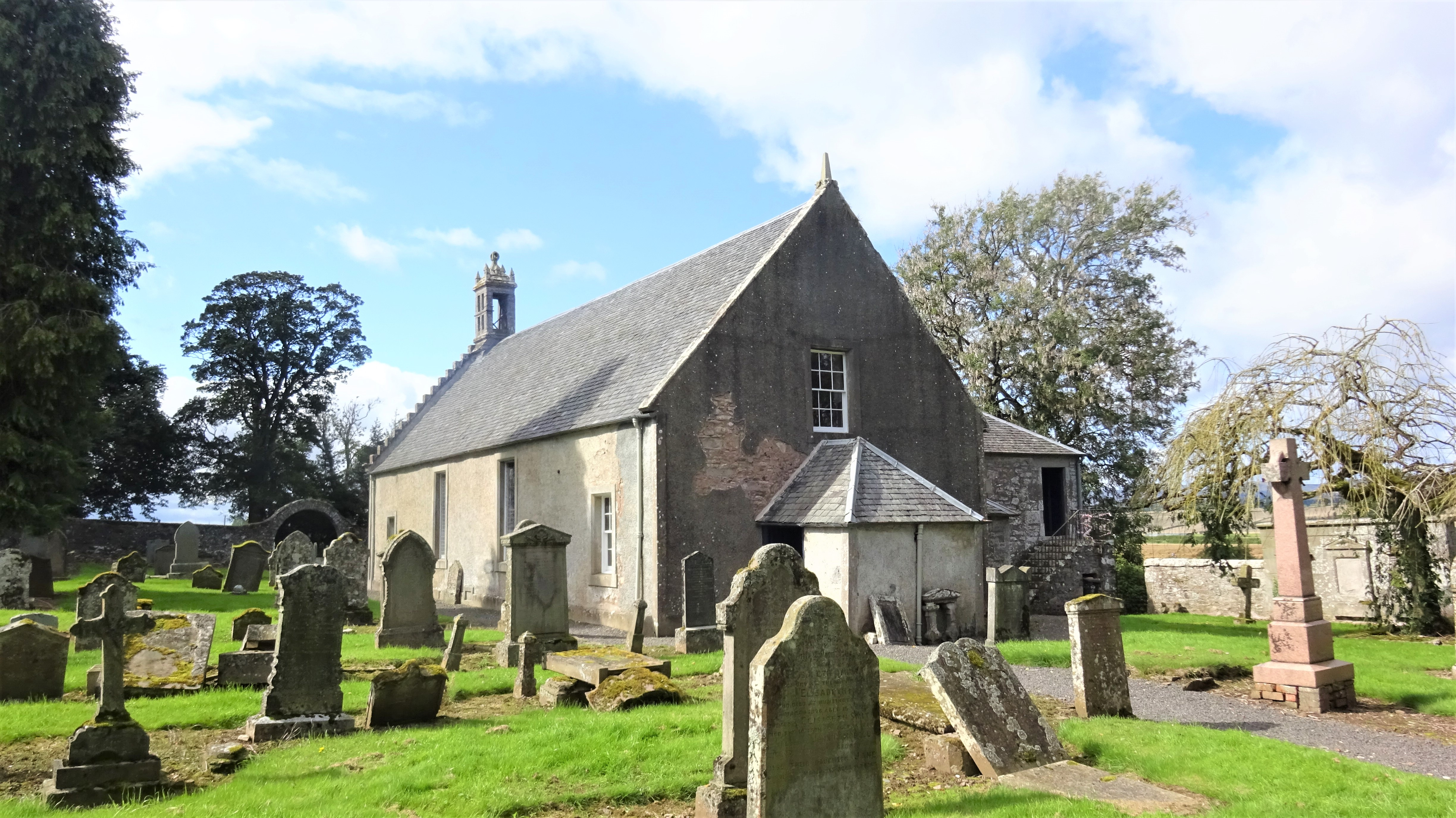
Tibbermore Church and graveyard

He was the son of John Taylor, a teacher in Kinross. He was licensed to preach by the Presbytery of Dunfermline in April 1793.

In October 1799 he was presented under patronage of King George III to the congregation of Tibbermore near Perth and was formally ordained there in February 1800. In June 1813 he was elected Presbytery Clerk to the General Assembly. In December 1822 Glasgow University awarded him an honorary Doctor of Divinity (DD).

In 1826 he succeeded Rev George Cook as Moderator of the General Assembly of the Church of Scotland, the highest position in the Scottish church.

He died on 7 December 1831. His position as minister of Tibbermore was filled by Rev William Weir Tulloch.

== Family ==
On 30 December 1800 he married Mary Alison, daughter of Charles Alison, a farmer at Innerpeffray. Their children included:

- Jane (1802-1874)
- Margaret (1804-1893) married Lt Col Kenneth Thomas Mackenzie of the HEICS
- Rev John Taylor (b.1805) minister of Drumelzier
- Mary (1812-1818)
