= Thomas Buchanan (moderator) =

Scottish minister (c. 1520–1599)

- Born: c. 1520; Scotland
- Died: 12 April 1599 (aged 78–79)
- Education: St Salvator's College
- Occupation: Minister
- Years active: 1569–1599
- Spouses: Elspeth Traill (died 1595) Eupham Hay (m. 1597)

Thomas Buchanan (c. 1520 – 12 April 1599) was a Church of Scotland minister who served as Moderator of the General Assembly in 1588.

== Early life and education ==
Buchanan was born around 1520.

He was the son of Thomas Buchanan of Drummakill and his wife, Giles Cunningham. His paternal uncle was the senior Scottish churchman and historian, George Buchanan. He studied at St Salvator's College in St Andrews and became a "regent" (the equivalent of Fellow) at the college around 1538.

== Career ==
He probably spent many years as a teacher before becoming joint Rector of the High School in Edinburgh in February 1569. At this time the school was housed in St Mary's in the Fields on the outskirts of the town. King James VI formally inducted him in the role in the Spring of 1569.

In 1571 he moved to be Master of the Grammar School in Stirling. In 1573 he described as having been a member of the "Royal Household" for many years, and therefore must be presumed to have also been a courtier. In August 1578 King James presented him as Provost of Kirkheuch, a secular definition linked to the parish of Ceres in Fife and was given £200 from the King for taking the role. The role also encompassed being parish minister of Ceres. In October 1582 he was nominated by the General Assembly to be one of the Masters of New College, St Andrews (now known as St Mary's College, St Andrews. This college specialised in teaching Divinity. This is the first clear indication that Buchanan had a deep knowledge of Theology.However, Buchanan declined this post.

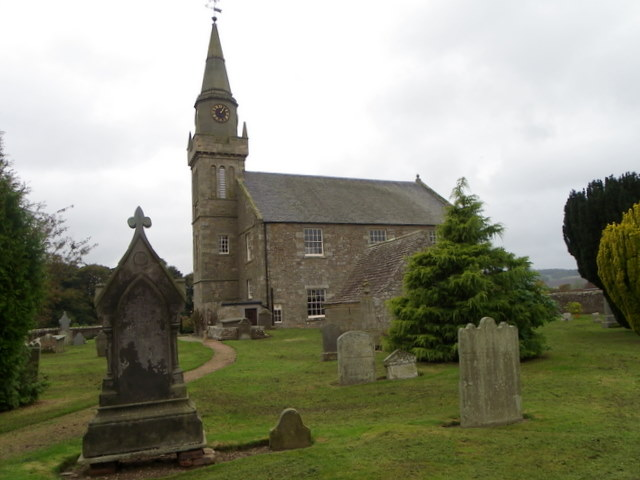
Ceres Parish Church

In 1587 the General Assembly made him "Commissioner for Fife". In 1588 he succeeded Rev Robert Bruce as Moderator of the General Assembly of the Church of Scotland the highest position in the Scottish church. He attended 26 out of the 31 General Assemblies occurring during his ministry.

In March 1589 the Privy Council made him Commissioner for the Preservation of the True Religion in Fife. In 1598 he was on the shortlist of three ministers who would represent the Church of Scotland as a Commissioner of the Kirk in the Scottish Parliament in Parliament Hall in Edinburgh.

== Personal life ==
He married Elspeth Traill (died 1595) daughter of John Traill the younger of Magask, widow of Robert Hamilton, Principal of New College, St Andrews and Moderator in 1572. Their daughter married Thomas Philip son of Rev Henry Philip, minister of Creich.

Around 1597 he married Eupham Hay who outlived him.

== Death ==
He died on 12 April 1599 following a fall from his horse. He was aged around 79. His position at Ceres was filled by his nephew Robert Buchanan.
