= Robert Patoun =

Church of Scotland minister

Robert Patoun AM (1690–1768) was an 18th-century Church of Scotland minister who served as Moderator of the General Assembly in 1750.

== Life ==
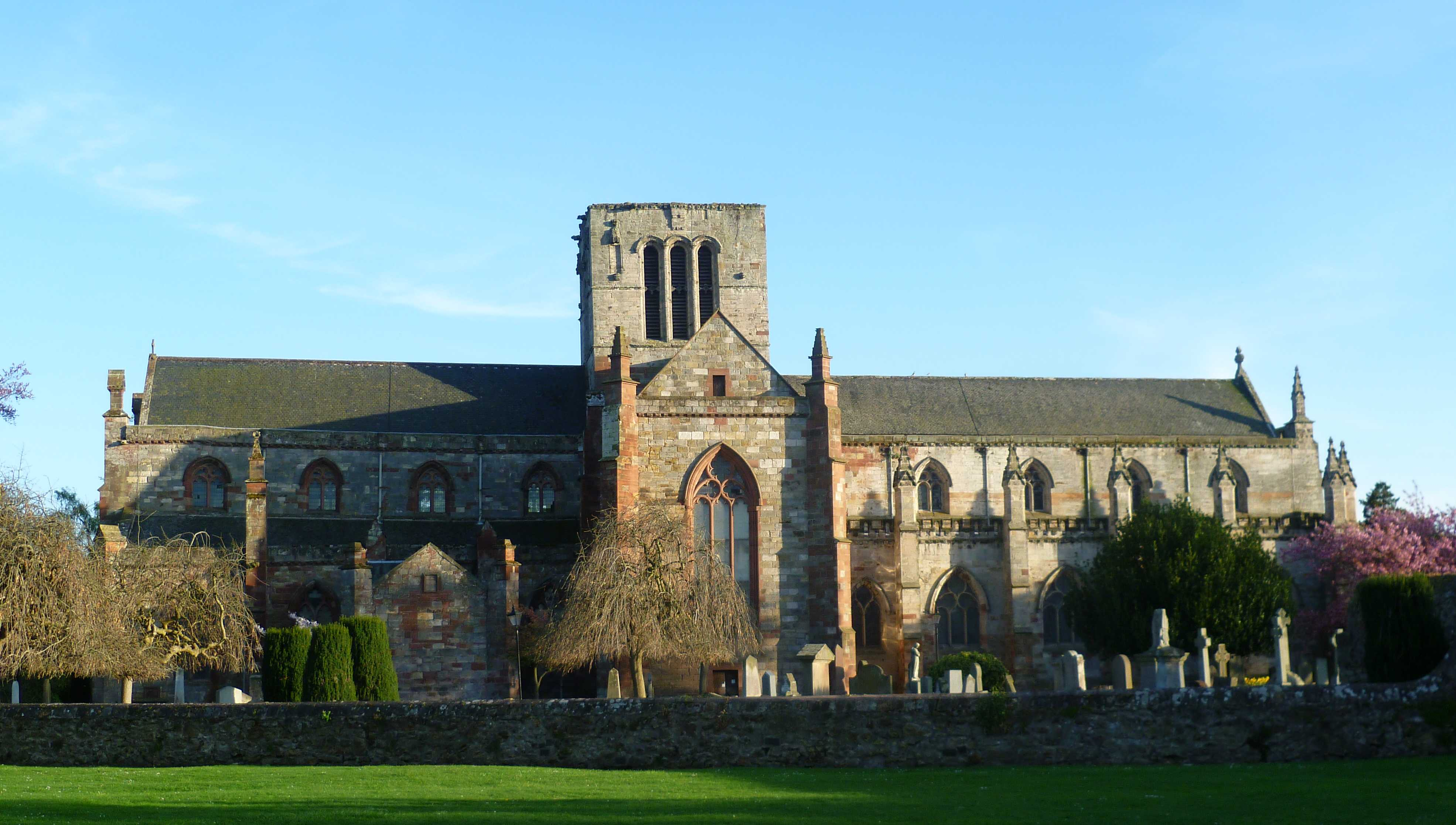
St. Mary's Kirk, Haddington

He was born in 1690 the son of Rev Robert Patoun of St Michael's Church in Dumfries and his third wife Barbara Fingass.

He studied at the University of Glasgow and graduated MA in May 1710. Only in 1721 was he licensed to preach by the Presbytery of Dunbar. It was normal practice at this time for such men to teach as private tutors while they awaited a position. Given the licensing body it is logical to presume he was tutoring o an East Lothian family.

His first position was ordination as "second charge" of the huge St Mary's Church in Haddington under Rev Patrick Wilkie in "first charge" in January 1722. In September 1730 he was presented to the congregation at Renfrew under patronage of King George II. He was formally translated to this new role in January 1731.

In 1750 he succeeded Rev Patrick Cumin as Moderator of the General Assembly of the Church of Scotland the highest position in the Scottish church. During his year in this role he worked on the augmentation of minister's stipends and his success in this led to a strong thanks in 1752.

He died in Renfrew on 1 April 1758.

== Family ==
In 1722 he married Cecilia Hamilton daughter of Rev Archibald Hamilton of Cambuslang. They had one son and one daughter:

- William Patoun, librarian of Glasgow University from 1747 to 1750
- Janet (b.1732)

== Publications ==
- The Main Duty of Bishops (1739)
