= Ceres, Fife =

Village in Scotland

Coordinates: 56.292131°N 2.970141°W

Ceres
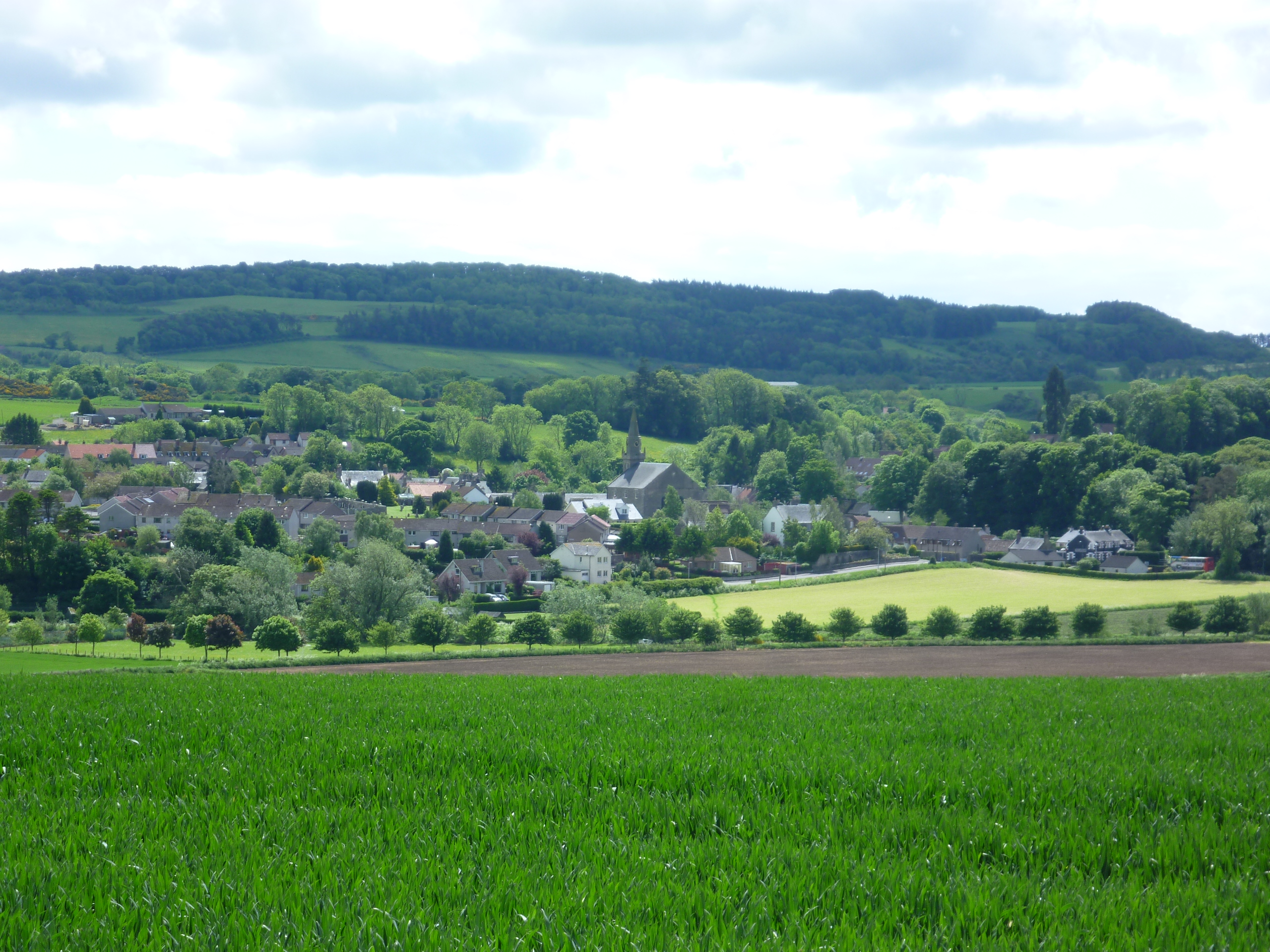

- Location within Fife
- Population: 930 (2020)
- OS grid reference: NO400115
- Council area: Fife
- Lieutenancy area: Fife
- Country: Scotland
- Sovereign state: United Kingdom
- Post town: CUPAR
- Postcode district: KY15
- Dialling code: 01334
- Police: Scotland
- Fire: Scottish
- Ambulance: Scottish
- UK Parliament: North East Fife
- Scottish Parliament: North East Fife

Ceres is a village in Fife, Scotland, located in a small glen approximately 2 miles (3 km) over the Ceres Moor from Cupar and 7 mi (11 km) from St Andrews. The former parish of that name included the settlements of Baldinnie, Chance Inn, Craigrothie, Pitscottie and Tarvit Mill.

The Italian balloonist Vincenzo Lunardi landed in the parish after his first flight in Scotland in 1785.

== Origin of the name ==
The village name signifies "place to the west" from the Scottish Gaelic Siar meaning 'west', probably in relation to St Andrews. Locational endings in -es are common in East Fife. Suggestions that the name originated from an early dedication of the local kirk, such as to "Saint Siris", Saint Cyrus or Saint Cyricus are now discounted.

== Notable sites ==
=== Folk Museum ===
The Fife Folk Museum is located in the village in a range of buildings including the old weigh-house where grain was weighed at a tron on market days. The building also served as a tolbooth for locking up minor offenders and the village jougs are still attached. The museum commemorates rural life of a bygone era. The museum began in 1968.

=== Parish church ===
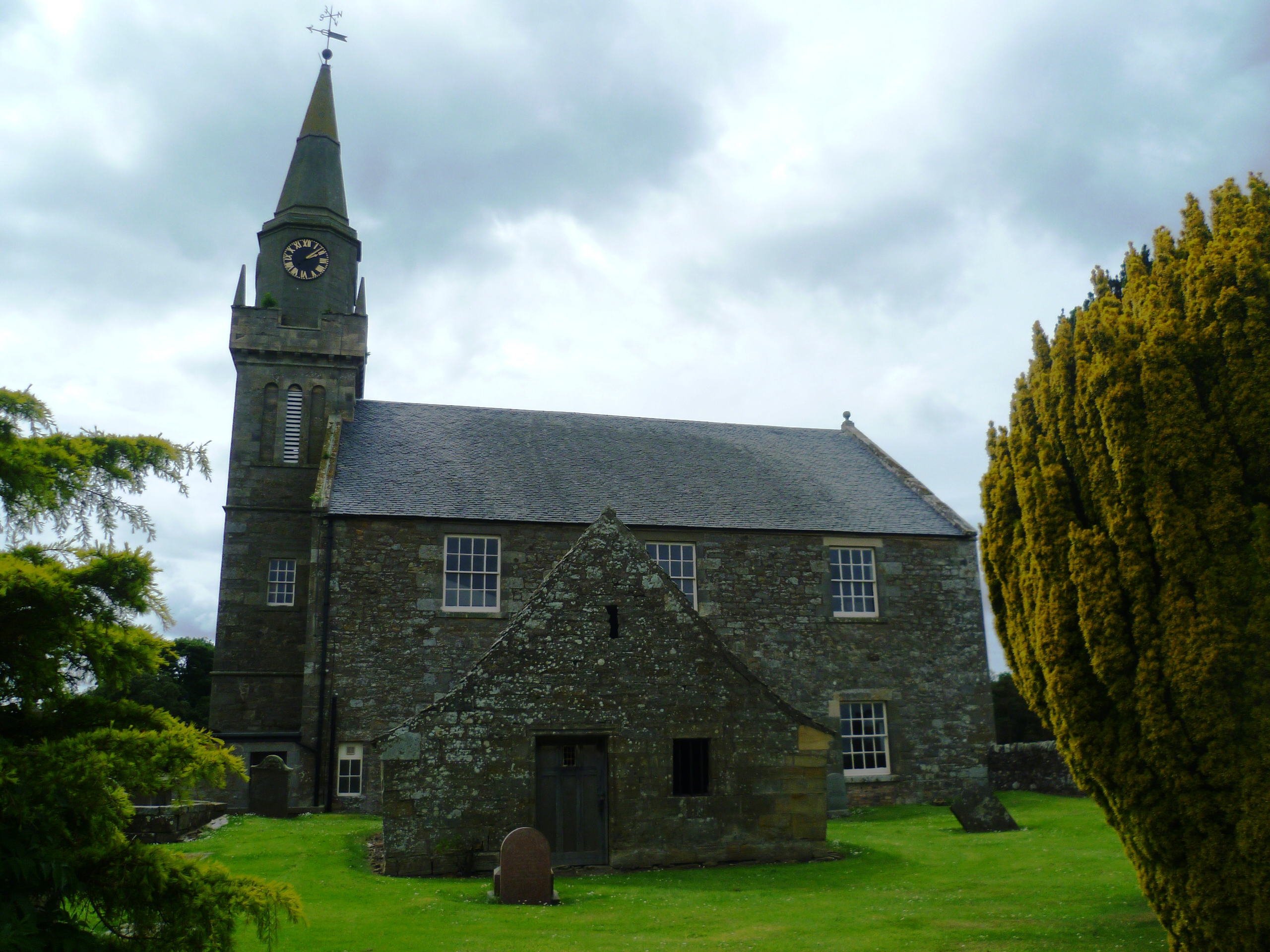
Ceres Church and Lindsay Mausoleum

The parish church was built in 1806 to a design by Alexander Leslie, A tower and octagonal spire were added in the 1850s. Apart from the addition of electric lighting and two early 20th-century stained glass windows (either side of the central pulpit), the interior is substantially unaltered from when first built and retains the gallery and original wooden box pews.

A mausoleum in the cemetery contains the grave of John Lindsay, 20th Earl of Crawford (1702–1749).

Ceres Church is within the Church of Scotland Presbytery of Fife. In 1983, the parish of Ceres was linked (and later united) with the neighbouring parish of Springfield. This united parish was further united with Kemback in 2005, and became known Ceres Kemback & Springfield Parish Church.

Two serving past ministers of Ceres have been Moderator of the General Assembly of the Church of Scotland: Thomas Buchanan (1588) and Rev Robert Arnot (1794).

== Notable persons ==
- Robert Arnot (1744–1808), Professor of Divinity and Moderator of the General Assembly of the Church of Scotland
- Thomas Buchanan (d. 1599) minister of Ceres 1578 to 1599, Moderator of the General Assembly of the Church of Scotland in 1588
- William Dalgleish (1832–1913), businessman and benefactor
- Jenny Gilruth MSP (born 1984), Deputy First Minister since May 2026
- Robert Fleming Gourlay (1788–1863), polemicist and author of the "Statistical Account of Upper Canada", 1822
- Thomas Halyburton (1674–1712), divine
- Sir Thomas Hope, 1st Baronet, (1573–1646), Lord Advocate
- Andrew Lemoncello (born 1982), long distance runner
- Robert Lindsay of Pitscottie (c. 1532–1580), chronicler
- Jimmy Methven, (1868–1953), Derby County FC player and manager
- Matthew Ross (born 1967), parish minister
- Sir John Scott of Scotstarvet (1585–1670), lawyer, statesman and author of The Staggering State of Scots Statesmen
- William Montgomery Watt (1909–2006), Islamicist
- James Wilson (1742–1798), signatory to the United States Declaration of Independence
