= Andrew J. Milne =

Scottish educator and minister

Andrew J Milne (died 1906) was a Scottish educator and minister who served as Moderator of the General Assembly of the Church of Scotland in 1905/6.

== Life ==
He was born around 1830.

He studied at Kings College, Aberdeen graduating MA in 1850. He became Headmaster of the Collegiate School in Kingston, Jamaica (founded 1853) under Rev Radcliffe, before becoming the Educational Inspector for Jamaica.

As an author he wrote on the life of Francis Lathom.

In 1870, having returned to Scotland, he became minister of Fyvie church and remained there for the rest of his life. He was elected Moderator in 1905 but died during his year in office, dying on 15 May 1906.
