= Gabriel Cunningham =

Church of Scotland minister

Gabriel Cunningham (c.1620–1691) was a Church of Scotland minister who served as Moderator of the General Assembly in 1652.

Due to ongoing debates regarding Scottish Episcopacy during his life he served three non-continuous spells as minister of Dunlop, Ayrshire.

== Life ==
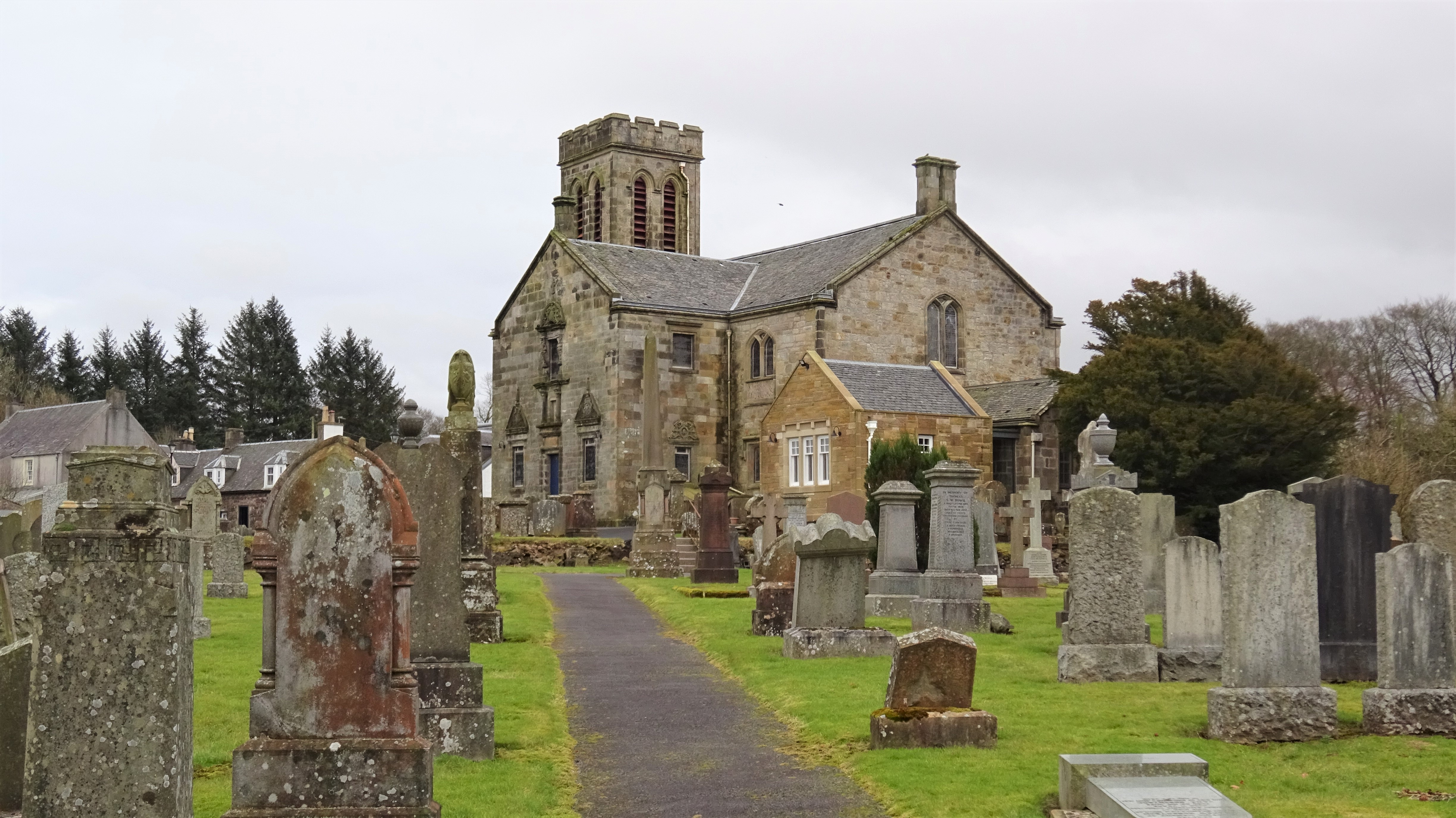
Dunlop Parish Church

Little is known of his early life. He graduated MA from Glasgow University in 1642. There seems some likelihood that he was the son or grandson of Gabriel Cunningham, three times Lord Provost of Glasgow, lastly in 1639 who, in turn, was probably grandson of Lord Gabriel Cuningham of Renfrewshire.

In 1648 the Laird of Dunlop acted as his patron and he was ordained as minister of Dunlop church in Ayrshire in place of the late Rev Hugh Eglinton.

In 1652 he succeeded Rev Robert Douglas as Moderator of the General Assembly of the Church of Scotland the highest position in the Scottish church.

He was deprived of office in 1664 for failing to accept the new rules of Episcopacy, seeing this as a return to Catholicism. His place was filled by William Torrie until 1672 when Cunningham was allowed to return to office. However, he did not immediately return, and only in June 1674 did he recommence, assisted by John Hay of Lady Yester's Church in Edinburgh. However, in 1683 he was deprived of office a second time, this time the Lord Advocate accusing him of harbouring "rebels". Alexander Lindsay filled the role 1685 to 1687 and Cunningham returned in 1687 after the "Toleration", but then aged around 66. The Act of Parliament of 25 April 1690 ended Episcopacy in the Church of Scotland and he then continued unencumbered. Much loved by his peers he preached at the first General Assembly following this event: 16 October 1690.

He died in May 1691 aged around 69.
