= Walter Bruce (Constant Moderator) =

Scottish minister

Walter Bruce (c.1605–1673) was a minister who served as 'Constant Moderator' of the General Assembly of the Church of Scotland from 1662 until 1673, a unique role in the history of the Church of Scotland. As such, Bruce was the longest serving leader of the Church of Scotland in history.

== Life ==
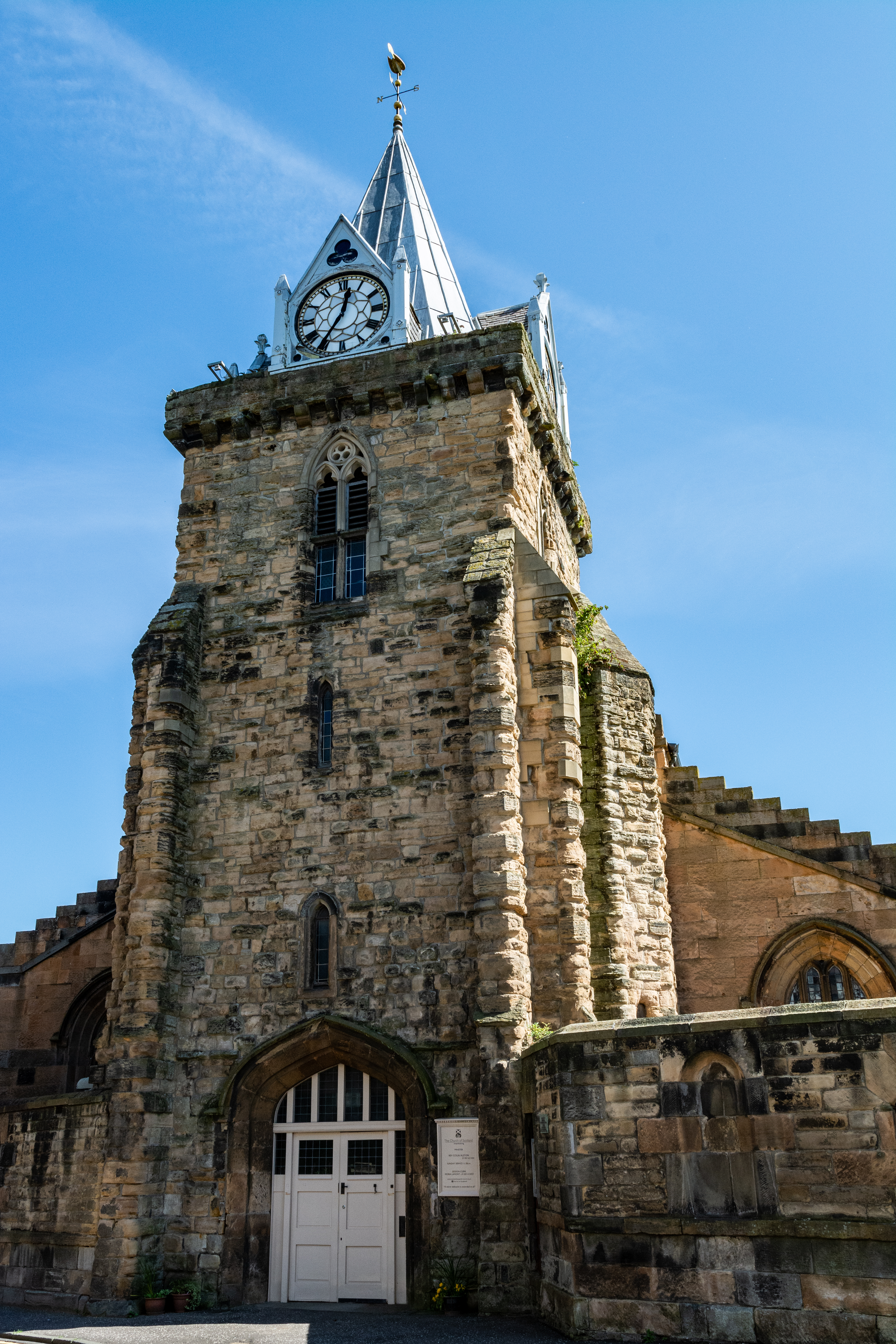
St Peter's Kirk in Inverkeithing

He was born the fourth son of Sir John Bruce of Kincavil (d. 1607) and his wife Jean Drummond. He studied Divinity at the University of St Andrews, graduating MA in 1628.

In 1641 he succeeded the late Robert Roche as minister of Inverkeithing, his patron being King Charles I. Inverkeithing at that time was one of the more important church positions. In 1649 he was suspended when it was discovered that he was part owner of a ship, a practice not permitted by church rules. Bruce played a pivotal role in initiating the so-called Great Scottish witch hunt of 1649-50, during which he was the person responsible for "pricking the witch" to decide her guilt.

On 14 October 1662 he was elected 'Constant Moderator'. This was during a period within which there was no General Assembly of the Church of Scotland. There was no such role before or since. However, this unique role means he was the longest serving leader of the Church of Scotland.

He died in Inverkeithing in February or March of 1673.

== Family ==
In May 1654 he was married to Jean Menzies (d.1691) daughter of Alexander Menzies of Rotwell and widow of Rev John Liddell of Scone. Although she had children by her previous marriage (whom they raised) they had no children of their own.

His younger brother Rev Robert Bruce (c. 1607-1667) was minister of Aberdour Parish Church.
