= Andrew Hay (moderator) =

Scottish minister, and Moderator

- Church: Renfrew

Personal details
- Born: c.1540
- Died: 1593
- Education: Glasgow University

Moderator of the General Assembly
- In office 1573–1574

Moderator of the General Assembly
- In office 1580–1581

Rector of the University of Glasgow
- In office 1569–1586

Andrew Hay of Renfield (c.1540–1593) was a Scottish minister who served twice as Moderator of the General Assembly of the Church of Scotland in both 1573/4 and 1580/1. From 1569 to 1586 he was also Rector of the University of Glasgow.

== Life ==
Hay was born the son of William Hay, 4th Laird of Talla in Tweedsmuir and Janet Spottiswood. His older brother George Hay of Rathven was Moderator in 1571. He graduated MA from Glasgow University

In 1556 Hay was prependary of Renfrew and by 1558 both pastor and rector of the parish. In 1559 he openly joined the Reformers and remained in Renfrew as its first minister of the Church of Scotland. He was appointed Commissary of Hamilton and Dalserf in 1564. In March 1566 he was accused of being involved in the plot to murder David Riccio and during investigation of this he was "confined in free ward" to stay within two miles of Dunbar. He was released on order of Mary Queen of Scots in January 1567. In January 1571 he was elected Dean of Chapter representing Glasgow churches. He was church Commissioner for the tree districts of Clydesdale, Renfrew and Lennox from 1569 to 1588 and added both Govan and Inchinnan from 1574.

In 1569, Hay became Rector of Glasgow University and was instrumental in bringing Andrew Melville as Principal in 1570. He resigned as Rector in 1586. James Boyd was Chancellor at this time.

Hay attended 34 of the 40 General assemblies between 1560 and 1590. In 1574 he succeeded the Alexander Arbuthnot as Moderator of the General Assembly of the Church of Scotland the highest position in the Scottish Church. In 1580 he served a second term in succession to James Lawson, serving until 1581 when he was succeeded in turn by Robert Pont.

In March 1589 the Privy Council appointed Hay Commissioner for the Maintenance and Defence of the True Religion in Clydesdale. On his death in 1593 he bequeathed a large portion of his books to Glasgow University Library.

== Family ==
Hay married Janet Margaret Wallace of Craigie. Their children included:

- Theodara Jean Hay married John Couper
- John Hay minister of Renfrew
- Theodore Hay, minister of Peebles
- Andrew Hay minister of Erskine later moving to Mearns.
- David Hay, commissary clerk of Glasgow
- Susannah Hay

Between Andrew Hay, his son John and grandson John, the Hays ministered to the parish of Renfrew from 1560 to 1649 (when John the younger was dismissed for a nominal charge of drunkenness.

== Publications ==
- Second Book of Discipline (with Andrew Melville, 1578)

== Bibliography ==
- Reg. Assig.
- Calderwood's Hist, [see General Index there, p. 70]
- Nisbet's Heraldry, ii.
- Coutts' Hist, of Univ. of Glasgow
- Pitcairn's Criminal Trials, i., 486
- P. C. Reg., vii., 580.
