= James A. McClymont =

Scottish minister

James Alexander McClymont CBE VD (1848–1927) was a Scottish minister who served as Moderator of the General Assembly of the Church of Scotland in 1921.

== Life ==
He was Principal Chaplain to the Royal Army Chaplains' Department in the First World War.

His duties as Moderator in 1921/22 included unveiling the stained glass windows at St Laurence Church in Forres.

In 1924 a sermon by McClymont on the "League of Nations" was broadcast from Edinburgh on radio by the BBC.

== Publications ==
- The New Testament and its Writers (1899)
- Greece (1906), illustrations by John Fulleylove
- The New Century Bible: St John (1930)
