= George Hay (minister) =

George Hay (c.1530–1588) was a Church of Scotland minister immediately after the Reformation, who served as Moderator of the General Assembly from March 1571.

== Life ==
He was born around 1539 a younger son of William Hay 5th Laird of Talla near Tweedsmuir, and his wife Janet Spottiswood, a sister or close cousin of John Spottiswood.

In the earliest years of the Reformation (July 1558) he is mentioned as "Rector of Rathven". He was certainly a Roman Catholic priest pre-Reformation, having been granted a dispensation from Pope Paul IV allowing him a joint benefice from both Rathven and "Eddleston", showing that he was serving both these communities. If this "Eddleston" is the same the Eddleston of the Scottish Borders this is a very considerable journey in the 16th century. In January 1560 he granted "kirk lands" at Rathven and Eddleston to his brother William Hay of Barro.

In October 1561, in the study of James McGill in Edinburgh, Hay was one of the group of clergy who jointly agreed to deprive Mary Queen of Scots of the Catholic mass. In June 1562 the General Assembly asked him to support Superintendent John Willock in preaching at the vacant post at Carrick. Together they promoted the Protestant cause in Kyle and were present at the signing of the Covenant in Ayr on 4 September. Later in Maybole he confronted the Abbot of Crossraguel regarding his continuation of the Catholic mass.

In May 1563 he sold the prebendal manse at Eddleston. This was not the "true manse" and was a house on Rotten Row in Glasgow which provided a rental income to the parish of Eddleston.

He appears to have lived some time in Glasgow (possibly in the Rotten Row property) and signed documents as "George Hay, Canon of Glasgow" for some years. In December 1563 he is also described as Minister of the Privy Council and in 1564 is described as Minister of the Scottish Court.

In 1565 he was commissioned by the General Assembly to inspect kirks, schools and colleges to "eradicate idolatry" between the River Dee and River Spey. Meanwhile the Assembly permitted him a stipend for both his parishes on condition he could supply a preacher to fill his position. However he was officially rebuked for non-compliance at Eddleston.

In March 1571, he succeeded Robert Pont as Moderator of the General Assembly of the Church of Scotland the highest position in the Scottish church. This Assembly met in Stirling rather than Edinburgh.

In 1574, three further parishes were placed in his charge: Forsken, Dundurcus and Bellie. In 1575 he was made Commissioner of Caithness

In 1577, he undertook a major journey to Magdeburg with clergy from all of northern Europe to participate in the Augsburg Confession.

In July 1578, the Scottish Parliament appointed him Visitor (Inspector) for the College of Aberdeen. In 1585, he became Commissioner for Banff.

He died in 1588.

== Family ==
He married Marion Henderson (d.1577) of Fordell. Their children included:

- George Hay of Rannes
- James Hay of Rannes (died c. 1630)
- William Hay, a burgess tailor in Edinburgh
- Janet

== Publications ==
- The Confutation of the Abbot of Crossraguel's Masse (1563)
- Against Tyrie the Jesuit (1573)
