= William Gloag =

William Gloag may refer to:

- William Gloag (lawyer) (1865–1934), Scottish lawyer and academic
- William Gloag, Lord Kincairney (1828–1909), Scottish judge
- William Gloag (minister) (c. 1735–1802), Church of Scotland minister
