= West St Giles' Parish Church =

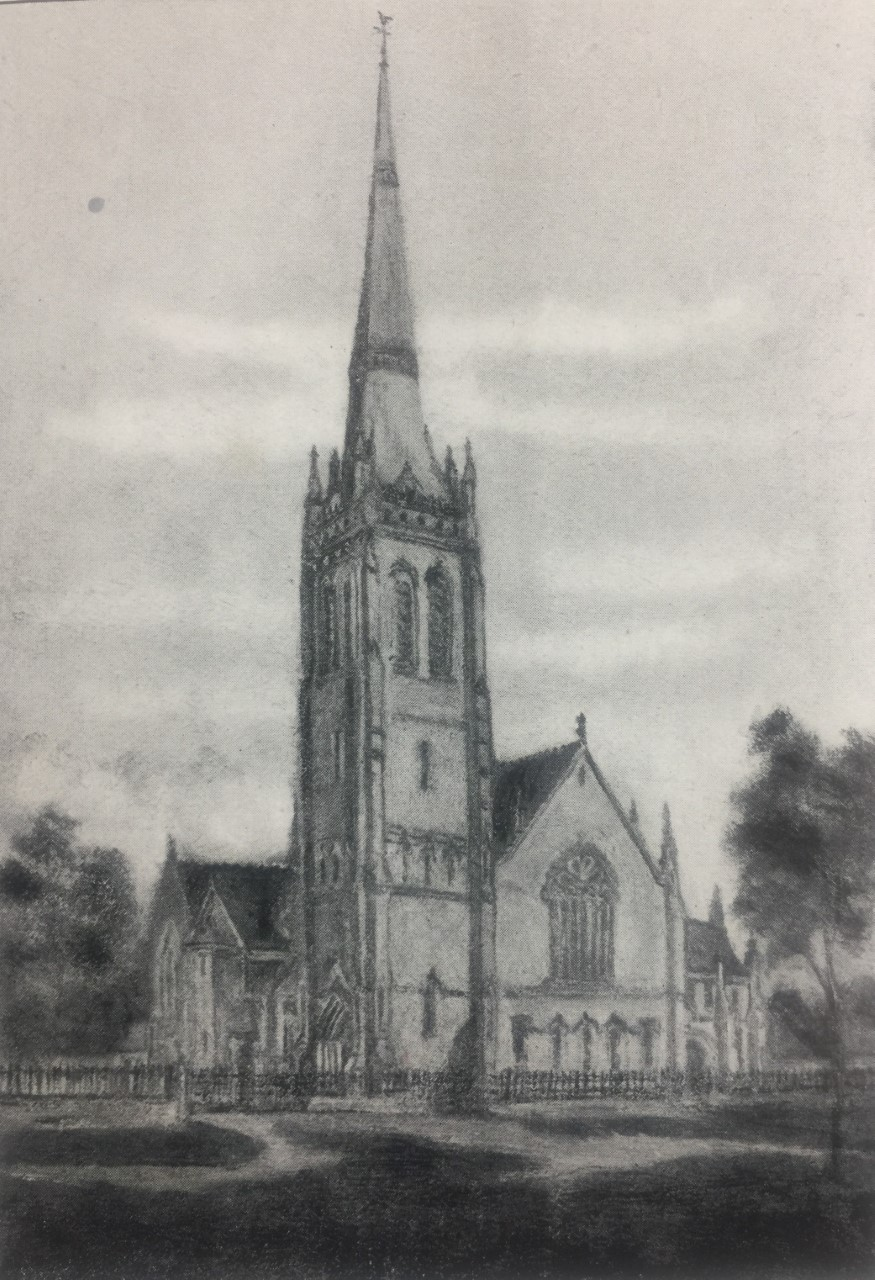
- West St Giles' Parish Church, Marchmont
- West St Giles' Parish Church
- 55°56′22.7″N 3°11′34.3″W
- Location: Meadow Place, Edinburgh
- Country: Scotland
- Denomination: Church of Scotland

History
- Former name(s): Haddo's Hole Kirk (1699–1829); New North Church (18th century–c1859)
- Founded: 1699
- Consecrated: 1883

Architecture
- Architect: Hardy & Wight
- Style: Gothic Revival
- Groundbreaking: 1881
- Completed: 1883
- Construction cost: £7,000
- Closed: 1972
- Demolished: 1974

Specifications
- Height: 160 ft (49 m)

West St Giles' Parish Church was a parish church of the Church of Scotland and a burgh church of Edinburgh, Scotland. Occupying the Haddo's Hole division of St Giles' from 1699, the church was then based in Marchmont between 1883 and its closure in 1972.

The congregation's origins are in a meeting-house on Castlehill, founded after the 1687 Declaration of Indulgence. Following the re-establishment of Presbyterianism in the Church of Scotland, the congregation occupied the north-western division of St Giles'. This was known as Haddo's Hole (or Hold) in reference to John Gordon of Haddo: a leading royalist, who was imprisoned there before his execution in 1644. When William Burn launched a major project of alterations at St Giles' in 1829, the congregation (by then also known as the New North Kirk) vacated the building, returning in 1843. With the restoration of St Giles' under William Chambers, West St Giles' departed its historic home, occupying a new church in Marchmont from 1883. In 1972, the congregation united with Grange Parish Church on Kilgraston Road in the Grange and Warrender Parish Church on Whitehouse Loan in Bruntsfield to form Marchmont St Giles' Parish Church.

Until a reallocation of parishes in 1929, West St Giles' parish was in the Old Town. Ministers including Charles John Brown (who led out the New North Free Church at the Disruption) and Robert Nisbet were notable for their active, evangelistic approach to ministry. Six ministers of the church served as moderator of the General Assembly of the Church of Scotland during their incumbencies.

The church's building stood on the corner of Meadow Place and Argyle Park Terrace in Marchmont, facing onto the Meadows. Designed by Hardy & Wight in the Decorated Gothic style, it could house 1,000 worshippers and included a prominent steeple, whose parapet quoted that of the tower of St Giles'. The building was demolished in 1974 and replaced by a care home for the elderly.

== History ==
=== Early years ===
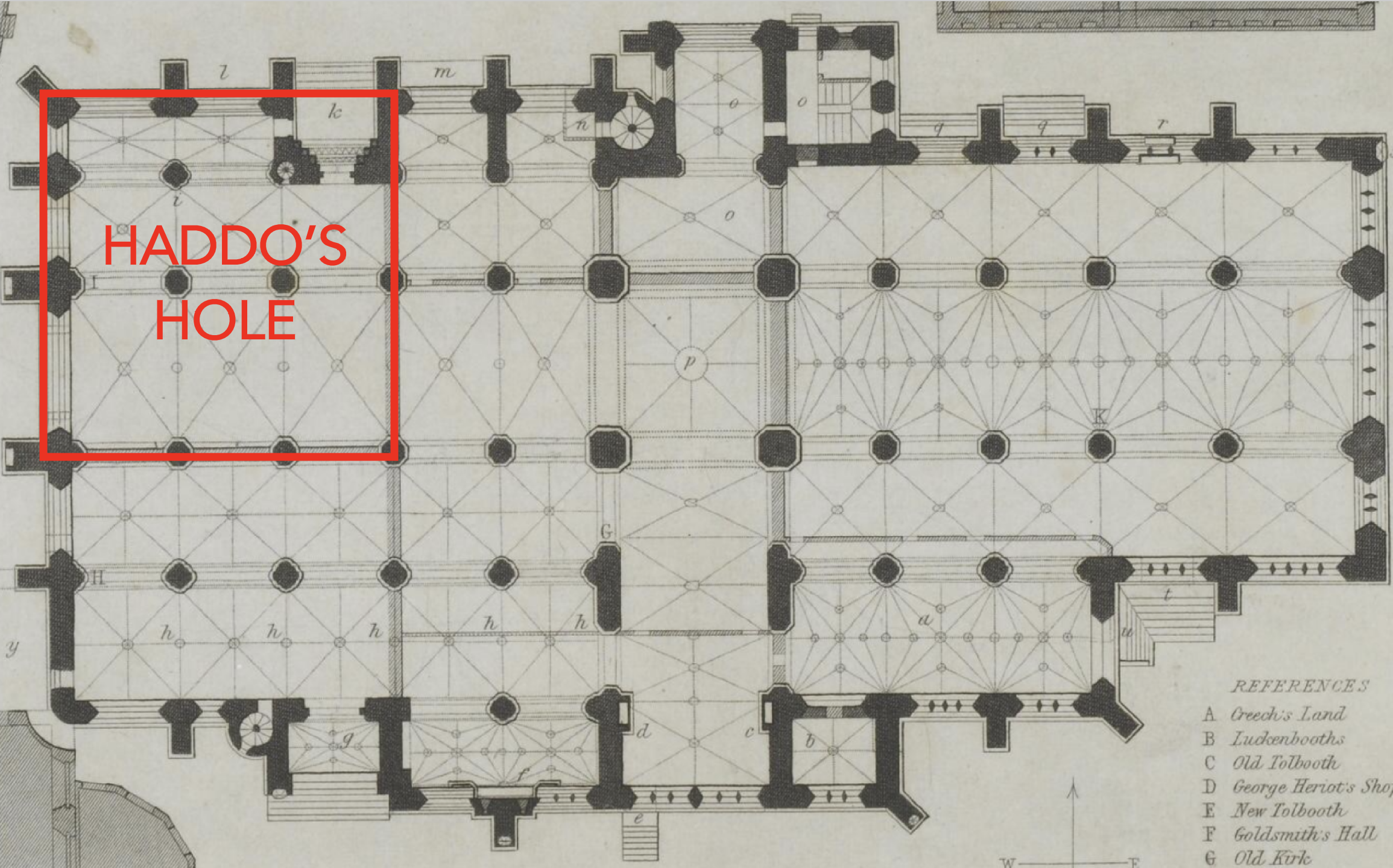
The Haddo's Hole division of St Giles' prior to 1829

Castlehill is recorded as a site of a meeting-house for Presbyterians after James VII extended toleration to them in 1687, during a period of episcopacy in the Church of Scotland. James Kirkton ministered here until he was called to the Tolbooth in 1691. Thomas Wilkie, minister of the second charge in the Tolbooth, was offered the ministry of the meeting-house. Wilkie refused as, even though Presbyterianism had been re-established in the Church of Scotland following the Revolution, the meeting-house was not legally recognised. He was instead appointed to Lady Yester's. Samuel Halliday is recorded as having been admitted to a meeting-house at the Lawnmarket in 1693. This was likely the same as the Castlehill meeting-house.

There had been an earlier attempt to found a church at Castlehill. In 1636, the town council moved to erect two new churches: one at Castlehill and another on the High Street at Peebles' Wynd. Work commenced the following year; however, the cost of both proved burdensome. The foundations of the church at Castlehill were therefore pulled down and funds and efforts directed towards the construction of the other church, which became the Tron Kirk.

In 1698, the burgh apportioned the meeting-house a parish covering an area of the burgh west of St Giles'. The burgh records for 27 January 1699 show that George Lawson and John Wardrop were given a warrant to take down the Lawnmarket meeting-house and to furnish the north-western division of St Giles' (known as "Haddo's Hole") as a church for its congregation. The new church was one of Edinburgh's burgh churches: its two ministers were supported by the town council out of local taxes.

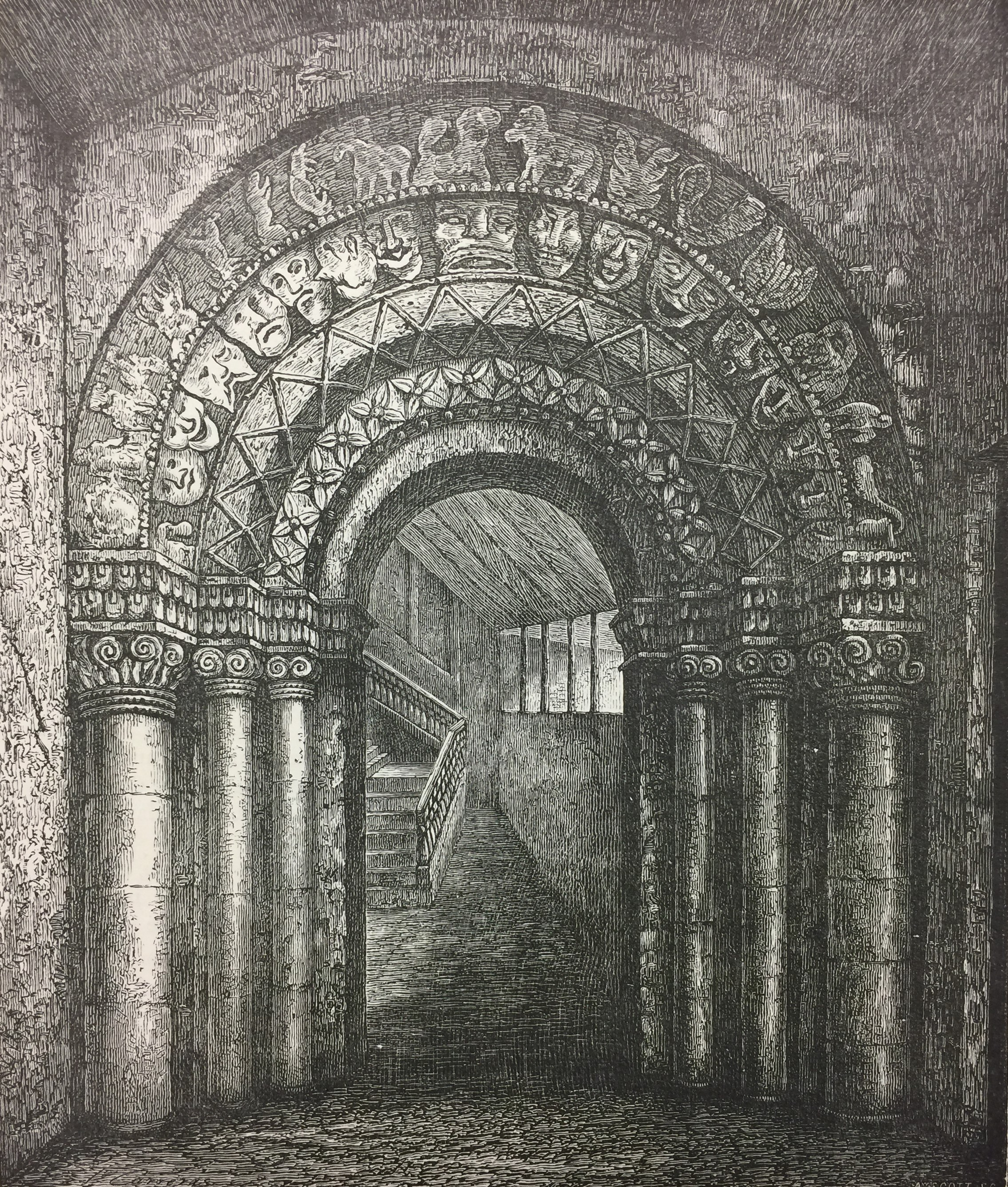
The Romanesque doorway of Haddo's Hole, removed at the end of the 18th century

Following the Reformation, St Giles' had been partitioned internally into smaller churches. Some time between the Restoration and the Revolution, the westernmost division, housing the Tolbooth Kirk, was partitioned into northern and southern parts. The northern part, forming the north-western corner of St Giles', became known as "Haddo's Hole" (or "Hold") in reference to John Gordon of Haddo: a leading royalist, who was imprisoned in the room above the north porch prior to his execution in 1644. Some sources also refer to it as the "Little Kirk" due to its size. Prior to its occupation by the congregation, the partition was used as a law court. Recalling the entry to Haddo's Hole prior to William Burn's restoration of St Giles' of 1829–1833, Josiah Livingston wrote:

To this we entered by a large door somewhat to the west of the present main entrance, which door gave access to the entrance hall common to all the churches and to the High Police Office, which, with its Court Room, found some sort of accommodation above the entrance hall, and made a very dark and prison-like aisle.

Until its removal and destruction at the end of the 18th century, a Romanesque doorway formed the north entrance to the Haddo's Hole division. This was the only piece of the original 12th-century St Giles' building to remain in situ.

=== Itinerancy: 1829–1843 ===
In 1829, major work on St Giles' under William Burn began and the New North Kirk was compelled to vacate the building. The church first met at the Methodist Chapel on Nicolson Square in the Southside. At the time of its first removal from St Giles', the congregation was the largest of the four then worshipping in the building. Soon after the move, John Bruce succeeded Robert Gordon as minister. The congregation grew further and included many students of divinity.

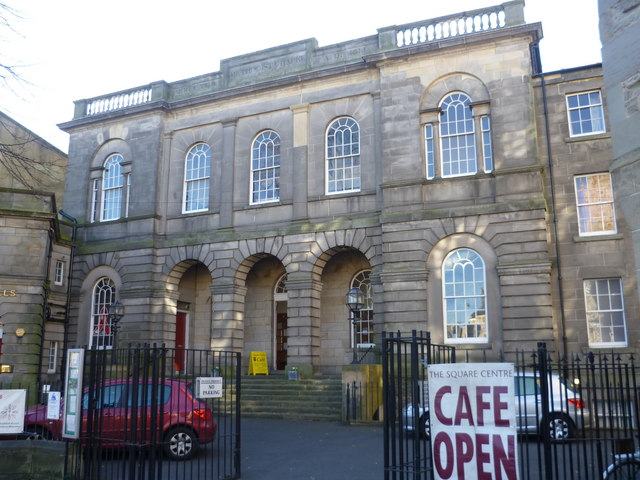
The Methodist Chapel on Nicolson Square: meeting place of the New North Church between 1829 and 1835

The town council found the rent on the Methodist Chapel to be too high and, in 1835, the congregation moved to the Brighton Street Chapel in the Bristo. (Note: The Brighton Street Chapel had been opened in 1827 for a Relief congregation. The congregation found the feu duty to be onerous and had vacated the building by 1834.) One New North worshipper, Josiah Livingston, later recalled the Brighton Street Chapel as draughty and acoustically poor. At Bruce's departure for St Andrew's in 1837, many of the congregation left with him. In 1835, 875 had received communion at the Methodist Chapel. Two years later, the figure had declined to 582.

Charles John Brown became minister in 1837. Though initially met with indifference, Brown helped to revive the church. He emphasised missionary work and divided the parish into districts, each under the supervision of an elder. By the April 1843, the number of communicants had recovered somewhat to 638.

With the completion of Burn's alterations of St Giles', the four internal divisions were reduced to three and the western part was occupied by the Tolbooth Kirk. The New North congregation had expected to occupy a new church at Castlehill in the vicinity of its parish. But the building, the Victoria Hall, was, at its completion in 1843, assigned to the Tolbooth Kirk and a new parish south and east of St Giles' was designated for the New North Kirk.

=== Disruption and recovery: 1843–1881 ===
At the Disruption of 1843, Brown led a significant portion of his congregation out of the established church and into the newly established Free Church. In October that year, only 95 received communion in the established congregation. Those leaving the Church of Scotland formed a new congregation New North Free, which counted 650 members by 1848.

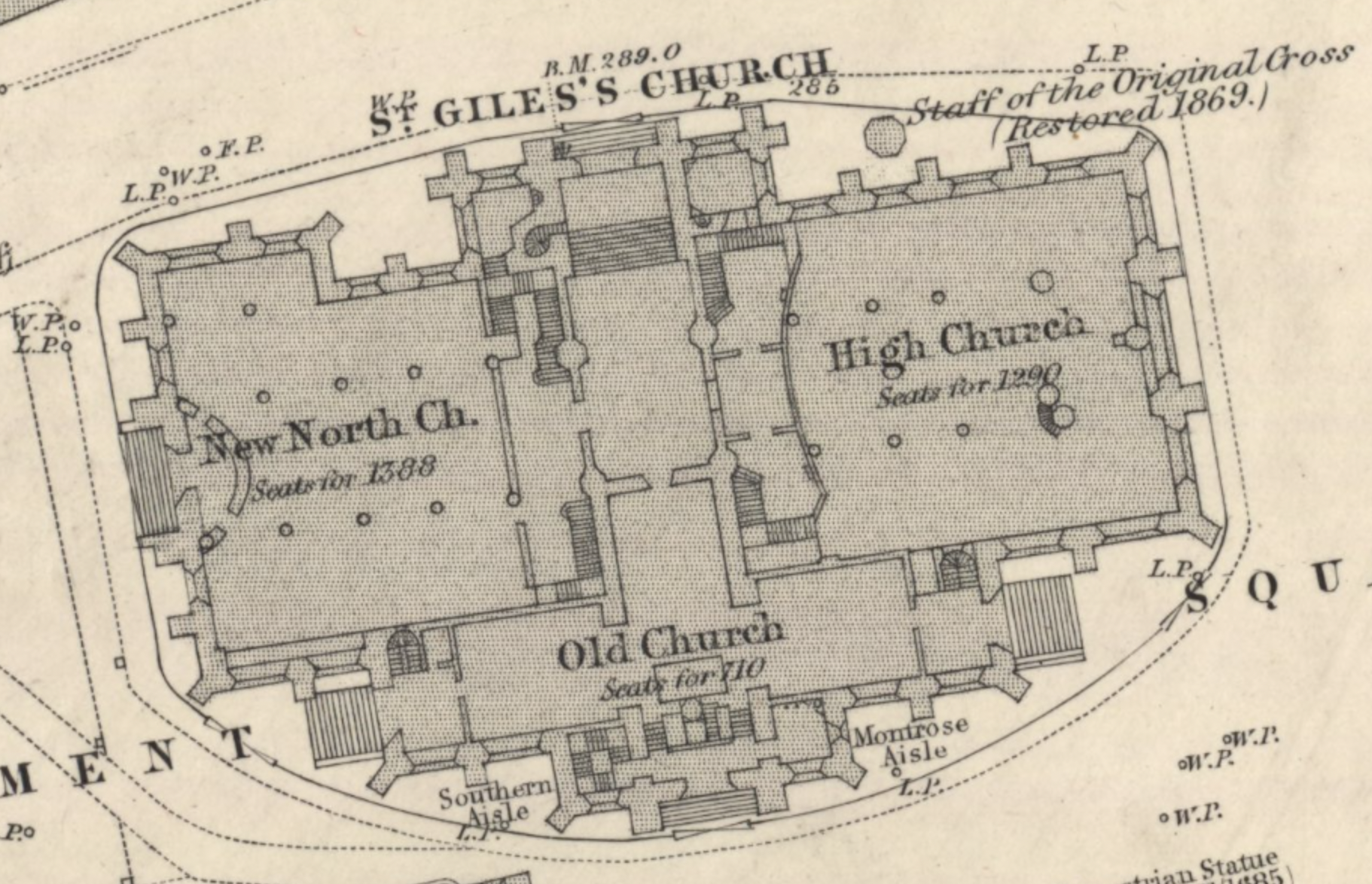
St Giles' Cathedral as it was divided internally between 1833 and 1883: the New North Church is at the left of the image

1843 was also the year the New North Kirk returned to St Giles', occupying the western half of the church. That December, Robert Nisbet was appointed minister and the congregation grew, numbering 517 communicants by April 1857. During Nisbet's ministry, the church came to be known as West St Giles': all church records from 1859 onwards refer to the church by that name.

In the latter part of the 19th century, the church's parish covered one of the most overcrowded parts of Edinburgh, many of whose inhabitants were Roman Catholics, recently arrived from Ireland. In 1870, Nisbet, in an attempt to aid the church's mission, revived the practice of ordaining deacons, which had fallen out of use in the late 18th century. This appears to have been unsuccessful and the church's records make no mention of deacons after 1877.

In 1873, the High Kirk, which occupied the eastern half of St Giles', had been restored on the initiative of William Chambers. Chambers sought to remove the church's internal partition walls and create a unified interior for the first time since the 16th century. In 1879, West St Giles' agreed to vacate the building on the condition alternative accommodation could be found. Initially, the removal date was planned for Whitsunday 1880 but as the removal required an act of parliament, the process was delayed and the removal date revised to May 1882. With a gift of £10,000, the congregation purchased Meadow Lodge on Meadow Place in Marchmont for £2,400 as the site for a new church. At the time, the population of Marchmont was increasingly rapidly and the new church stood at the end of Argyle Park Terrace, which had only recently been completed. Keen to advance the restoration of St Giles', Chambers gifted the congregation a tin tabernacle on Bruntsfield Links as an interim church. The congregation worshipped in St Giles' for the last time on 10 July 1881.

=== Marchmont: 1881–1972 ===
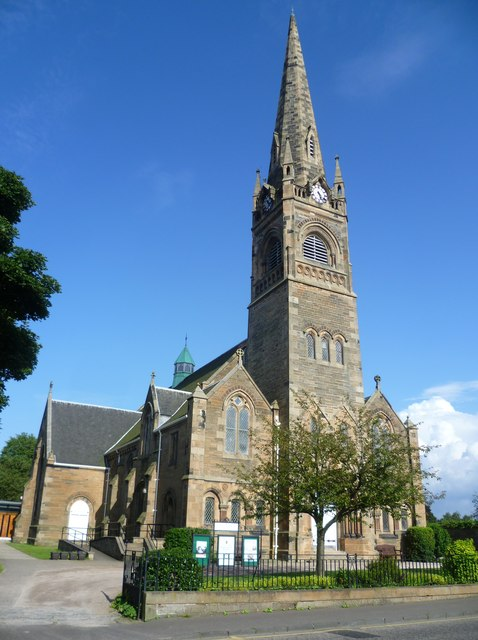
Marchmont St Giles' Parish Church on Kilgraston Road in the Grange: the current congregation was formed in 1972 by the union of West St Giles', Warrender, and Grange, using the Grange buildings

Following a competition judged by John MacVicar Anderson, honorary secretary of RIBA, Hardy & Wight were selected as architects for the new church. Henry Hardy was himself the grandson of Thomas Hardy: an 18th-century minister of the New North Kirk. The foundation stone laid by the Earl of Aberdeen. The new building opened on 17 January 1883 with three services conducted respectively by Robert Flint, Wallace Williamson, and James Mitchell. Among those present at the opening were Lord Provost George Harrison and members of the town council; Lord Glencorse; and Andrew Douglas Maclagan. In 1899, the congregation purchased a manse at 39 Lauder Road in the Grange.

While the new church was in Marchmont, its parish remained around a mile away, covering a portion of the Old Town on the south side of the High Street between Hunter Square in the east and George IV Bridge in the west, and also covering part of the north side of the Cowgate. From the time of the move, the congregation maintained a presence in its parish by renting the old Merchant Company hall in Hunter Square for use as a mission. As well as worship, the hall hosted groups such as a mothers' meeting, a girls' club, and a children's church and Sunday school. In 1892, the Merchant Company sold the property to the Royal Bank of Scotland and the congregation purchased mission premises at 128 High Street.

With the union of the Church of Scotland and the United Free Church in 1929, the congregation was allocated a parish closer to the church building. At this point, the congregation disposed of its mission halls in the Old Town. On 11 June 1972, the congregation united with Grange Parish Church on Kilgraston Road in the Grange and Warrender Parish Church on Whitehouse Loan in Bruntsfield to form Marchmont St Giles' Parish Church. The united congregation used the Grange buildings. West St Giles' was demolished in 1974 and replaced by a block of flats built for the Viewpoint Housing Association to a designs of Michael Calthrop & Campbell Mars in 1979. The flats provide sheltered accommodation for the elderly and some of the building's early inhabitants had been congregants of West St Giles'. With the union, West Giles' status as a burgh church transferred to Marchmont St Giles'.

== Ministers ==
Initially the church was a collegiate charge: that is, one with two ministers. Collegiate status ended in 1814, when a minister was required for St George's Church. Six ministers of the church served as moderator of the General Assembly of the Church of Scotland during their incumbencies: James Smith in 1731; John Gowdie in 1733; Robert Wallace in 1743; James Brown in 1777; Thomas Hardy in 1793; George Husband Baird in 1800.

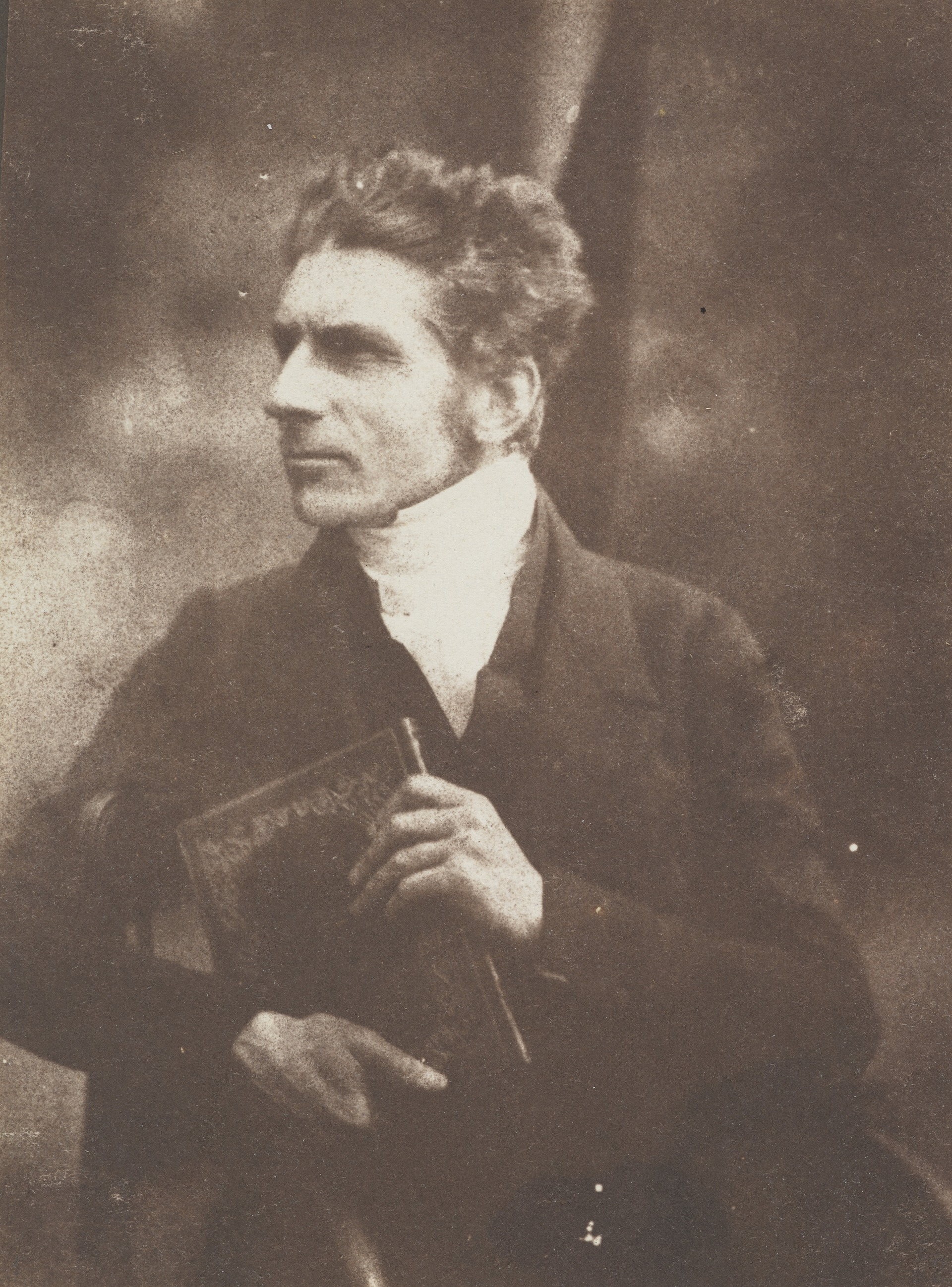
Charles John Brown: minister of the New North Kirk between 1837 and the Disruption of 1843

Ministers of the first charge:

1699–1705 George Andrews
1710–1730 John Flint
1730–1732, 1733–1736 James Smith
1732–1733 John Gowdie
1738–1771 Robert Wallace
1772–1802 William Gloag
1802–1814 John Thomson
1843–1874 Robert Nisbet
1875–1911 Alexander Williamson
1911–1913 John MacGilchrist
1913–1925 John Malcolm Munro
1925–1943 David Brown
1944–1965 James Maclennan Fullerton
1966–1972 John Macdonald Rose

Ministers of the collegiate charge:

1702–1732 Robert Sandilands
1732 William Hamilton
1733–1768 John Glen
1768–1786 James Brown
1786–1798 Thomas Hardy
1799–1801 George Husband Baird
1801–1820 David Dickson
1821–1825 Henry Grey
1825–1830 Robert Gordon
1830–1837 John Bruce
1837–1843 Charles John Brown

== Building ==
After John MacVicar Anderson decided in favour of Hardy & Wight's plan in 1881, a notice in Building News described the successful design as follows:

The style of the building which Mr Anderson recommends for adoption is Decorated Gothic of the middle period, with a tower and spire rising to a height of 160ft., the spire springing from a parapet with flying buttresses. The interior is spacious, and shows a nave, aisles, and transepts, the arcade resting upon polished columns of red granite. There is an open roof to the collar beam, 46ft. in height, with transept and end galleries seated for about 300 people, the entire accommodation being for 1,000 persons. Space is allowed for an organ in the apsis behind the pulpit. The church as designed will not cost more than £7,000.

The tower also incorporated a door in its base facing onto Argyle Park Terrace. A contemporary report in The Builder noted the design's quatrefoil parapet for the tower imitated the parapet of the tower of St Giles'. In addition to the spire, a flèche crowned the crest of the southern part of the roof. The south gable featured a large window with curvilinear tracery and was capped by a tall pinnacle. To the west of the south gable was a two-storey porch with a door giving access to the Meadows.

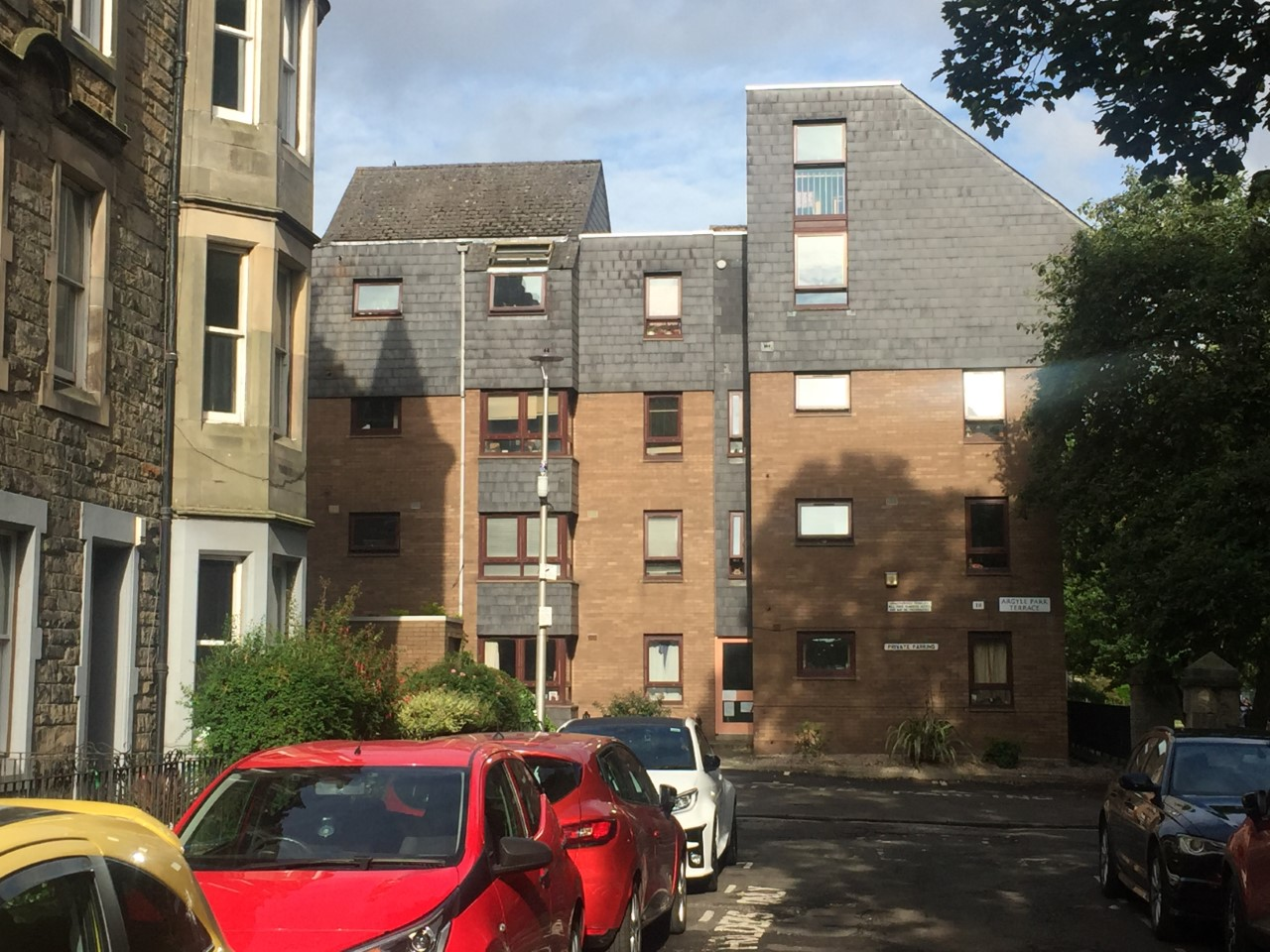
The Viewpoint care home constructed on the site of church

The galleries were located in the east and west transepts and at the north end of the nave. The organ accommodated in the apse was a two-manual instrument of 1889 by Eustace Ingram. In front of this stood a central canopied pulpit. A refurbishment took place in 1912, including the upgrading of the heating system, the replacement of the gas lights with electric, the overhaul of the organ, and the addition of a new vestry. In 1923, the congregation spent £2,000 to add a cloakroom and to move the organ and pulpit from the apse to the sides. There was a church hall to the south.

Stained glass was added to the west transept in 1898, to the north window in 1899, and to the east transept in 1912. In 1979, Marchmont St Giles' installed a glass screen to separate the nave from a new hall. This incorporates two windows from West St Giles': one depicting Saint Andrew and other in memory of the Second World War. Other features saved at the building's demolition include two stone rams' heads from the exterior, which were incorporated into the boundary wall of Hermits and Termits in St Leonard's.

=== Plate ===
Plate in possession of the church included three pewter flagons – one gifted by John Liberton in 1701 and the others gifted by John Weir in 1704 – as well as four large silver cups: one gifted in 1702 by William Archibald and the others gifted in 1704 by John Pringle, John Law, and John Cunninghame of Bandalloch. The silver baptismal basin was gifted in 1708 by Mary Erskine, founder and namesake of the girls' school.
