= Gowdie =

Gowdie is a surname. Notable people with the surname include:

- Isobel Gowdie (fl. 1660s), Scottish woman who confessed to witchcraft in 1662
- John Gowdie (1682–1762), Scottish academic and Church of Scotland minister

== See also ==
- European goldfinch
