= Charles John Brown (moderator) =

Scottish minister (1806–1884)

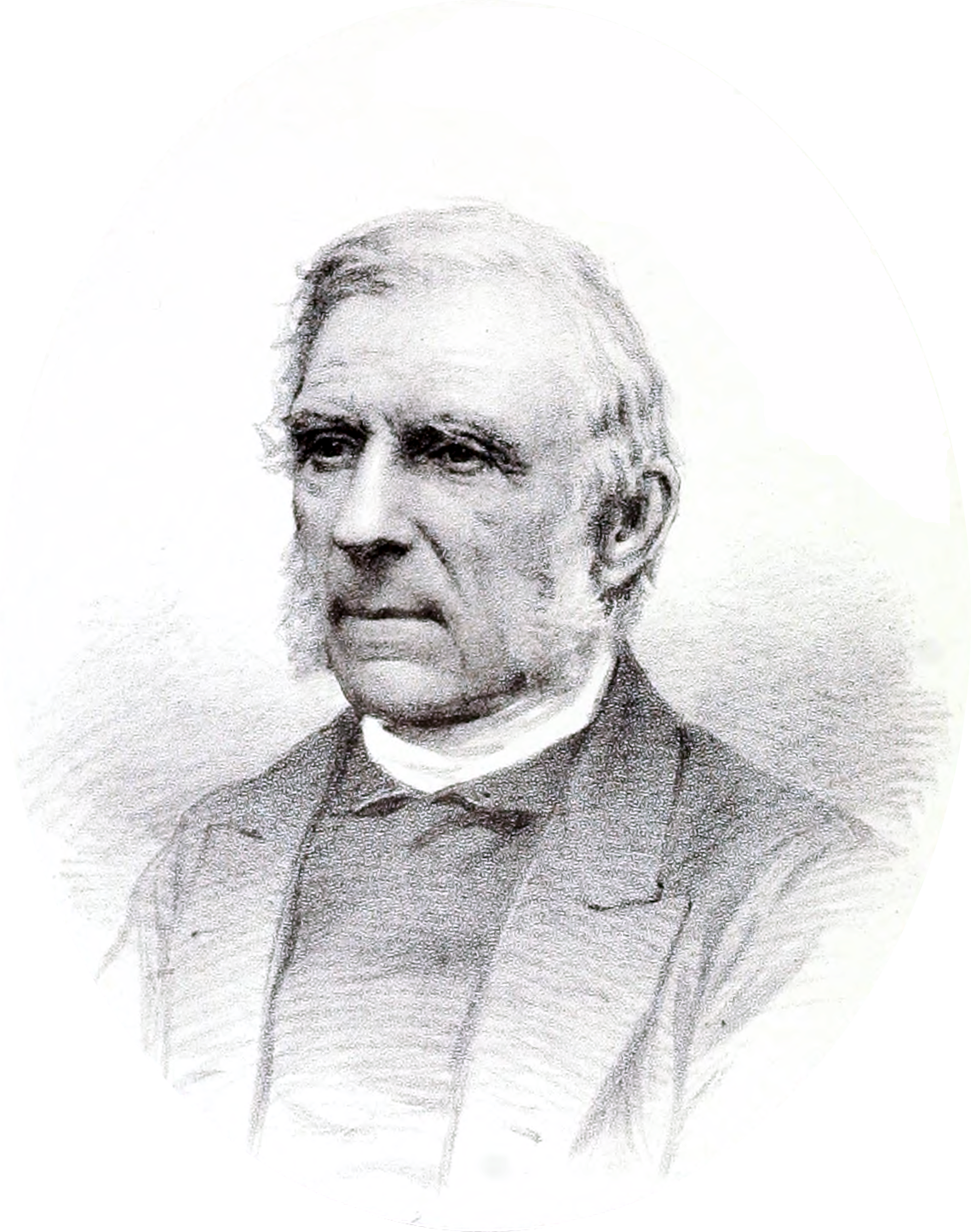
- Charles John Brown from Disruption Worthies

Personal details
- Born: 21 August 1806
- Died: 3 July 1884 (aged 77)

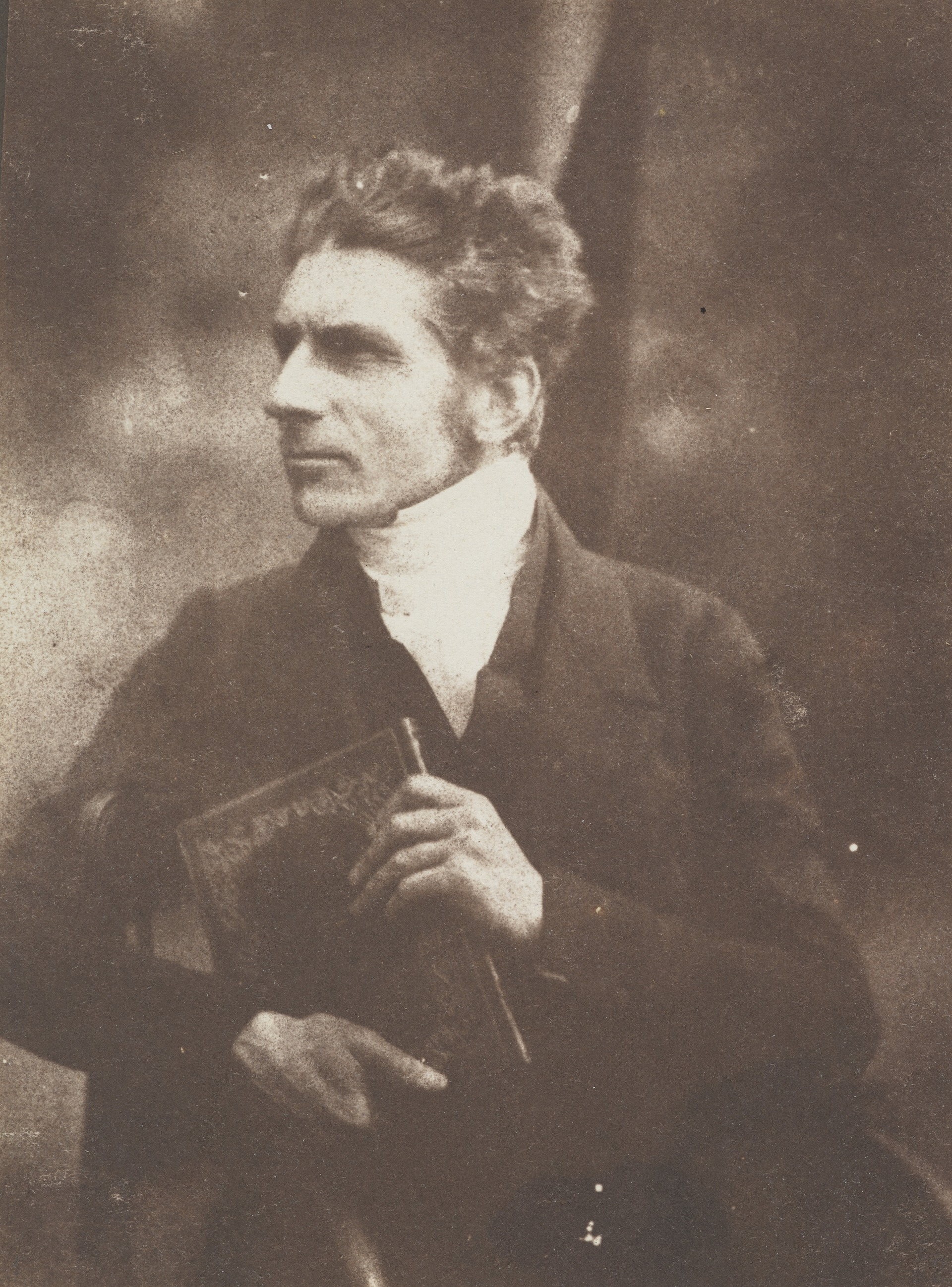
Charles John Brown by Hill & Adamson

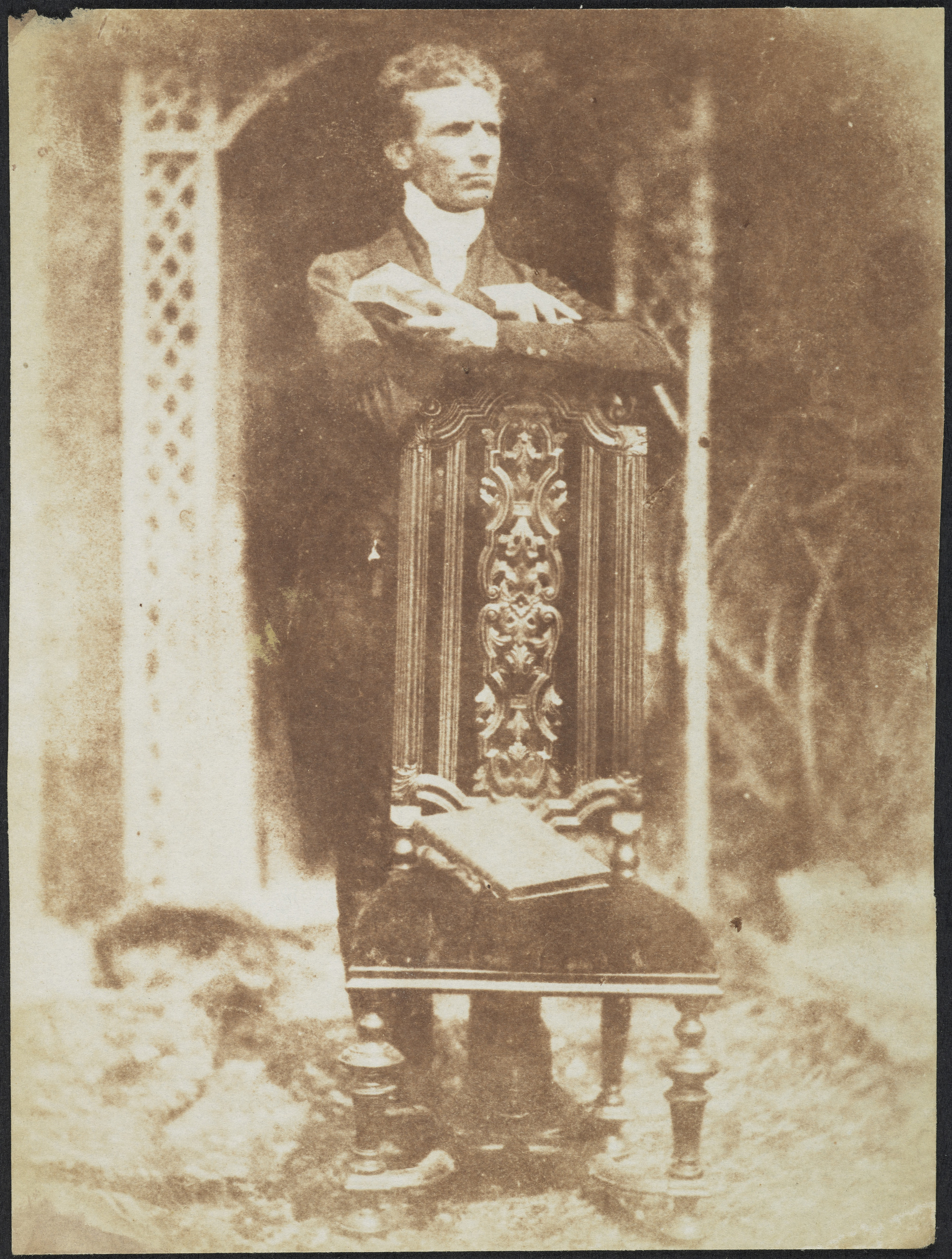
Charles John Brown

Charles John Brown (1806–1884) was a Scottish minister, who served as Moderator of the General Assembly for the Free Church of Scotland from 1872 to 1873.

== Life ==
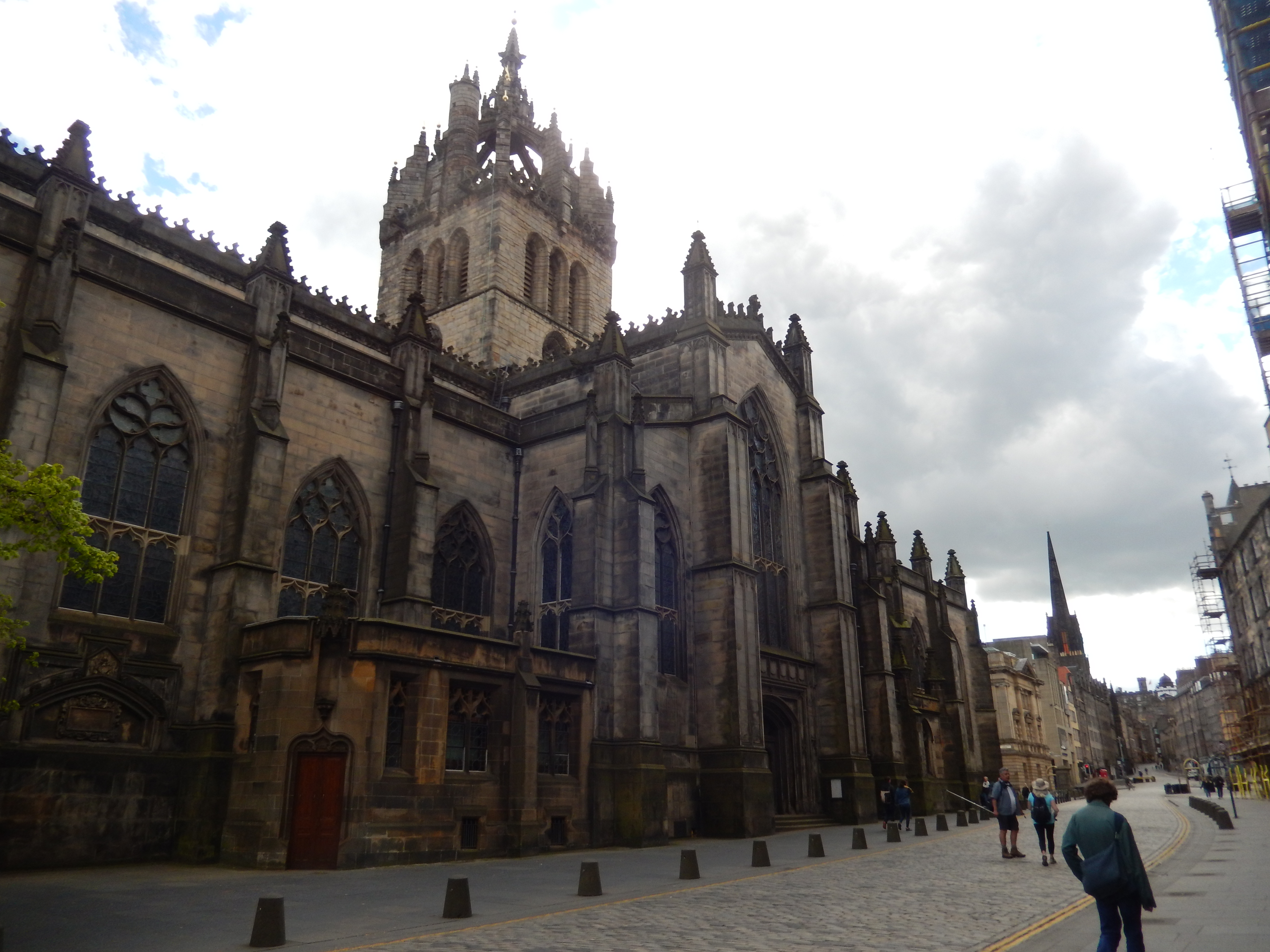
St. Giles' Cathedral

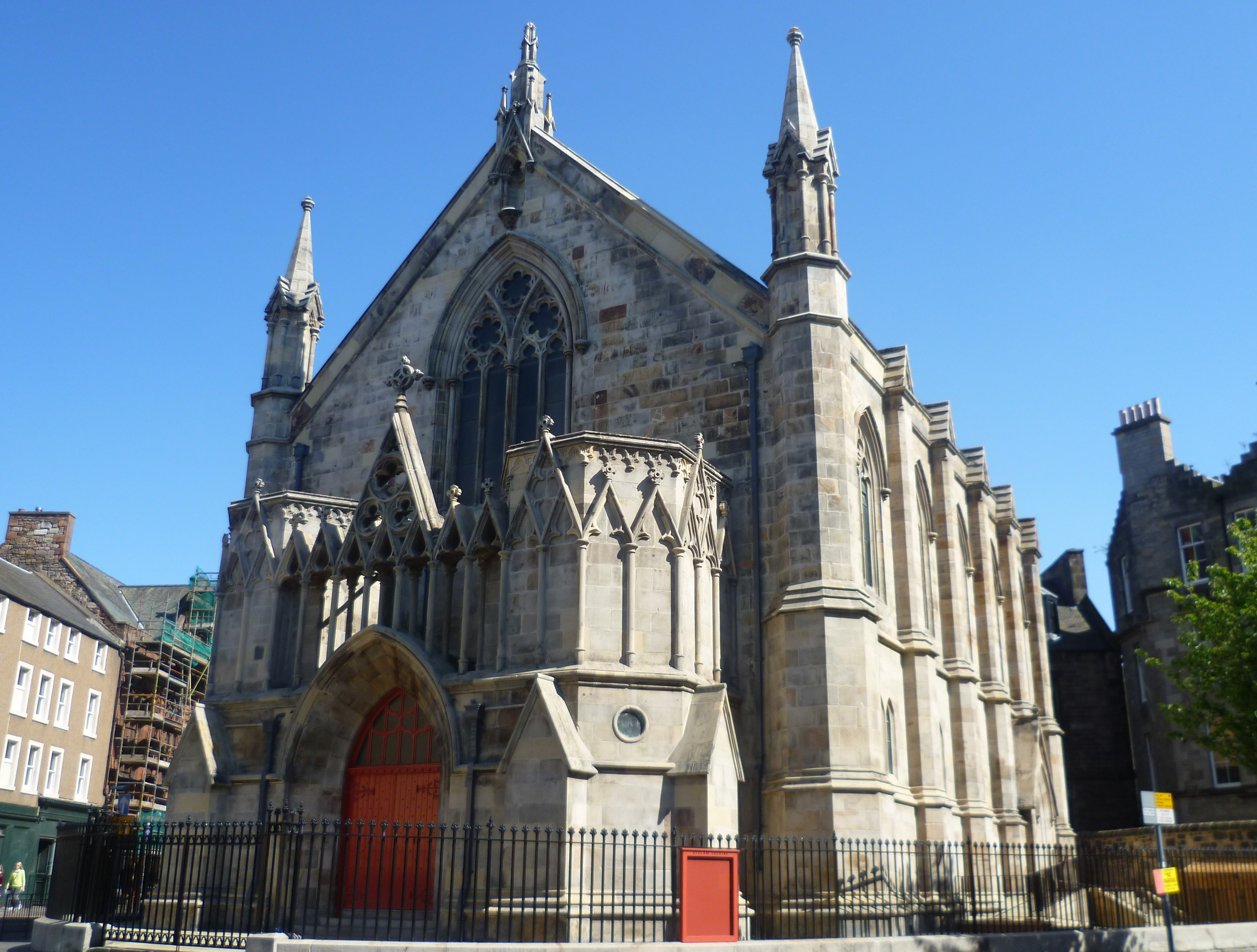
New North Free Church, Edinburgh, now the Bedlam Theatre

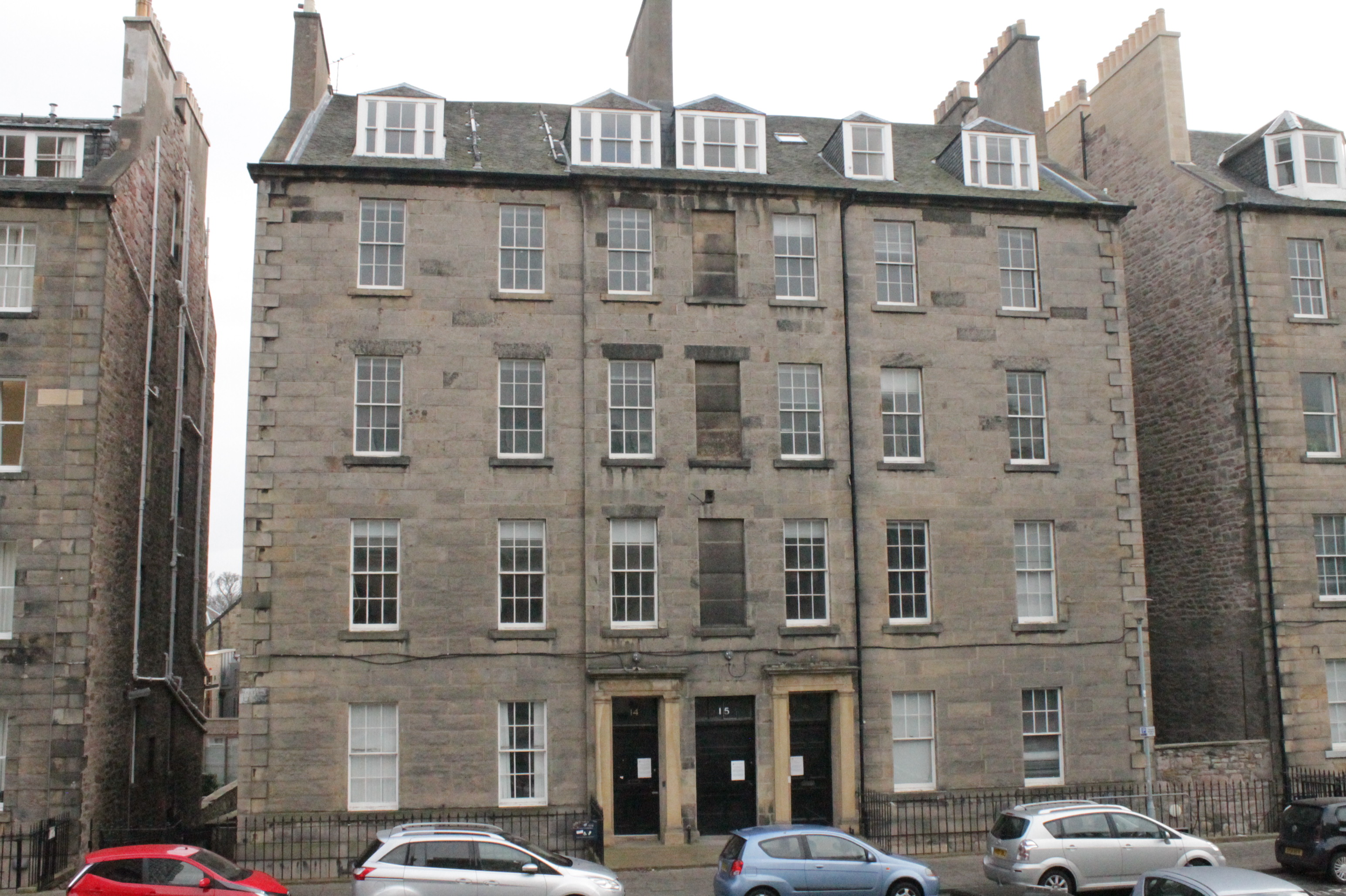
15 Buccleuch Place in Edinburgh

He was born in Aberdeen on 21 August 1806, the youngest of five sons of Alexander Brown, a bookseller and twice Lord Provost of Aberdeen, himself son of Rev William Brown of Craigdam. His mother was Catharine Chalmers. His older brothers included David Brown.

He studied at Marischal College and was licensed to preach by the Presbytery of Aberdeen in December 1830.

He was ordained at Anderston Church in Glasgow in 1831. He then lived at 272 St Vincent Street in Glasgow city centre. In 1837 he translated to the New (West), "New North" Church in Edinburgh, his position at Anderston being filled by Rev Alexander Neill Somerville.

In the Disruption of 1843 he left the established Church of Scotland to join the Free Church of Scotland. He then became minister of the New North Free church in Edinburgh, originally housed in Brighton Street Chapel then moving to a purpose built church at the junction of Forrest Road and Bristo Place. He then lived in a flat at 15 Buccleuch Place, near George Square, Edinburgh. The church was completed in 1849 and he remained there all his life. It was designed by Thomas Hamilton. It is now known as the Bedlam Theatre.

Princeton University awarded him an honorary Doctor of Divinity in 1863.

In 1872 he succeeded Rev Robert Elder as Moderator of the General Assembly.

He died on 3 July 1884.

== Artistic recognition ==
He was photographed by Hill & Adamson in 1843.

== Publications ==
- Church Establishments Defended with Special Referment to the Church of Scotland in Glasgow (1833)
- Rights of the Christian People in the Appointment of Their Ministers (1834) relating to the "Auchterarder Question"
- Lectures on Protestantism (1837)
- State of Religion in the Land (1844)
- Restraing of Spiritual Intercourse in Families (1855)
- The Divine Glory of Christ (1868)
- The Ministry: Addresses to Students of Divinity
- The Word of Life (1874)

== Family ==
He married 28 January 1834, Jane Bannatyne Wright, who died 12 November 1895, and had issue—

- Alexander, born 2 January 1835
- John Wright, born 19 December 1836, died 23 March 1863
- Margaret Lanes, born 28 September 1837, died 13 June 1853
- Catharine Chalmers, born 30 September 1838, died 28 February 1859
- Charles John, born 14 May 1841
- Ross, born 17 June 1845
- David, born 10 November 1846
- Andrew Howden, born 31 March 1848
- Robert Wright, born 14 August 1850
- Thomas Chalmers, born 10 May 1852, died 28 January 1853
- Jane Elizabeth, born 3 April 1855 Dyson Weston in London
