= William Wishart (secundus) =

Scottish clergyman

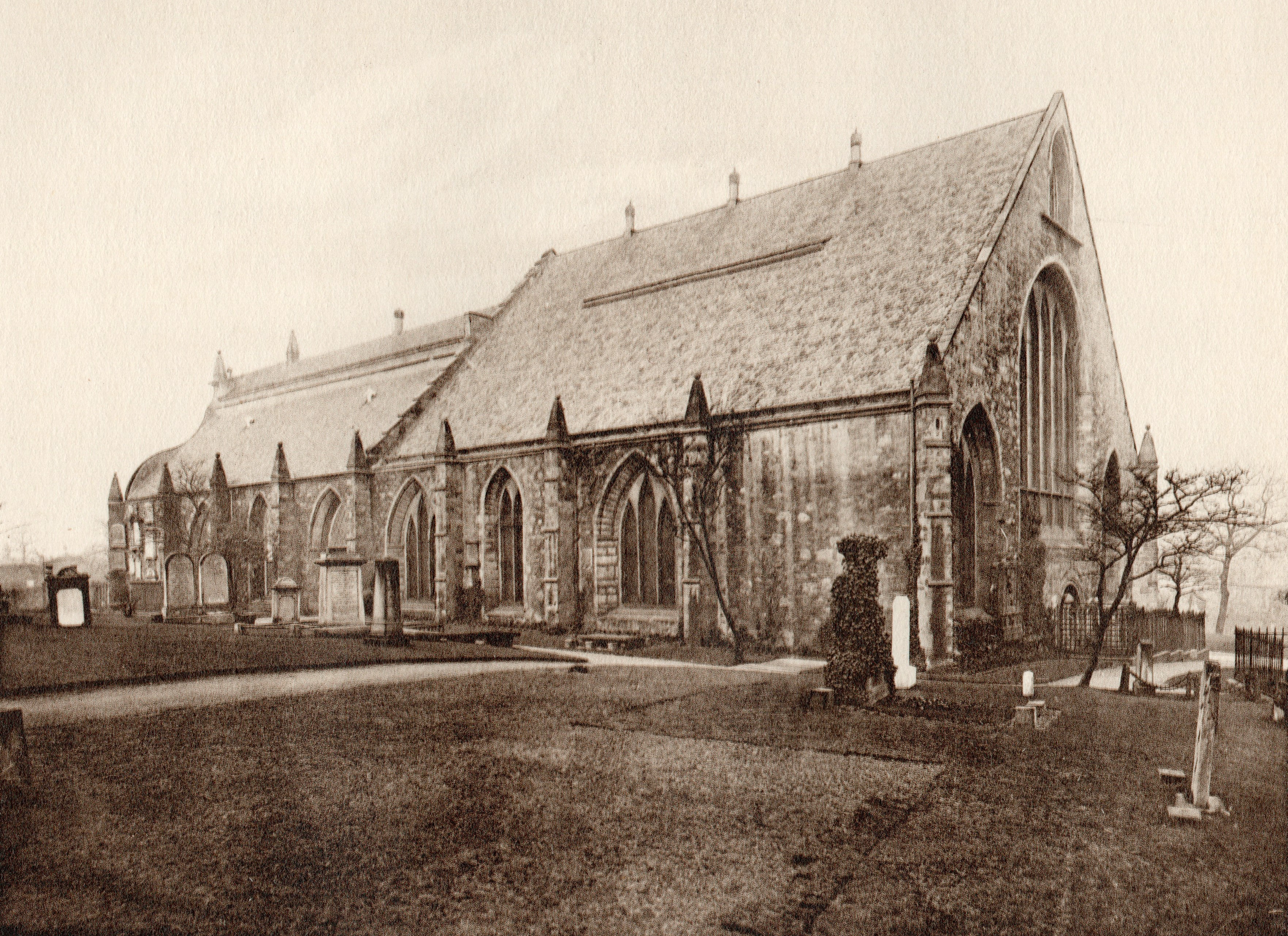
Greyfriars Kirk pre-restoration

William Wishart (secundus) (1691/92–1753) was a Scottish clergyman who served as the Principal of Edinburgh University from 1736 to 1753. He served as Moderator of the General Assembly for the Church of Scotland in 1745.

== Life ==
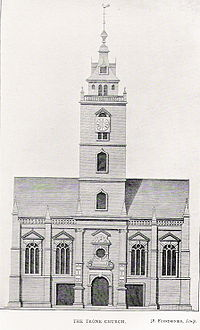
Engraving of the kirk as it looked before 1785

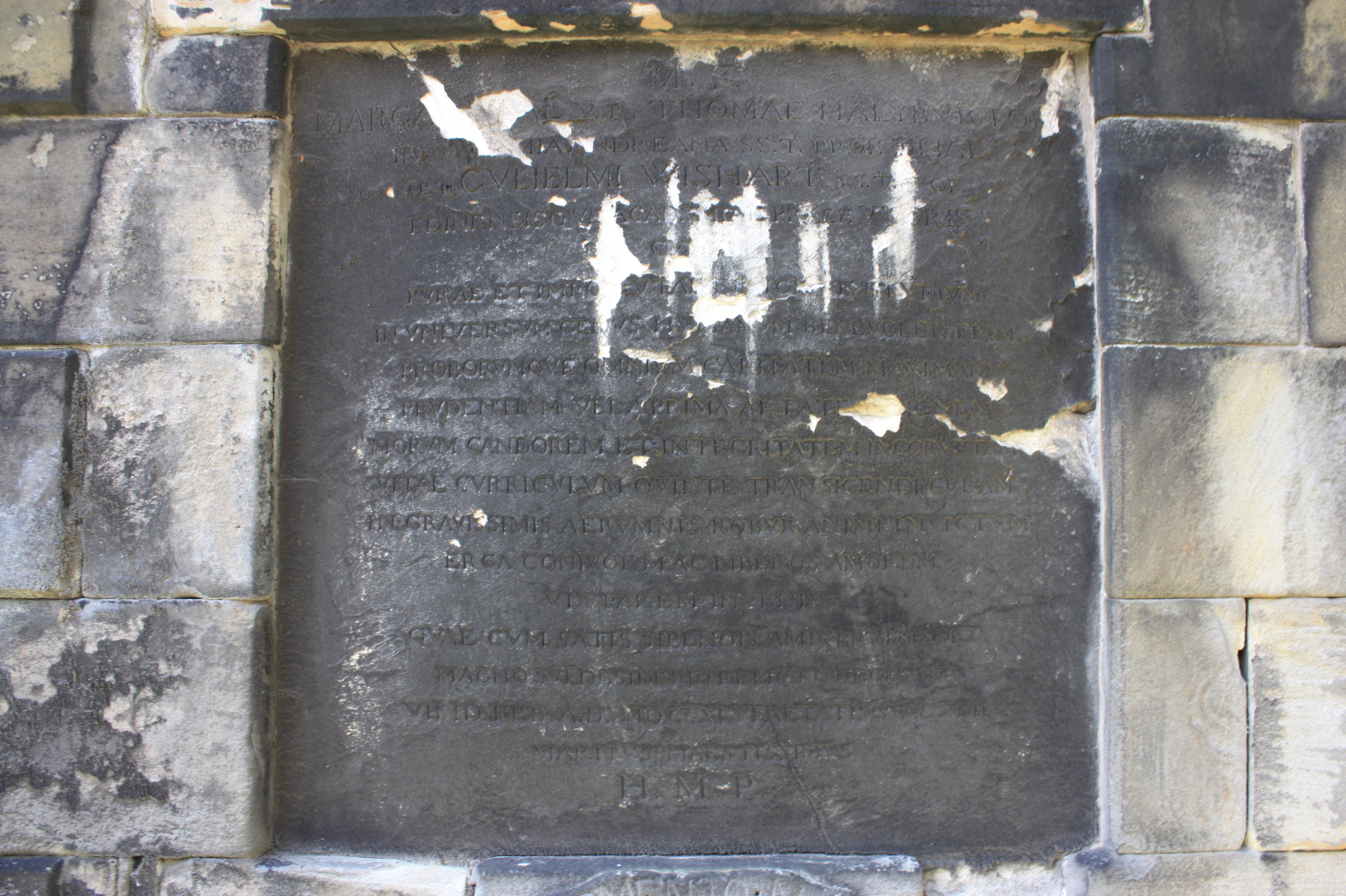
The grave of Rev William Wishart, Greyfriars Kirkyard (Covenanters Prison)

He was born in Leith the son of William Wishart where his father was minister of South Leith Parish Church. In 1707 his father became minister of Tron Kirk in central Edinburgh and the family moved to the Royal Mile. His father became Principal of Edinburgh University in 1716 and served that role until 1730.

Wishart studied divinity at Edinburgh University (prior to his father's principalship) and was ordained by the Church of Scotland as minister of the Scots Church (Founders Hall) in London around 1710.

In 1724 Wishart came into a large legacy from his uncle Admiral Sir James Wishart who was an Admiral of the White.

In 1737 he returned to Edinburgh in the dual role of Principal of Edinburgh University and minister of New Greyfriars (Greyfriars at that time being split into two halves in one building). In 1745 he translated to "second charge" of Tron Kirk in Edinburgh, under his younger brother Rev George Wishart, the church being around 500m to the north-east of Greyfriars. They are the only known first charge/second charge who were brothers.

He served as Moderator in 1745 following in the pattern of both his father and brother.

He died on 12 May 1753. He is buried with his father in Greyfriars Kirkyard.

== Family ==
In 1724 he married Margaret Halyburton daughter of Rev Prof Thomas Halyburton, Professor of Divinity at St Andrews University. They had 6 children: William Thomas Wishart (of Foxhall) (d.1799); a son who died in 1739; Ann (1737-1819); Janet, who married Mr Maxwell in Dundee; Margaret, who married James Macdowall an Edinburgh merchant; and Cordelia, who married Dr John Moncrieff MD of Rumgay.

Margaret died in 1746 and William married Frances Deans, daughter of James Deans of Woodhouselee. They had no children and after William died in 1754 she married John Scott of Stewartfield. On his death, she lastly married John Strother Ker of Littledean.

== Works and philosophy ==
- Charity: The End of Commandment (1731)
- Sermon for the Societies of Reformation of Manners in London (1732)
- Editor of Henry Scougal's Life of God in the Soul of Man (1739)
- Selected Sermons of Dr Benjamin Whichcote (1742)
- Ernesti's Preface to Cicero (1743)
- Public Virtue Recommended (1746)
- Volusenus de Animi Tranquillitate (1751)
- Discourses on Several Subjects (1753)
- Essay on the Indispenseable Necessity of a Holy and Good Life to the Happiness of Heaven (1753)

He is believed by most historians, to have written A Letter from a Gentleman (1745), an important criticism of David Hume.

He was a critic of George Berkeley and David Hume.

Apart from his defence of religious toleration and liberal political philosophy, Wishart's writings were heavily oriented toward general issues of moral philosophy.

== Notes ==
- M. A. Stewart, 'Wishart, William (1691/2–1753)', Oxford Dictionary of National Biography, Oxford University Press, 2004

Preceded by James Smith	Principals of Edinburgh University; 1736–1754	Succeeded by John Gowdie
