= Robert Nisbet (minister) =

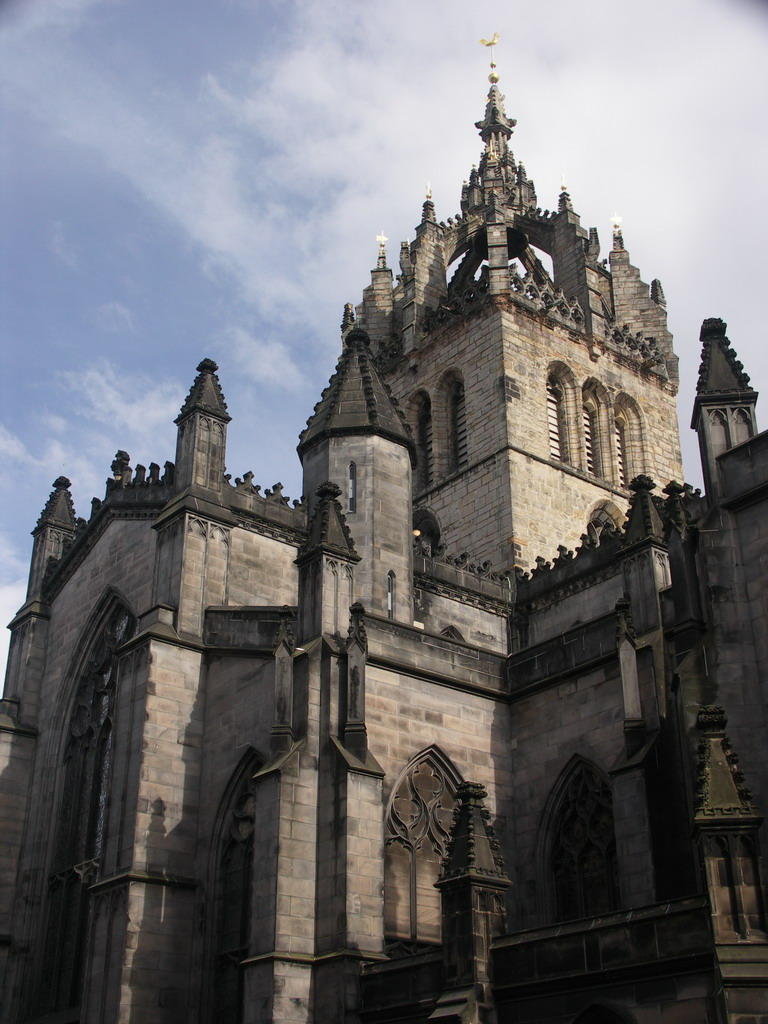
St Giles in Edinburgh

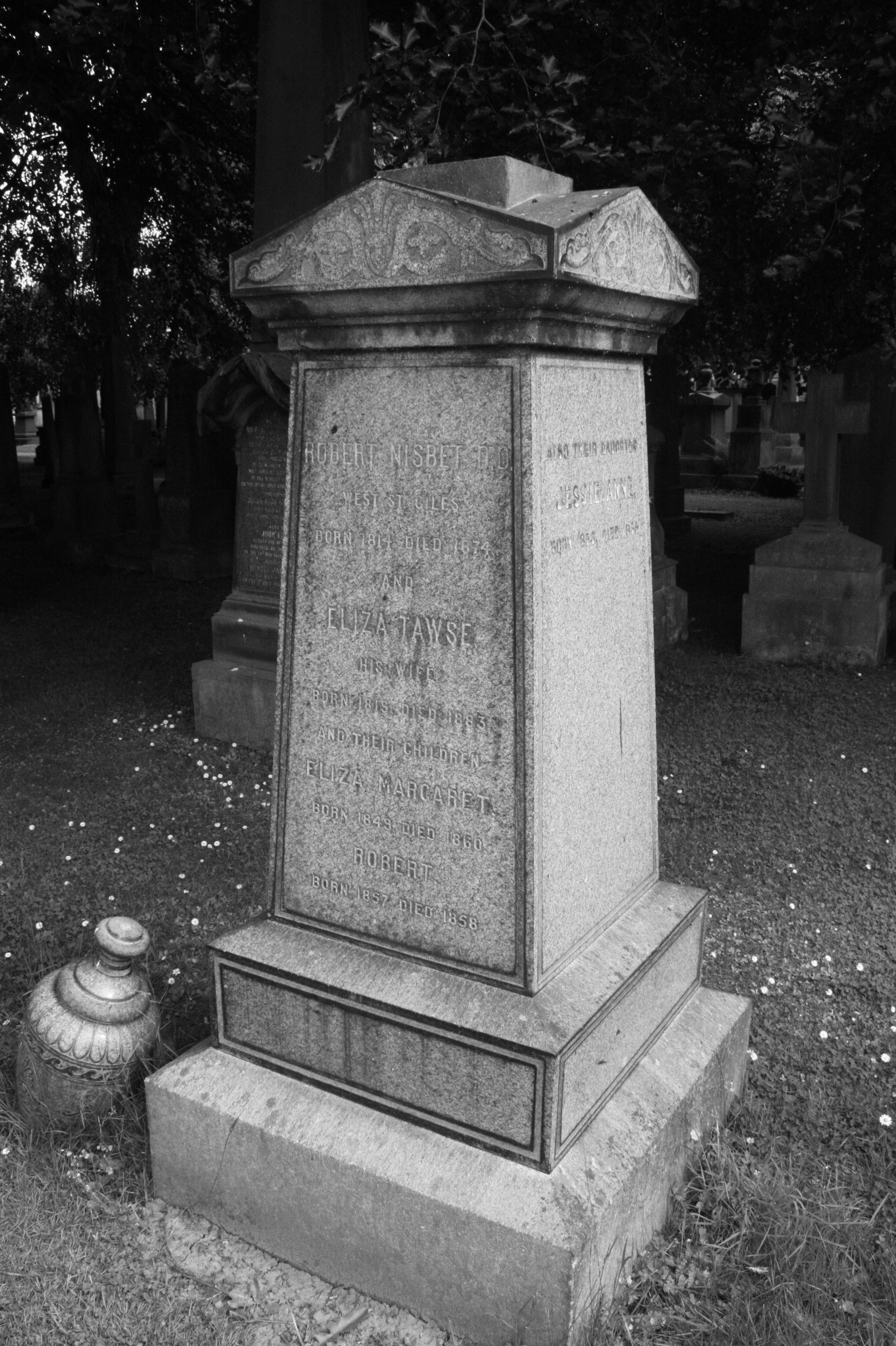
The grave of Nisbet, Dean Cemetery

Robert Nisbet FRSE (7 January 1814 – 22 November 1874) was a Scottish minister of the Church of Scotland and religious author.

== Life ==
He was born on 7 January 1814 in Auchterarder, the son of Margaret Sime, and her husband Christopher Nisbet. He was educated locally then studied divinity at the University of St Andrews and the University of Edinburgh. He was licensed to preach in 1836 and began as assistant minister in Lanark.

In 1842 he took on the prestigious role of minister of West St Giles' in Edinburgh.

In 1853 he was awarded an honorary doctorate (DD) from the University of St Andrews.

In 1863 he was elected a fellow of the Royal Society of Edinburgh, his proposer being Thomas Stevenson.

He died at his home, 56 Great King Street in Edinburgh's Second New Town on 22 November 1874. He is buried in Dean Cemetery in the west of the city, and his grave lies under the trees at the west end of the north-west section.

== Family ==
In 1848 he married Eliza Tawse (1818-1883) daughter of John Tawse of Stobshiel (1787-1861), an advocate living in Edinburgh. Their daughter Christian Nisbet married James Paisley son of Rev Robert Paisley DD of St Ninians in Leith, and their sons were Christopher Charles Nisbet WS (who inherited the Stobshiel estate), John Tawse Nisbet MD (1856–1909) and Robert James Nisbet (1859-1939).

He married 18 July 1848, Eliza (died 26 June 1883), daughter of John Tawse of Stobshiel, advocate, and had issue —

- Eliza Margaret, born 5 August 1849, died 18 May 1860
- Christopher Charles, of Stobshiel, Writer to the Signet, born 31 August 1851
- Jessie Anne, born 5 January 1853
- Christian, born 23 May 1854 (married James Paisley, son of Robert Paisley, D.D., St Ninians)
- John Tawse, M.D., born 12 March 1856, died 13 February 1909
- Robert, born 29 October 1857, died 22 July 1858
- Robert James, born 11 June 1859.

== Publications ==
- The Songs of the Temple Pilgrims (London, 1863)
- Studies on the Epistle of Paul to Philemon (Edinburgh, 1876, posthumous)
- Youthful Builders Instructed, sermon preached before the Governors of George Heriot's Hospital
- Sermon (preached under the auspices of the S.P.C.K.).
