= Thomas Hardy (minister) =

Scottish minister

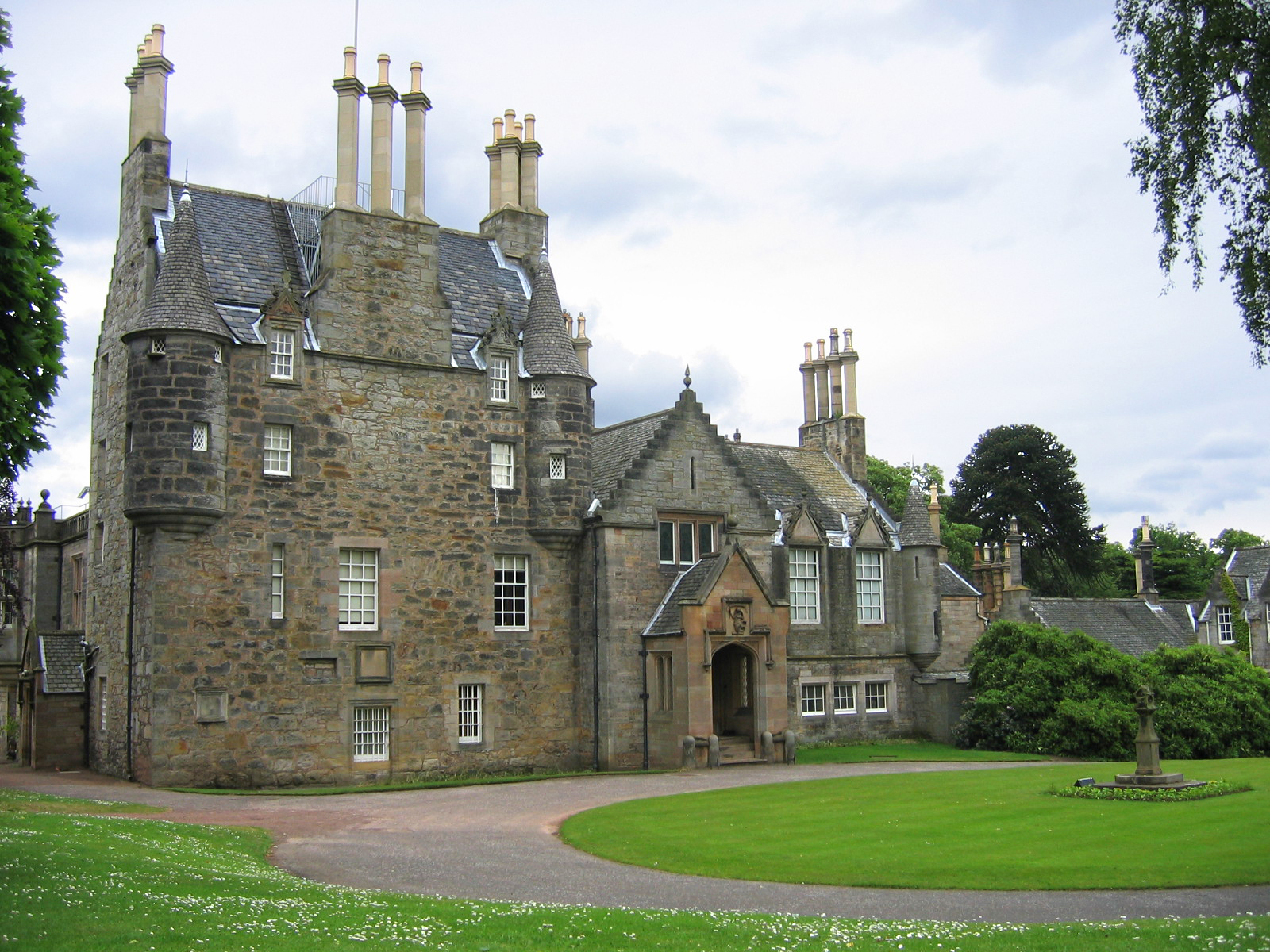
Lauriston Castle

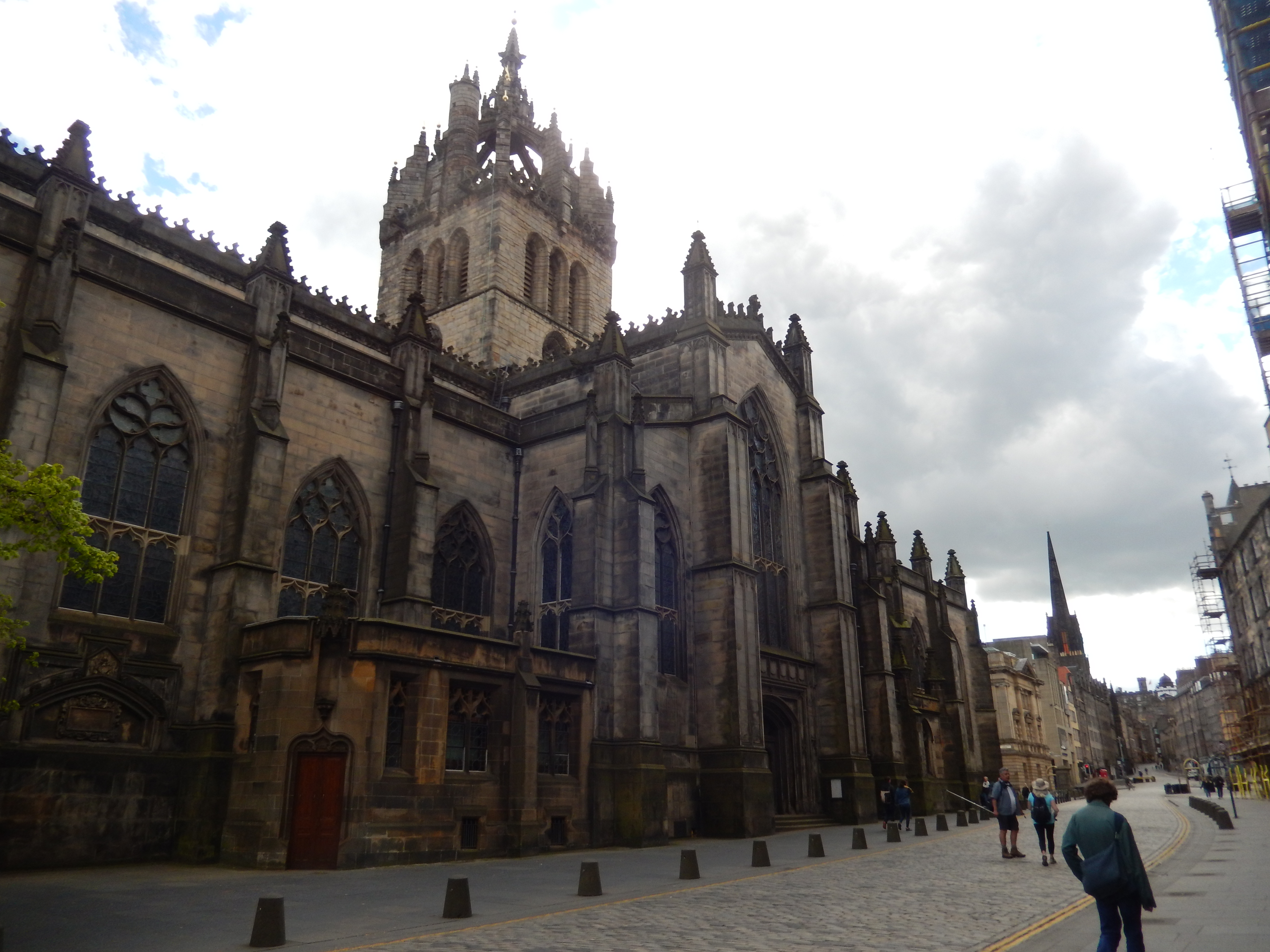
St. Giles' Cathedral

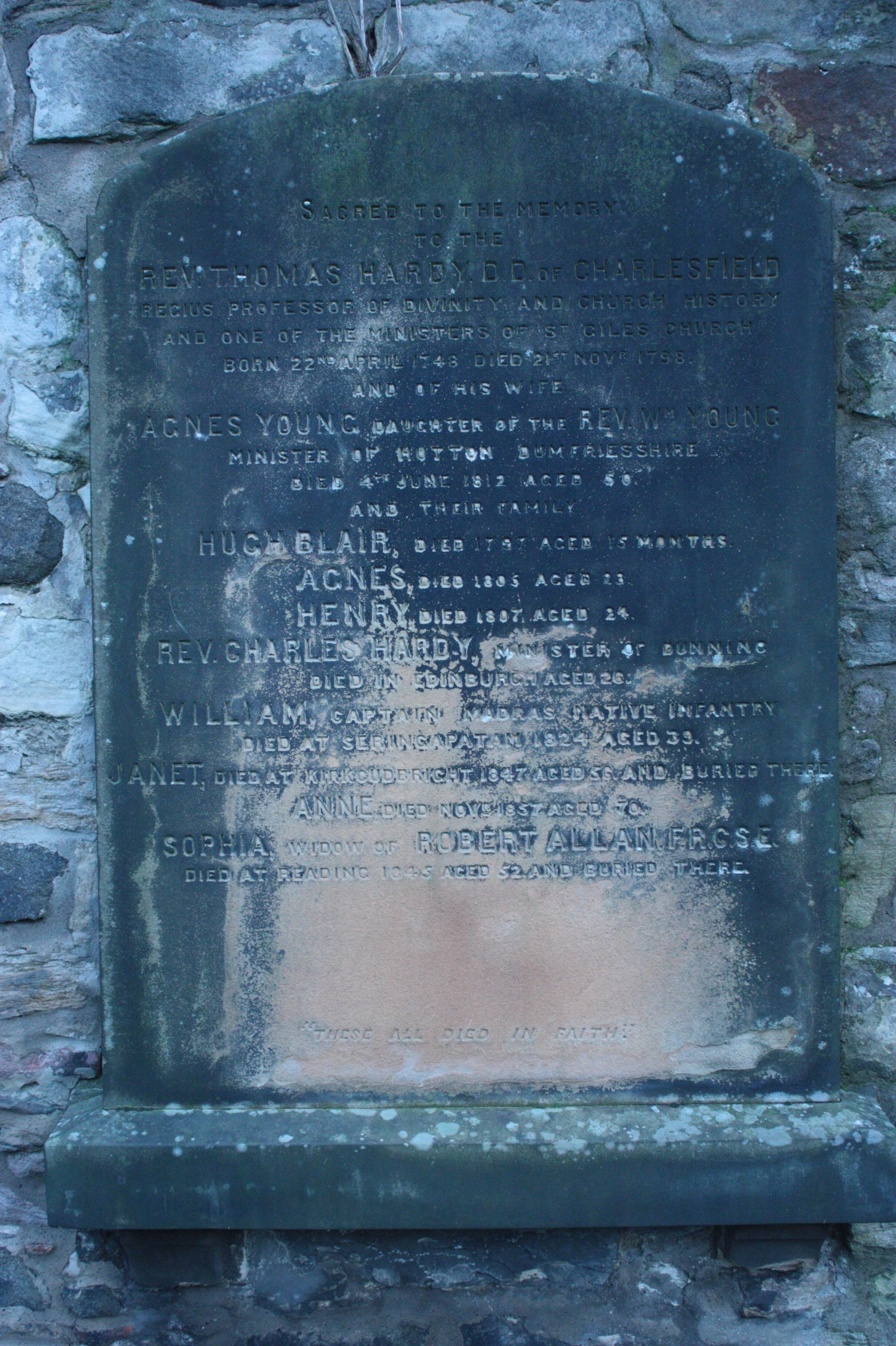
The grave of Hardy, Canongate Kirkyard, Edinburgh

Thomas Hardy (occasionally Thomas Hardie) FRSE (22 April 1748 – 21 November 1798) was a Scottish Minister, Moderator of the General Assembly of the Church of Scotland in 1793 and Professor of Ecclesiastical History at Edinburgh University. He was also Dean of the Chapel Royal and Chaplain in Ordinary to the King.

He was better known for his political and social activities than his scholarship, though he was a popular and eloquent preacher. His academic lectures, it is said, were often met with applause. He was an enthusiastic supporter of the British Government during the troubled times of the French Revolution, as was natural to one whose career had benefited from the patronage of Henry Dundas. He published nothing on Church History, his academic subject, but some of his sermons survive as do pamphlets on Moderation in Religion (meaning support for the established order), the evils of the slave trade, the need for increased stipends for Ministers as well as polemics against the writings of the radical Thomas Paine.

== Life ==
He was born in 1748 in Navitie House in Ballingry, Fife, the son of Rev Henry Hardy, the minister of Culross, and his wife Ann Halkerston.

After studying at Edinburgh University he was licensed to preach by the Presbytery of Kirkcaldy on 16 September 1772. He was presented to the Parish of Ballingry by its patron Sir Michael Malcolm and ordained there on 16 June 1774. Edinburgh University awarded him an honorary doctorate (DD) in 1778.

He was translated to the High Kirk parish, St Giles in Edinburgh in 1784, and then to one of the four other parishes still contained in St Giles Cathedral: New (West) St Giles in 1786. He lived at Lauriston Castle on the outskirts of the city, near Cramond.

The influence of Henry Dundas secured him the Professorship of Ecclesiastical History at Edinburgh University, a post he held in conjunction with his Minister's position. He was awarded a Doctor of Divinity by the University on 4 October 1788 and was in the same year made Professor of Ecclesiastical History at the university.

He was elected Moderator of the General Assembly of the Church of Scotland for the year 1793, which sent a loyal letter to the King "to express our zeal for the welfare of our country, and our affectionate regard for a Prince, who is the guardian of liberty, and the father of his people" and promised him, in typical Moderate fashion, that "we (i.e. the Church) shall continue to cherish in the minds of the people loyalty to our gracious Sovereign, veneration for the British constitution, and obedience to the laws". They finished by calling upon "the god of battles" to bring speedy victory to the King's forces.. In October same year, he became Chaplain in Ordinary to the King and Dean of the Chapel Royal. He was one of the founders of the Society for the Benefit of the Sons of the Clergy of the Church of Scotland in Edinburgh.

In 1795 he was elected a Fellow of the Royal Society of Edinburgh. His proposers were John Rotherham, James Gregory and Rev James Finlayson.

On the death of his father he acquired estates at Navitie (Fife) and Charlesfield in Livingston. In 1795, a house was built at Charlesfield and the house and estate would later pass to his two sons. In Edinburgh he lived at Richmond Place in the South Side.

He died on 21 November 1798. He is buried with his wife and children in the south-east corner of Canongate Kirkyard on Edinburgh's Royal Mile. His grandchildren, including Henry Hardy lie to their side.

== Family ==
In June 1780 he married Agnes Young (d.1812), daughter of Rev William Young, the minister of Hutton. They had five sons and four daughters, many of whom, died young, others pursuing careers (or marriages) related to the Church, the law, medicine and the military, including:

- Captain William Hardy HEICS (1785-1824)
- Rev Charles Wilkie Hardy, minister of Dunning
- Thomas Hardy FRCS (1794-1836) surgeon.

== Publications ==
- Views which Revelation exhibiteth of the general history of man, considered. A discourse, preached before his Grace, Charles Lord Cathcart, 4 June. 1775.
- Principles of moderation. Addressed to the clergy of the popular interest in the Church of Scotland, 1782
- Benevolence of the Christian spirit, a sermon, preached in the Tron Church of Edinburgh, 31 May. 1791. before the Society for the Benefit of the Sons of the Clergy of the Church of Scotland. To which is added an account of the objects 1791
- Addressed to the people, on the present state of affairs in Britain and in France. With observations on republican government, and disscussions [sic] of the principles advanced in the writings of Thomas Paine 1793
- Progress of the Christian religion. A sermon, preached before the Society in Scotland for propagating Christian Knowledge, at their anniversary meeting in the High Church of Edinburgh, Thursday, 30 May 1793, 1794
- Fidelity to the British constitution, the duty and interest of the people. A sermon, preached in the New North Church, Edinburgh, on Thursday, 27 February. 1794, being the day appointed by His Majesty for a general fast. 1794
- Importance of religion to national prosperity. A sermon, preached in the High Church of Edinburgh, 15 May. 1794, at the opening of the General Assembly of the Church of Scotland, 1794

== Sources ==
- Emerson, Roger L Academic patronage in the Scottish enlightenment: Glasgow, Edinburgh and St Andrews Universities Edinburgh University Press 2007
- Scott, Hew Fasti Ecclesiae Scoticanae, The succession of Scottish ministers in the Church of Scotland from the Reformation Volume I & II Edinburgh 1915
- Cooper, James (1890). "Hardy, Thomas (1748-1798)" . In Stephen, Leslie; Lee, Sidney (eds.). Dictionary of National Biography. Vol. 24. London: Smith, Elder & Co.

== See also ==
- List of moderators of the General Assembly of the Church of Scotland

Church of Scotland titles
Preceded by Andrew Hunter	Moderator of the General Assembly of the Church of Scotland; 1793	Succeeded by Robert Arnot
