= James Brown (moderator) =

James Brown (1724–1786) was a Church of Scotland minister who served as Moderator of the General Assembly in 1777.

== Life ==
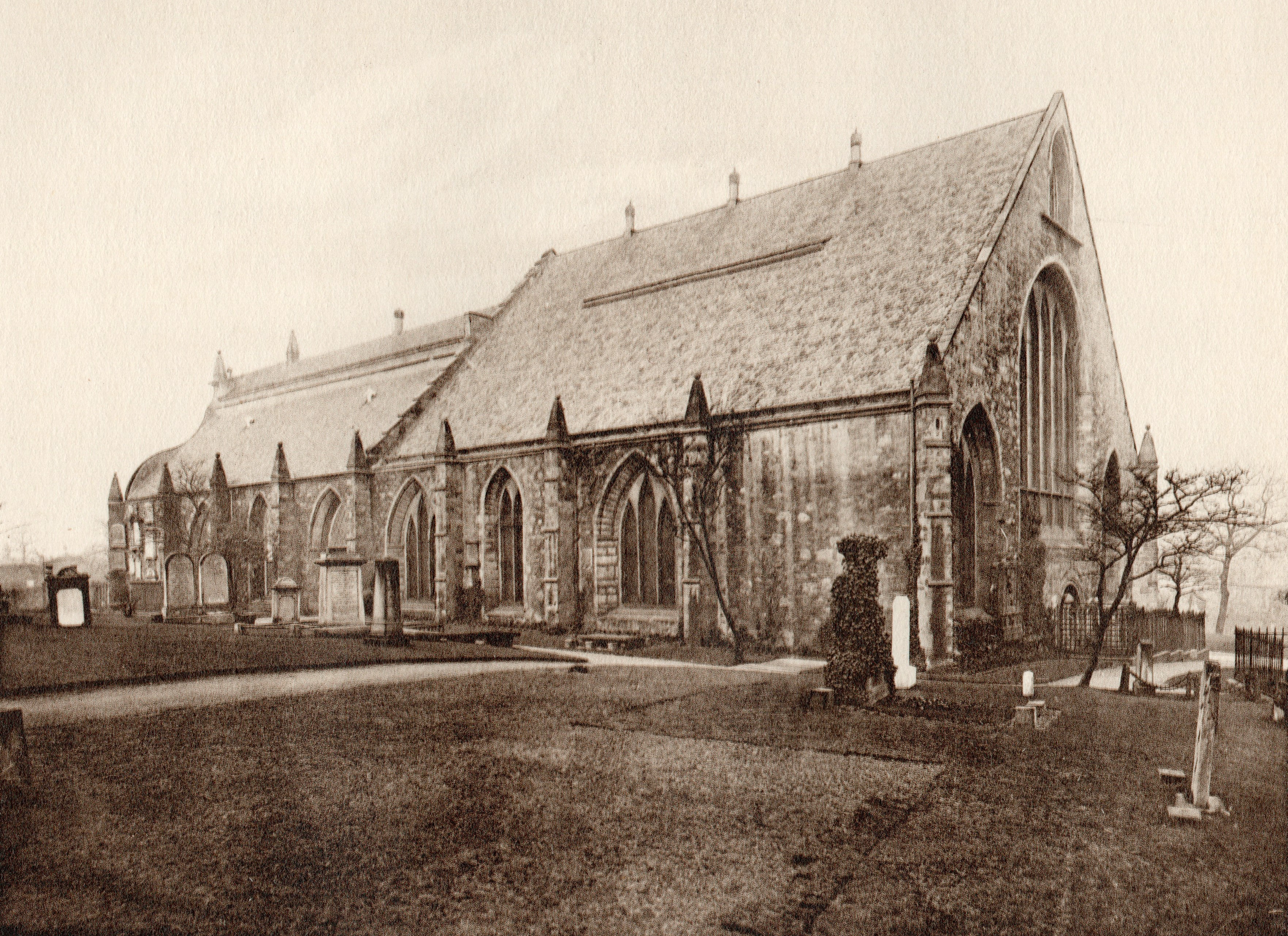
Old and New Greyfriars

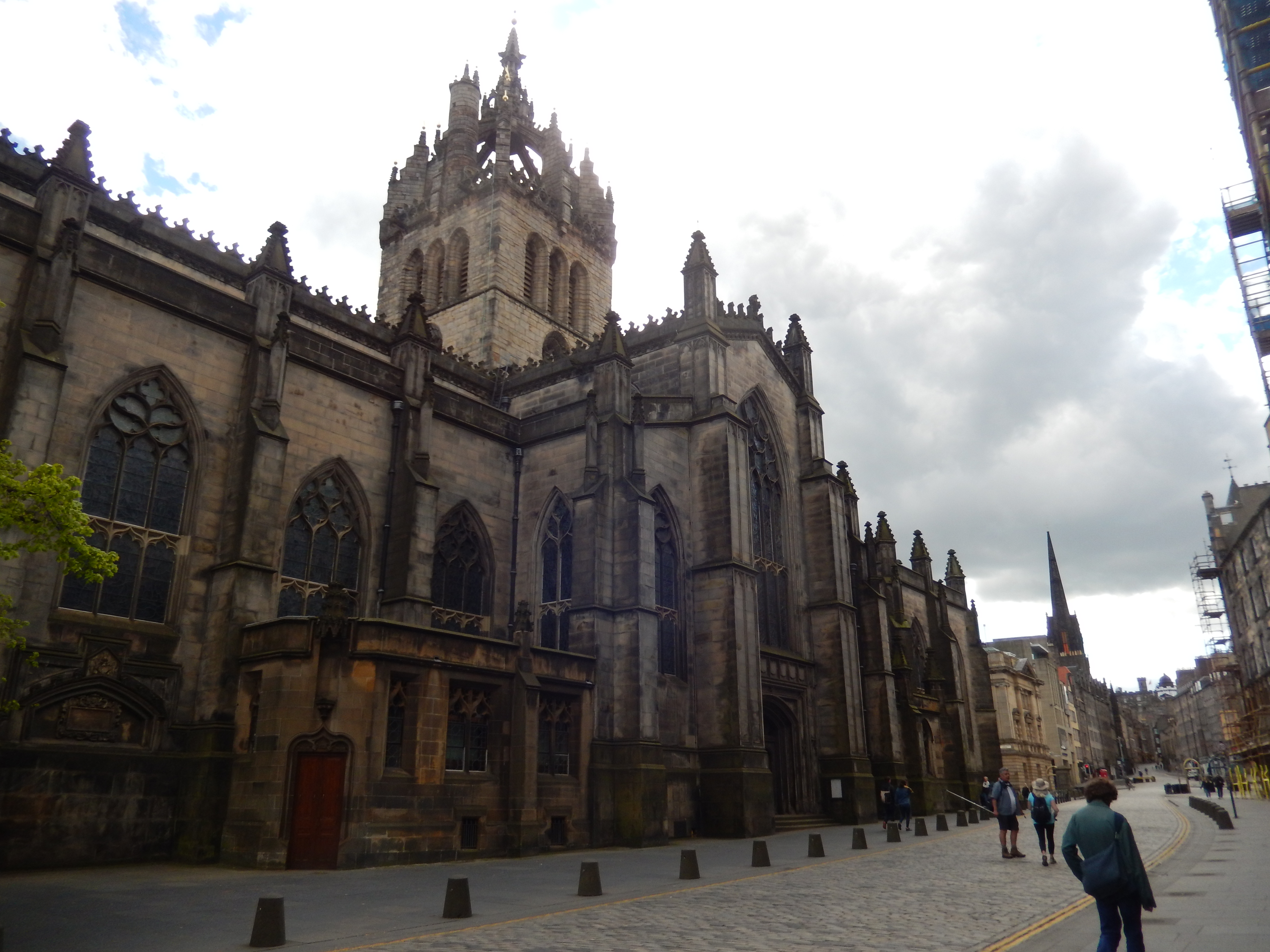
St. Giles' Cathedral

He was baptised on 17 December 1724 the youngest son of Rev James Brown of Abercorn. He studied at the University of Edinburgh, graduating MA in 1742. He was licensed to preach by the Presbytery of Perth in July 1745.

He was ordained as minister of Melrose Parish Church in February 1748. In 1767 he translated to New Greyfriars in Edinburgh in place of Rev John Erskine. In November 1768 he moved to New (West) Kirk, St Giles on the Royal Mile in Edinburgh.

He was elected Moderator of the General Assembly of the Church of Scotland in 1777 in place of Rev John Ker of Forfar.

In 1785 he is listed as living at "Laurieston": the district close to George Heriot's School south of the town centre.

He died on 6 May 1786.

== Family ==
In June 1748 he married Helen Drummond (died 1754) third daughter of Captain Lawrence Drummond. Their children included:

- John (1749–1757)
- Katharine (1750–1752)
- Elizabeth (1751–1764)
- Helen (born 1754) married John Pattison, advocate

Helen died a month after giving birth to Helen. In November 1755 Brown married Marion Tod (died 1786), daughter of Robert Tod, an Edinburgh merchant. Their children included:

- Janet (1756–1759)
- Margaret (1757–1768)
- Robert Brown of Kirklands WS (1758–1812) apprenticed to his in-law Thomas Tod
- Rev James Brown, minister of Newburn (possibly the twin of Robert)
- John (1761–1767)
- Thomas (1766–1801) Edinburgh merchant
- Marion Brown (born 1771) married John Gray of Newholm WS

== Publications ==
- The Extensive Influence of Religious Knowledge (1769)
- Plan for Regulating the Charity Workhouse
