= John Gowdie =

Scottish academic and minister

John Gowdie (1682–1762) was a Scottish academic and Church of Scotland minister. He was Moderator of the General Assembly of the Church of Scotland in 1733.

== Life ==
He was born in Jedburgh the son of John Gowdie, a schoolteacher, and his wife Agnes Aberneathy. He was educated at his fathers school then attended Edinburgh University where he graduated MA in 1700. He was licensed to preach by the Presbytery of Jedburgh.

From 1704 to 1730 he was minister of Earlston in the Scottish Borders. He was then minister of Lady Yester's Kirk in Edinburgh from 1730 to 1732 and then translated to the New (West) Kirk in Edinburgh, one of the four parishes within the subdivided St Giles in December 1732.

In 1733, he was appointed Moderator of the General Assembly of the Church of Scotland in succession to Rev Neil Campbell.

Late in 1733 he left the New Kirk to take the role of Professor of Divinity at Edinburgh University. He was awarded an honorary Doctor of Divinity in 1759. He was the Principal of the University of Edinburgh (in place of James Smith from 1754 until death in 1762.

He died in Edinburgh on 19 February 1762 and was buried in Greyfriars Churchyard.

== Family ==
In 1706 he married Jean Deas (d.1736) with whom he had a son and a daughter. In 1743 he married Ann Ker (d.1764) and had one child.

His daughter by Jean, Elizabeth Gowdie, married Rev John Hill of St Andrews and were parents to John Hill.

His son John Gowdie followed in his father's and grandfather's footsteps as minister of Earlston.

== Notes ==
Preceded by William Wishart (secundus)	Principals of the University of Edinburgh; 1754–1762	Succeeded by William Robertson
