= John Bruce (minister) =

Scottish minister

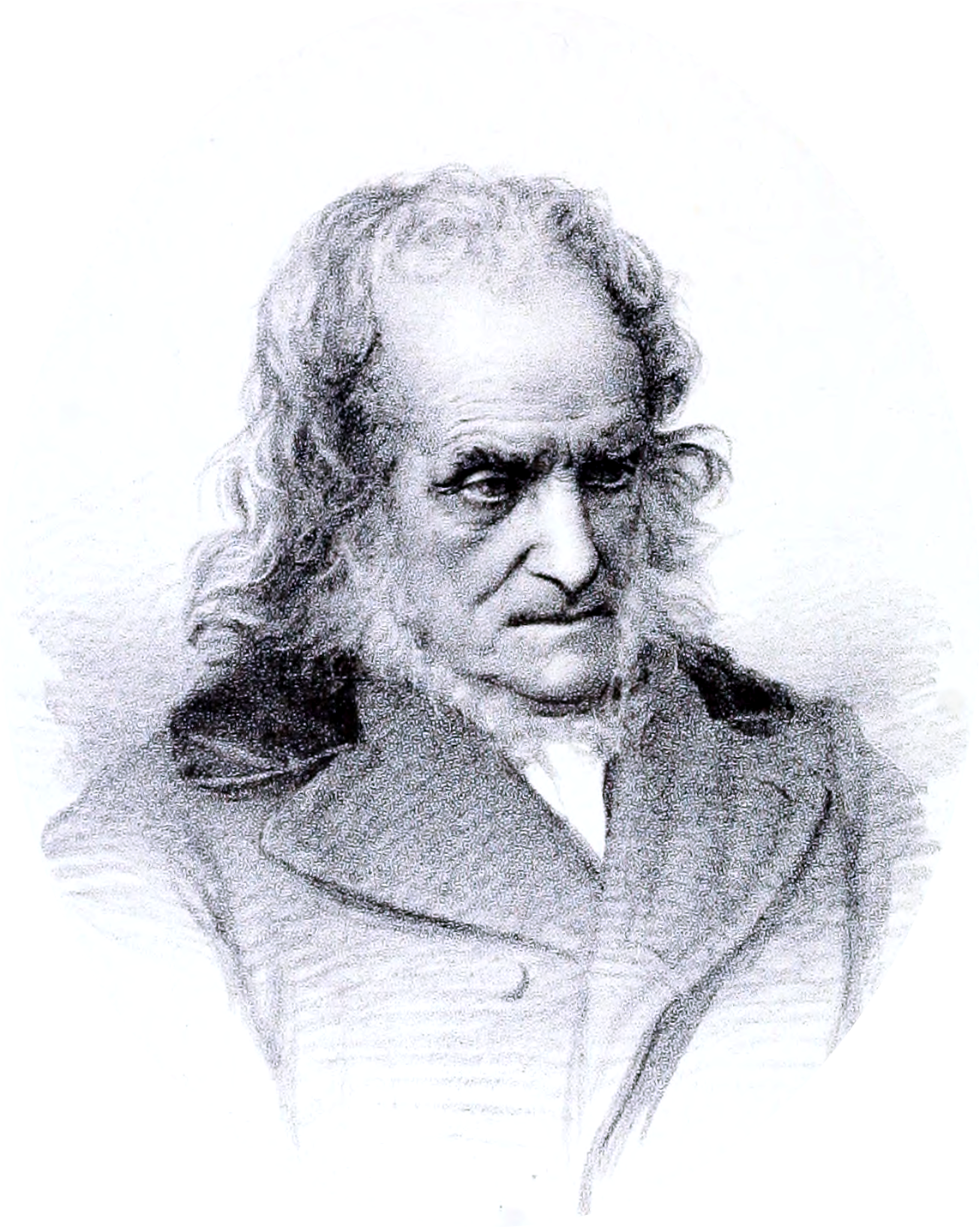
- John Bruce from Disruption Worthies
- Church: Church of Scotland, Free Church of Scotland

Personal details
- Born: 30 November 1794 Forfar, Scotland
- Died: 4 August 1880 (aged 85) Edinburgh, Scotland
- Education: Marischal College, University of St Andrews

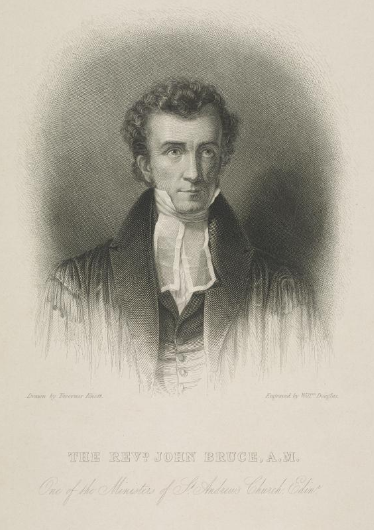
Rev John Bruce c.1840

John Bruce (30 November 1794 – 4 August 1880) was a senior Scottish minister in the 19th century who held positions in the Church of Scotland and Free Church of Scotland.

== Life ==
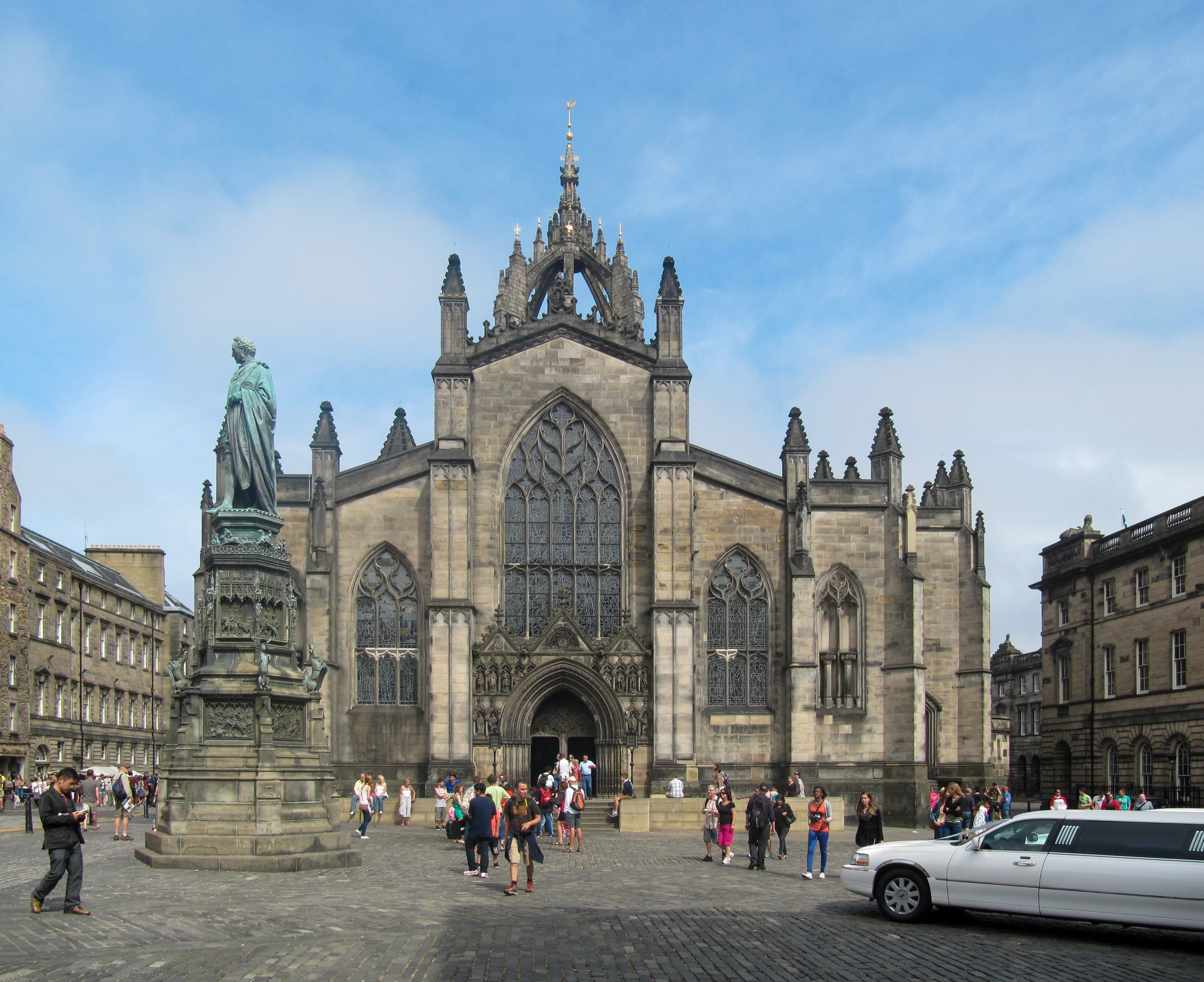
St Giles Cathedral, which housed the New North parish in Edinburgh

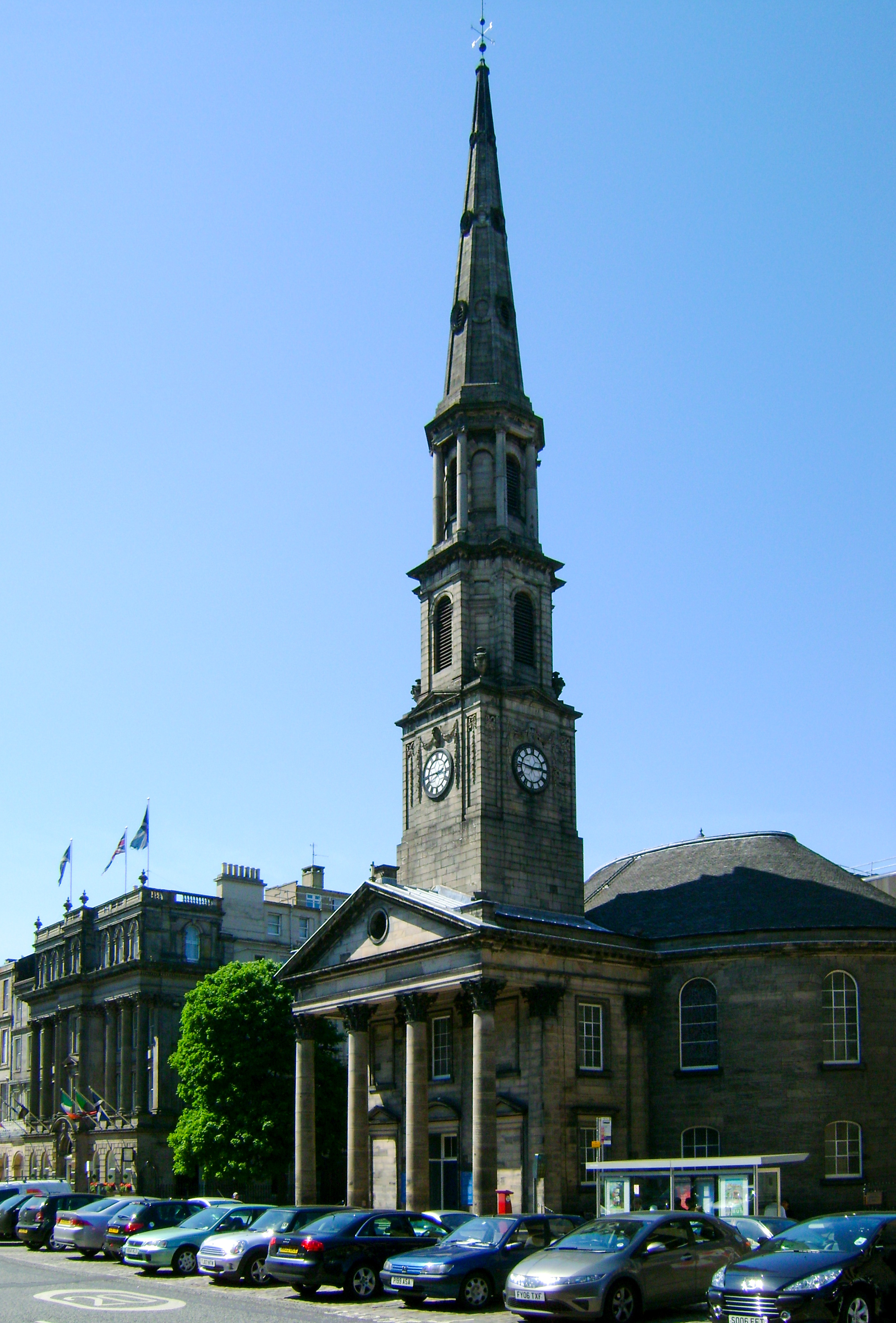
St Andrew's Church in Edinburgh

He was born in the manse at Forfar on 30 November 1794 the son of John Bruce, minister of Forfar, and his wife Mary Fergusson (died 1844). He was schooled at Forfar then attended Marischal College in Aberdeen gaining an MA in 1812. He studied divinity at the University of St Andrews. He was licensed to preach by the Presbytery of Forfar in April 1817.

In September 1818 he was ordained as minister of Guthrie Parish Church, a small and remote rural charge. In 1831 he translated to the New North Church in Edinburgh a very busy urban church, and a great contrast to Guthrie. It was one of the four parish churches contained within St Giles Cathedral; New North occupying the western quarter. Bruce then lived at 43 Lauriston Place, south of the church by 1 kilometre (0.62 mi). In 1837 he replaced Andrew Grant as minister of St Andrews Church on George Street in the New Town. The significance of this move is now less visible, as moving from the city cathedral to an outer parish now looks like a negative step. However, in the 1830s a New Town location represented a far more affluent congregation, than the largely poor congregation still inhabiting the Old Town. Whilst serving St Andrews he lived at 4 Queen Street a large Georgian townhouse immediately north of the church.

In the Disruption of 1843 Bruce left the established Church of Scotland and joined the Free Church of Scotland. Taking a substantial number of wealthy congregation members with him they built the new St Andrews Free Church a short distance westward at 80 George Street. This was fronted by (and accessed through) the pre-existing Georgian townhouse, with the new structure (accommodating 1400) wholly contained within the rear garden).

Bruce at this time lived at 24 Saxe Coburg Place in the Stockbridge district.

His alma mater gave him an honorary Doctor of Divinity (DD) in 1855.

He was assisted by Lewis Ferguson from 1871 due to growing frailty (Bruce was then aged 77). He died at Humbie near Kirkliston on 4 August 1880 aged 85. He is buried in the churchyard of St Cuthberts Church in Edinburgh. The grave is located in the central section, south of the church, on the south wall with a backdrop of Edinburgh Castle.

Bruce's successor at St Andrews Free Church organised for a new bespoke church at Drumsheugh Gardens and abandoned the George Street premises, which was soon demolished and rebuilt. The Drumsheugh Gardens Church (by Campbell Douglas) was demolished in turn in 1957 and is now an office block.

== Family ==
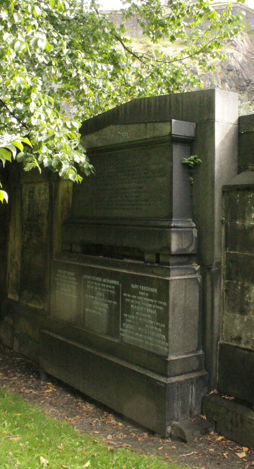
The grave of Rev John Bruce, St Cuthbert's Churchyard

In May 1836, he married Marjory Ramsay (1798–1841) daughter of George Ramsay, a banker who resided at 133 Princes Street. Marjory died in 1841 and their only daughter Margaret Maxtone Bruce (1838–1843) died in infancy.

He remarried in September 1845 to Susan Stedman Abercrombie (1809-1857), the daughter of Dr John Abercrombie. Their first daughter Agnes died after a few days in 1846. Their second daughter, also Agnes, was born in 1848.

== Publications ==
- The Moral Discipline of Divine Providence (1813)
- Lecture on Civil Establishments of Religion (1835)
- A Testimony and Remonstrance Regarding the Moderatorship (1837)
- The Duty and Privilege of Keeping the Sabbath (1842)
- The Biography of Samson (1854)
- The Revivals of the Church (1859)
- The Great Disruption Principle (1859)
- The Life of Gideon (1870)
- Our Dread and Strange Bereavements: On the Death of the Prince Consort and Dr Cunningham
- Sermons with a Sketch of the Life of Rev James Chalmers Burns (1882, posthumous)
