= Henry Hardy (architect) =

Scottish architect (1830–1908)

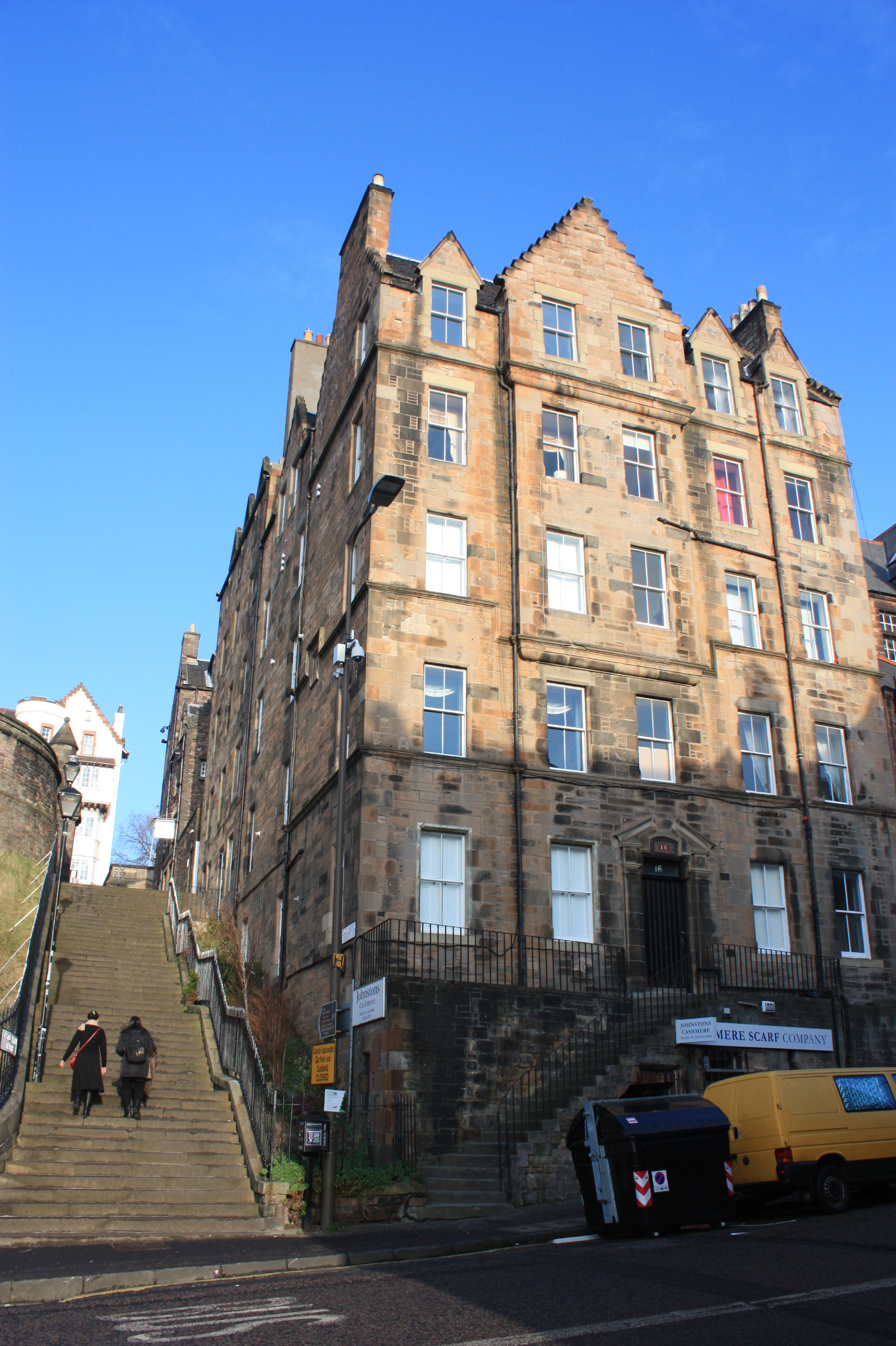
Johnston Terrace and Castle Wynd Steps, Edinburgh - part of the City Improvement Scheme by Henry Hardy

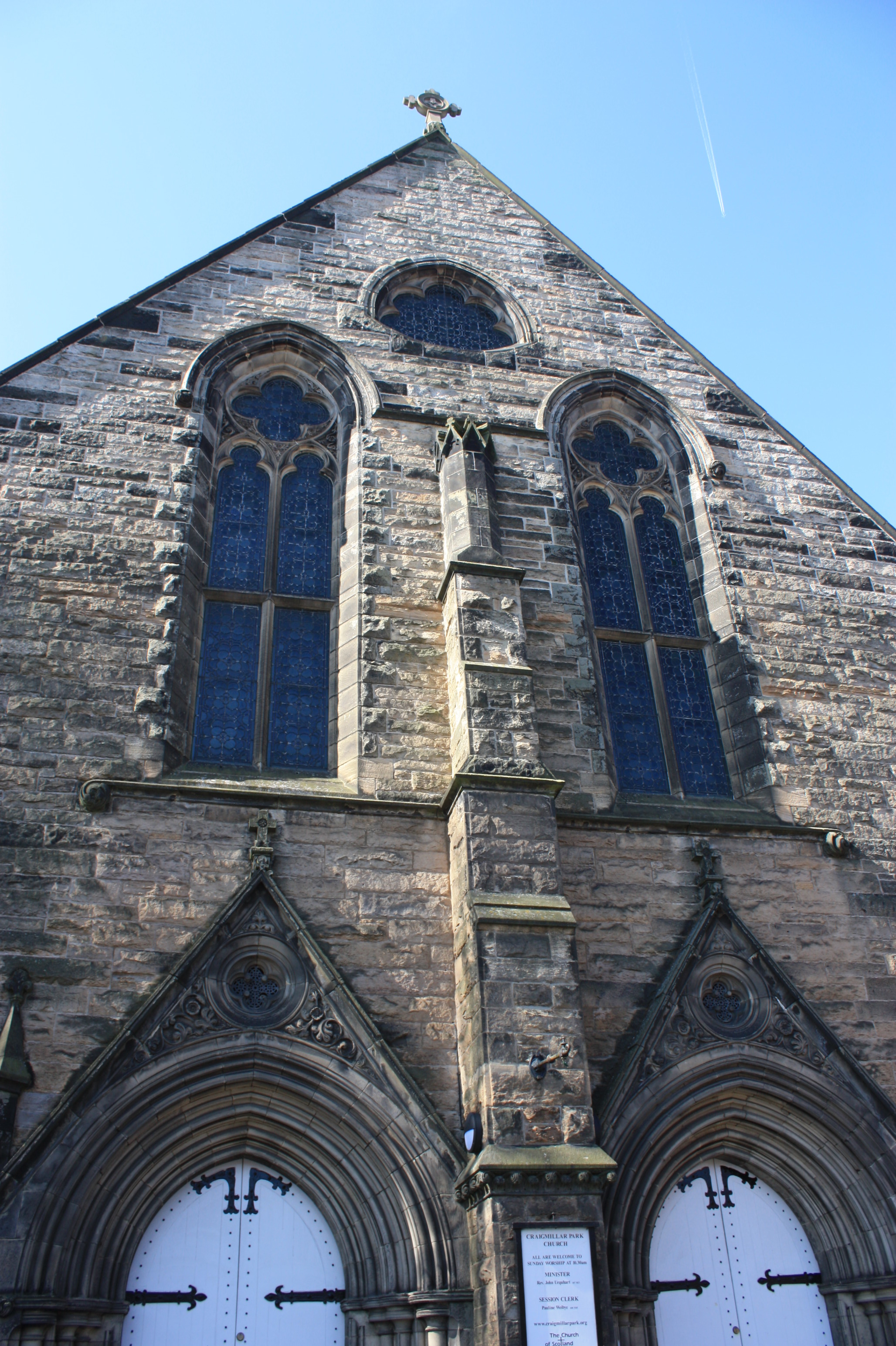
Craigmillar Park Church, Edinburgh by Hardy and Wight (detail)

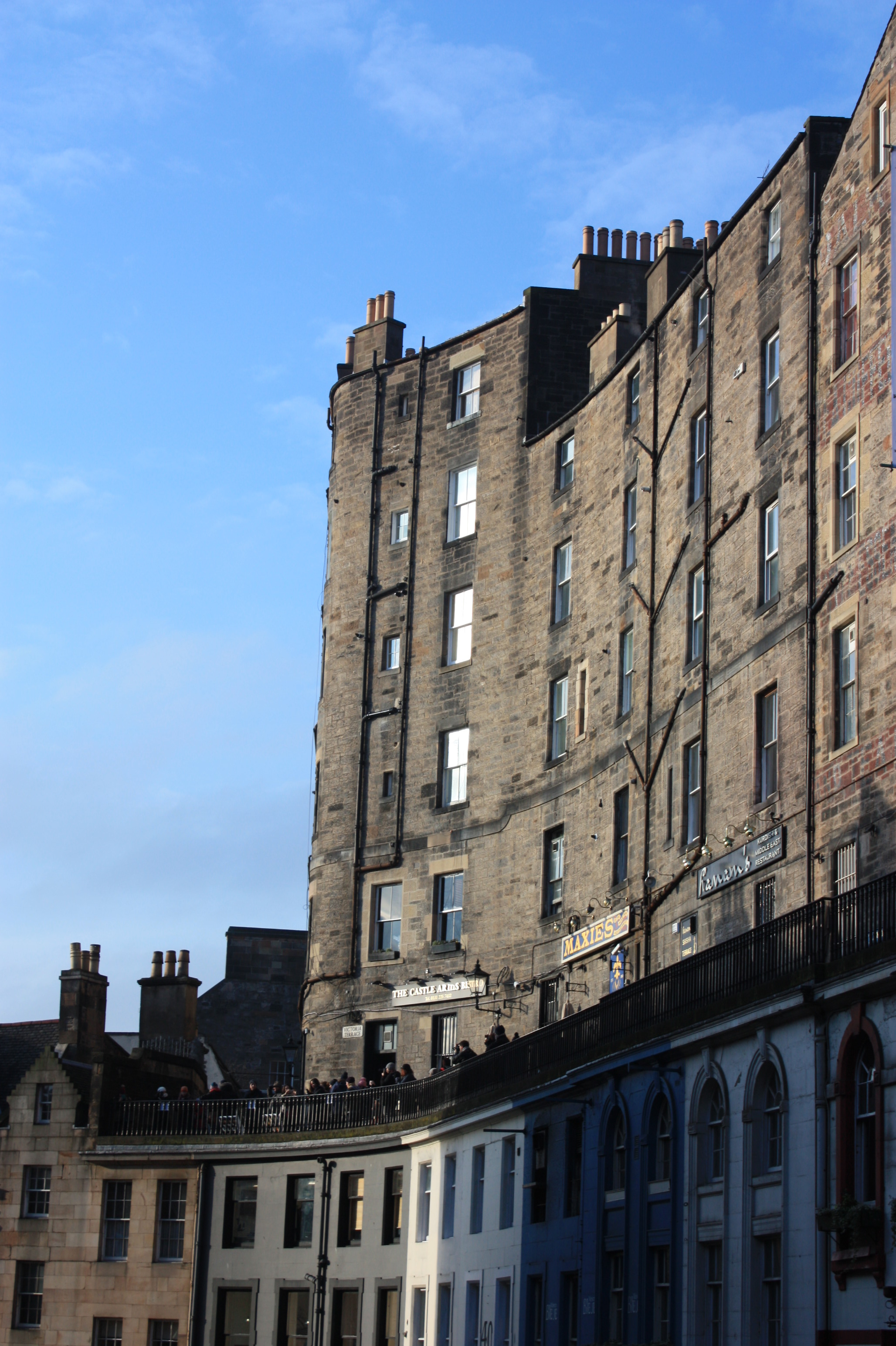
The dramatic rear of Johnston Terrace (by Henry Hardy) as seen from Victoria Street, Edinburgh

Henry Hardy (2 February 1830 – 4 December 1908) was a Scottish architect operational in the late 19th century and principal partner of the firm Hardy & Wight. He was also a member of the Royal Scottish Academy as an accomplished landscape artist. He was involved in various City Improvement Schemes in Edinburgh including George IV Bridge and Johnston Terrace and also specialised in church design.

== Life ==
He was born in Edinburgh in 1830 the son of Thomas Hardy of Charlesfield, FRCSE, and Robina Forrester. He was the grandson of Prof Rev Thomas Hardy (1748-1798).

Originally a junior partner of Smith & Hardy architects he became the principal partner of Hardy & Wight in 1875 after linking to John Rutherford Wight (1829–1919).

He lived with his wife and family at 32 Minto Street Edinburgh from 1863 until death. His offices were at 7 St Andrew Square from 1868 onwards. This building was demolished in 2014.

He died of old age at his home in 1908.

He is buried in the family plot in Canongate Kirkyard in the south-east corner of the eastern extension with his parents and siblings. His grandfather, Rev Thomas Hardy DD lies to their side.

== Main Works (excluding villas) ==
- 46-55 George IV Bridge (1861)
- 1–13 Johnston Terrace (1862)
- 16 Johnston Terrace/tenements on Castle Wynd North (1864)
- Newcraighall Church and church hall, outskirts of Edinburgh (1876) in brick
- Mayfield Established Church, Edinburgh (1878) now Craigmillar Park Church
- South Leith Free Church, Easter Road (1880) spire added 1902, now known as St Andrews Church)
- Granton and Wardie Free Church and manse (to west), Inverleith Terrace, Edinburgh (1880) now Edinburgh Tabernacle Church
- West St Giles Church, Angle Park Terrace, Edinburgh (1881) demolished to build flats in 1979
- Loanhead Church (1882)
- Jedburgh Grammar School (1884)
- Robertson Memorial Church, Kings Stables Road, Edinburgh (1884)
- Rebuilding of Edrom Parish Church (1885)
- Remodelling of Morningside Parish Church (1888)
- Remodelling of St Bernards Church, Saxe-Coburg Terrace, Edinburgh (1888)
- Ancrum Parish Church (1888)
- Bailie Hall, Newton St Boswells (1890)
- Roberton Church (1891)
- Castlebay Church, Barra (1892)
- Stair hall and SW extensions Highland Tolbooth Church, Edinburgh (1893)
- Deaconess Hospital, Edinburgh (1894) plus southern extension of 1897 – now converted to flats
- St James Parish Church, McDonald Road, Edinburgh (1894) demolished to build flats 1985
- Remodelling of Kirtle Parish Church, Kirtlebridge (1896)
- Morebattle Parish Church (1898)
- Kennoway Parish Church plus church hall (1899)
- Tynecastle Church, Edinburgh (1900)
- Ednam Parish Church (1902)
