= William Gloag (minister) =

King's Almoner to King George III

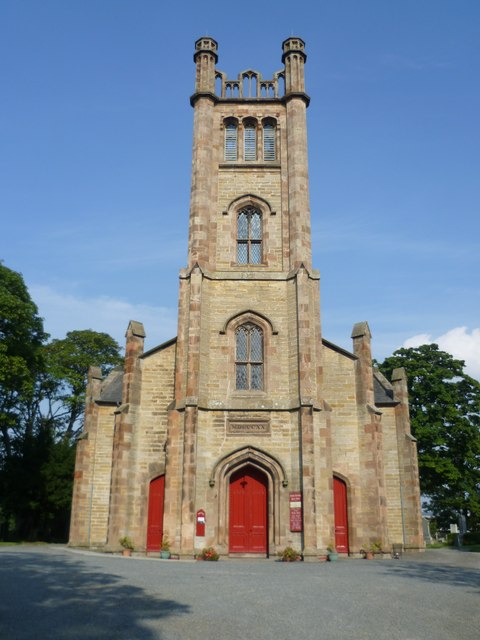
Cockpen Parish Church

William Gloag (c. 1735–1802) was a Church of Scotland minister who served as King's Almoner to King George III.

== Life ==
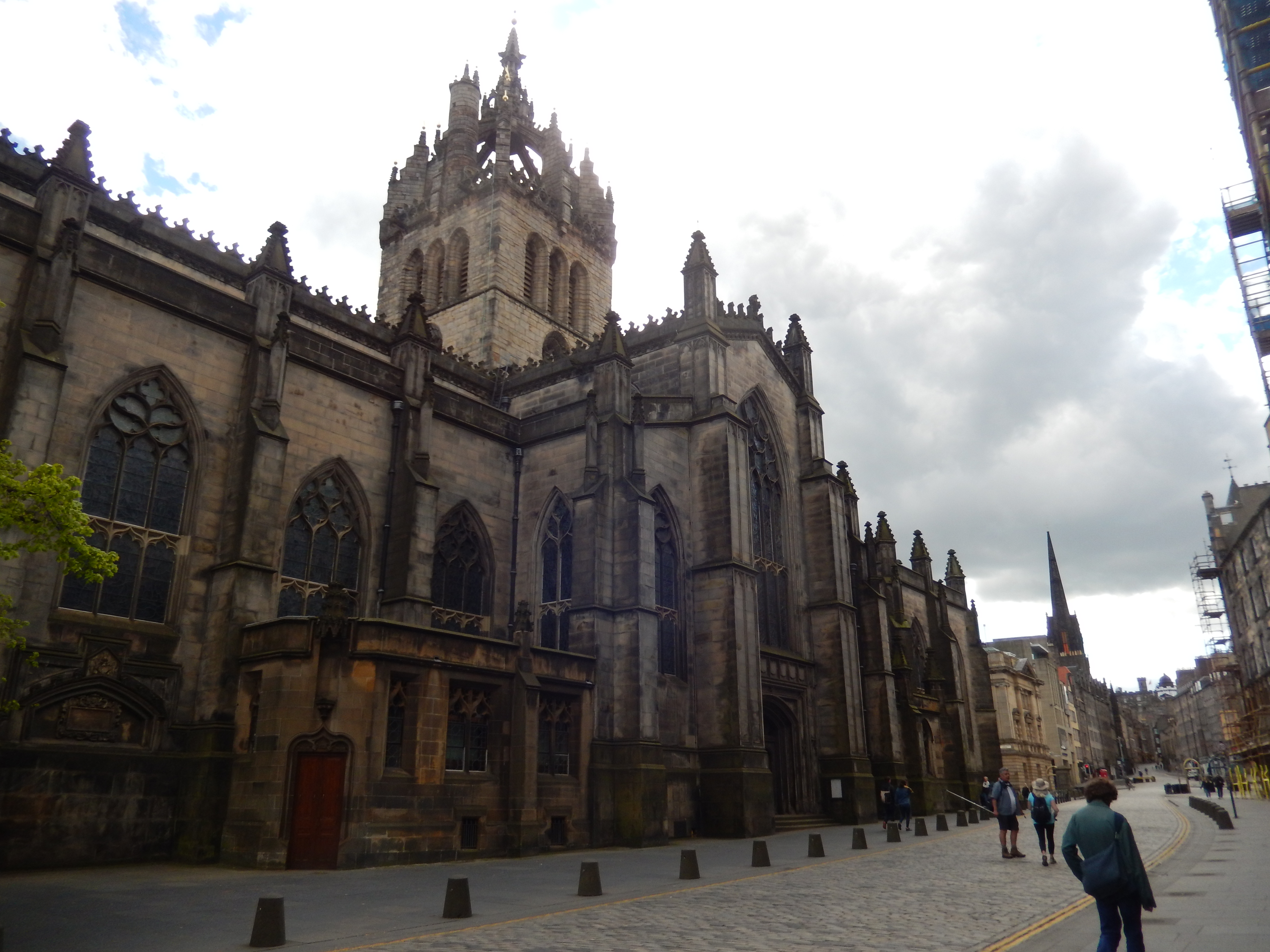
St. Giles' Cathedral

He was born in the manse at West Calder the son of Rev Andrew Gloag (d. 1770), the parish minister, and Christian Ronald, daughter of Thomas Ronald, Provost of Linlithgow. He was educated locally then studied at the University of Edinburgh, training as a minister.

He was ordained as minister of Cockpen in April 1758 and translated to Lady Yester's Kirk in Edinburgh in October 1767 in place of Rev John Drysdale. In February 1770 the University of Edinburgh awarded him an honorary Doctor of Divinity. In July 1772 he moved to New (West) Kirk of St Giles one of the four parishes then contained within St Giles Cathedral on the Royal Mile in Edinburgh.

In May 1781 he was made Junior Clerk of the General Assembly. He was then living at upper Baxters Close off the Royal Mile.

In February 1799 he was created King's Almoner in Scotland to King George III. In this role he was responsible for distributing monies (alms) in the name of the King to people or charities.

Gloag died at 3 Park Street in Edinburgh on 27 April 1802. Sir Henry Moncrieff-Wellwood preached at Gloag's funeral service on 2 May 1802.

== Family ==
In November 1773 he married Euphemia Wilson, daughter of William Wilson of Soonhope, an Edinburgh "writer" (lawyer). Their children included:

- John Gloag, an Edinburgh merchant and magistrate, with warehouse premises on Blair Street (and living on Roxburgh St)
- Euphemia (b. 1775) married William Kerr of the Edinburgh Post Office
- Andrew (b. 1777) died in infancy
- Jean (1778-1803)
- Susanna (b. 1782) died in infancy
- Henrietta (b. 1785)
- Martha (b. 1790)
