= Craigdam =

Hamlet in Aberdeenshire, Scotland

Coordinates: 57.3637°N 2.2572°W

Craigdam is a hamlet in the Formartine area of Aberdeenshire, Scotland, situated in a rural agricultural area.

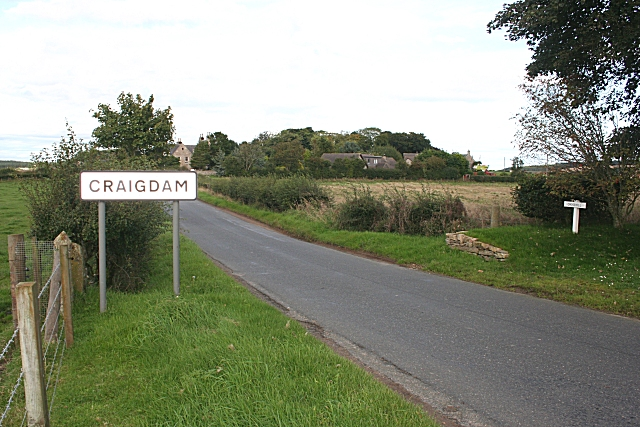
View of the site in 2008.

== Geography ==
Craigdam lies in a predominantly agricultural area of the Formartine district of Aberdeenshire.

== History ==
Craigdam has historically been a small rural settlement, appearing in gazetteers and mapping as a minor hamlet.
