= James Smith (university principal) =

- Born: 1681
- Died: 1736 (aged 54–55); Coldstream, Scotland
- Occupations: Minister, professor, principal

James Smith (1681–1736) was a Church of Scotland minister in Cramond and the Principal of the University of Edinburgh from 1733 to 1736. He had been appointed professor of Divinity on 16 Feb 1732 and succeeded Dr William Hamilton in both offices. He was also twice Moderator of the General Assembly of the Church of Scotland.

== Life ==
Little is known of his early life but he was born in 1681. He was private tutor to the children of Dalrymple of Cousland and then to Robert Dundas of Arniston, the Elder.

He was licensed to preach as a Church of Scotland minister by the Presbytery of Dalkeith in October 1703. He was ordained as minister of Morham Parish Church in East Lothian in September 1706. He translated to Cramond Parish Church in January 1712. Whilst there he served as Moderator of the General Assembly in 1723 in succession to Rev William Mitchell.

He served a second year as Moderator in 1731. In 1732 he accepted the post as Professor of Divinity at Edinburgh University. In July 1733 he also took on the role as minister of New (West) Kirk in St Giles (only 500m from the university). He was also Chalain in Ordinary to the King. In October 1733 he was made Principal of the University of Edinburgh.

He made a trip to Bristol in the summer of 1736 but died at Coldstream during the return journey on 14 August 1736.

== Family ==
He was married to Catherine Oswald (1685-1730)

== Publications ==
- Sermon after the Death of Rev James Craig (1731)
- The Misery of Ignorant and Unconverted Sinners (1733)

Preceded by William Hamilton	Principals of Edinburgh University; 1732–1736	Succeeded by William Wishart (secundus)
