= Spirit of Portsmouth =

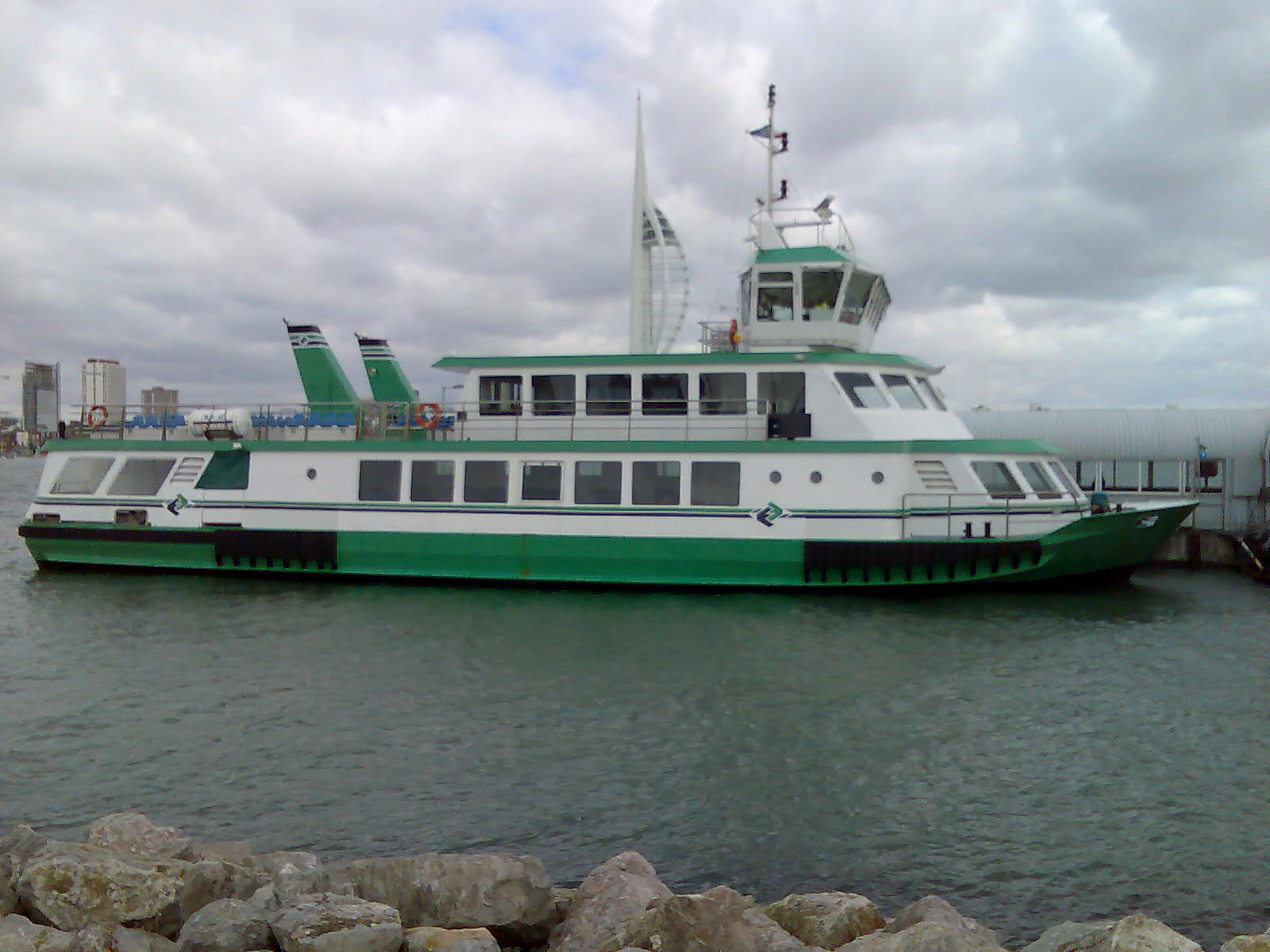
- Spirit of Portsmouth at Gosport

History
- Name: Spirit of Portsmouth
- Owner: Gosport Ferry
- Builder: VT Halmatic
- Launched: 2005
- Identification: IMO number: 9319894

General characteristics
- Tonnage: 377 GT; 30 DWT
- Length: 32.60 m (107.0 ft)
- Beam: 10.20 m (33.5 ft)
- Draft: 2.1 m (6 ft 11 in)
- Installed power: 360 hp (270 kW) Scania DI12 diesel
- Propulsion: Veth VZ2000 Azimuth thrusters
- Speed: 10 knots (19 km/h; 12 mph)
- Capacity: 300 passengers
- Crew: 3 or 4

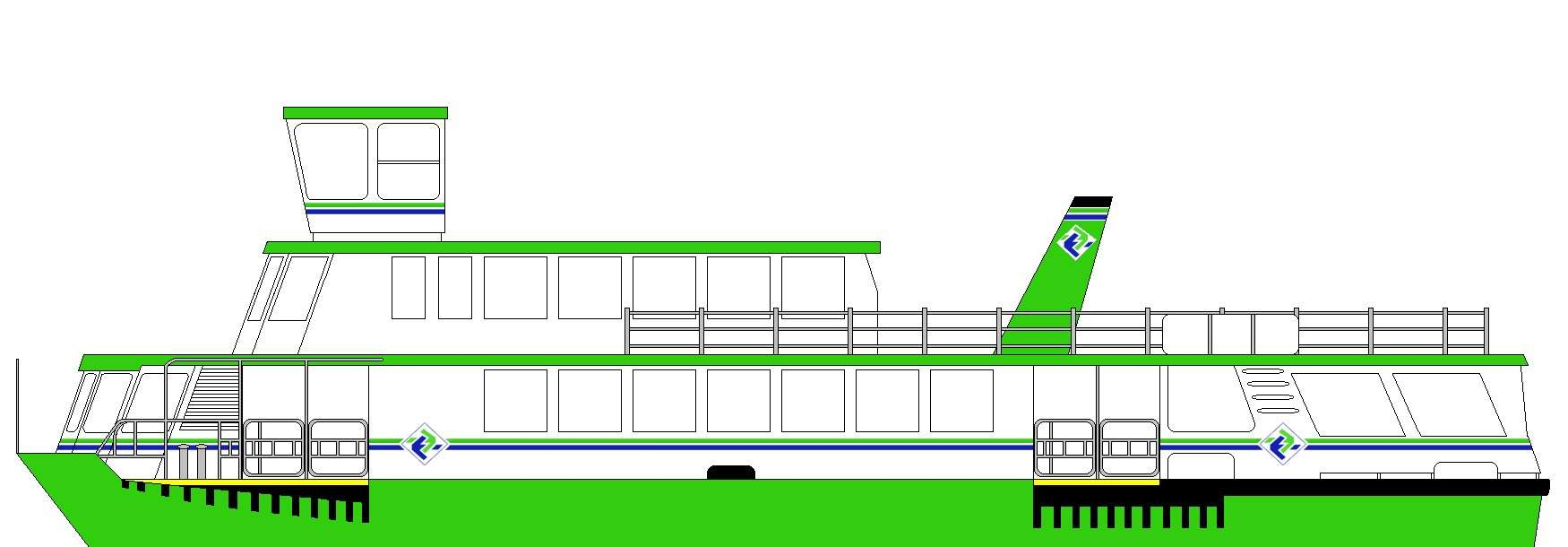

Spirit of Portsmouth is a vessel owned by Gosport Ferry and built by VT Halmatic of Portchester.

== History ==
Shortly after being awarded the contract for the current Spirit of Gosport in 2001, Abels Shipbuilders were awarded a follow-on contract for a second ferry, which was to be known as Spirit of Portsmouth. However this vessel was only partially constructed when the ferry company cancelled the order, and the unfinished hull remained at Abel's shipyard for many years, before being completed as a medical missionary ferry, the Forth Hope.

The need for a second vessel to run alongside the similar Spirit of Gosport still existed, and the current Spirit of Portsmouth was built in 2005. She is primarily used for cruising Portsmouth Harbour and the Solent, thus enabled Spirit of Gosport to replace Portsmouth Queen on the Gosport to Portsmouth ferry route. The main difference between the two Spirit of vessels is the covered roof and bar on Spirit of Portsmouth, making her more suited to cruising. Spirit of Portsmouth however, services the ferry route when either Spirit of Gosport, the twin vessel of Spirit of Portsmouth, or the other ferry Harbour Spirit are out of service.

Upon the introduction of Spirit of Portsmouth, the Portsmouth Queen was withdrawn and sold. The previous vessel that was dedicated to cruise duty was Solent Enterprise. Spirit of Portsmouth is currently the Gosport Ferries flagship. in 2015 they gave her a refit with a new paint job and a new engine with a 2,1 turbine and a new radar.

== Characteristics ==
The Spirit of Portsmouth is 32.60 metres (107.0 ft) in length and has a beam of 10.20 metres (33.5 ft) and a draught of 2.1 metres (6 ft 11 in). She has a service speed of 10 knots (19 km/h; 12 mph) and a capacity of 300 passengers. She carries either three or four crew depending on the nature of the voyage.
