= MV Cruiser =

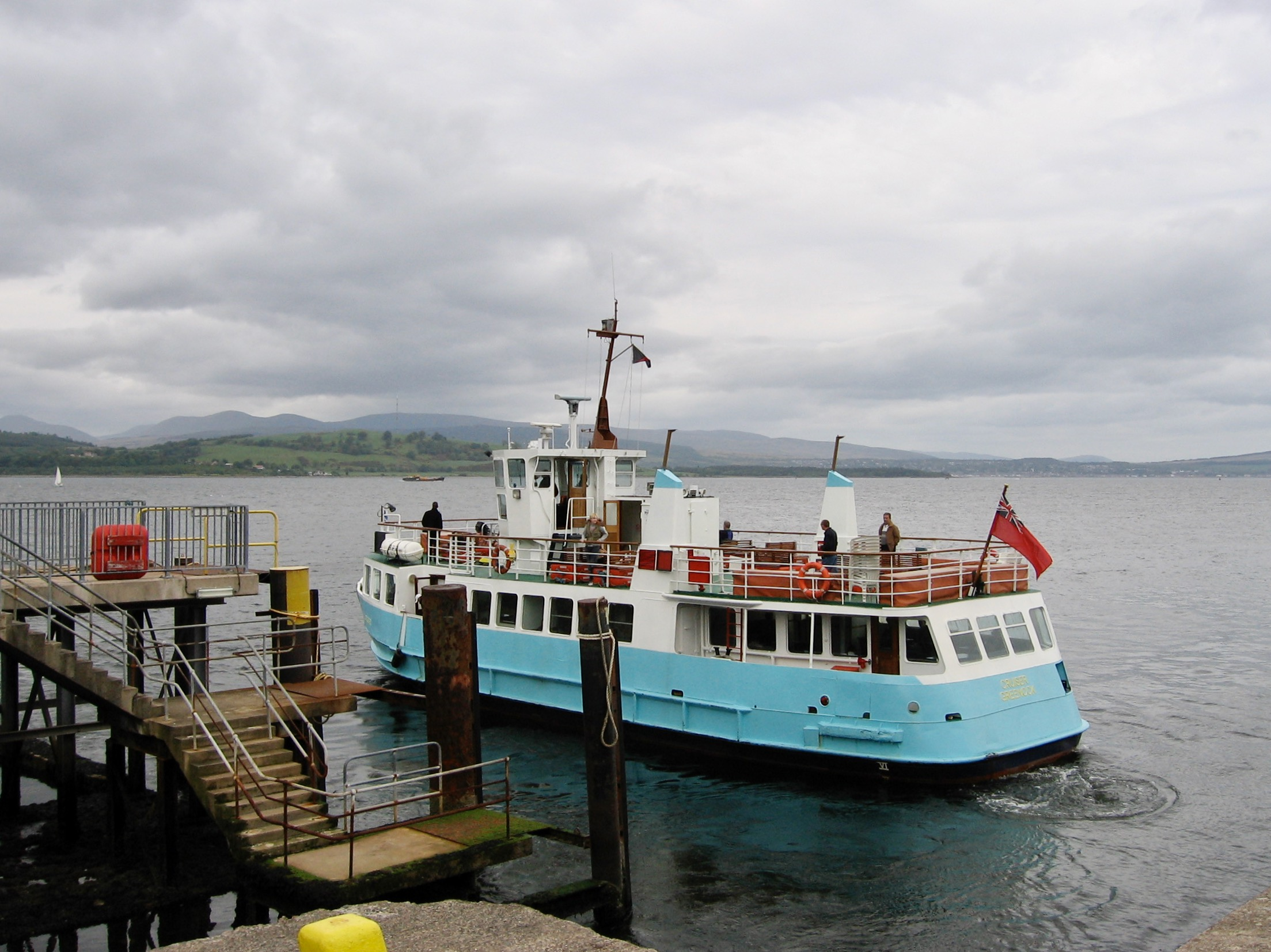
- Cruiser in 2006 off Kilcreggan Steps, Gourock, by mid 2008 the hull was dark blue.

History

United Kingdom
- Name: Southsea Queen (1974–1978); Hythe Hotspur (1978–1997); Poole Scene (1997–1999); Cruiser (1999–present)
- Owner: Gosport Ferry (1974–1978); White Horse Ferries (1978–1995); Brownsea Island Ferries (1995–1997); Blue Funnel Cruises (1997–1999); Clyde Marine Services (1999–2023); Jetstream Tours (2023-present)
- Operator: Jetstream Tours
- Route: Thames Estuary
- Builder: James & Stone, Brightlingsea
- Launched: 1974
- Home port: Queenborough, Isle of Sheppey
- Identification: IMO number: 7341049; MMSI number: 235062593; Callsign: GUEL
- Status: In service

General characteristics
- Tonnage: 119 GRT
- Length: 24 m (78.7 ft)
- Beam: 7.6 m (24.9 ft)
- Draught: 1.6 m (5.2 ft) (aft)
- Depth: 2.8 m (9.2 ft)
- Installed power: 224 KW (300 bhp)
- Propulsion: 2 × Gardner engines; 2 × Schottelrudder propellers at aft end; 1 × Schottellow thrust forward; Changed to twin screw on shafts.
- Speed: 9 knots (17 km/h)
- Capacity: 240 passengers (max)

Cruiser is a passenger vessel owned by Jetstream Tours operating in the Thames Estuary including sailings from Southend Pier and various north Kent ports. She regularly sails to the Thames forts. Her former names are Southsea Queen, Hythe Hotspur and Poole Scene.

== History ==
Southsea Queen was built in 1974 by James & Stone of Brightlingsea for the Gosport Ferry Company for cruising and standby ferry duties. She was similar to Solent Enterprise, from the same shipyard but with a flared pointed bow. However, at 119 GRT she proved too small for her job and just four years later was sold to General Estates who then owned Hythe Ferry, till the whole ferry company changed ownership to White Horse Ferries in 1997 for use on its Hythe Ferry service, and event cruises, evening dicso cruises and Day Trip's returns to Ryde, Isle of Wight. She was renamed Hythe Hotspur and repainted from her green with red band livery to a red and white livery and a bar was installed for use on Cruises.

She was withdrawn from this service in 1995 and chartered to Brownsea Island Ferries for service in Poole Harbour. She initially kept the name Hythe Hotspur but was later sold to Blue Funnel Cruises in 1997 and renamed Poole Scene. She sailed from Poole Quay until early 1998, when she returned to Southampton.

In 1999, she was sold to Clyde Marine Services and renamed Cruiser. As such, she operated as a charter cruise vessel out of Greenock, cruising the River and Firth of Clyde. This included the weekday Rosneath ferry service from Gourock to Kilcreggan on behalf of SPT, as a substitute vessel when MV Kenilworth was out of service. In 2007 Clyde Marine introduced Seabus on this route, but in 2012 SPT accepted the tender from Clydelink for the service.

In 2023 Cruiser was sold to Jetstream Tours Ltd and relocated to the Thames and Medway. Cruiser was fitted with an additional deck aft of the bridge to facilitate loading and unloading of RFA ships in the Clyde but proved beneficial for working at piers and Wharfs in the Thames and Medway.
