= Sundance (charter vessel) =

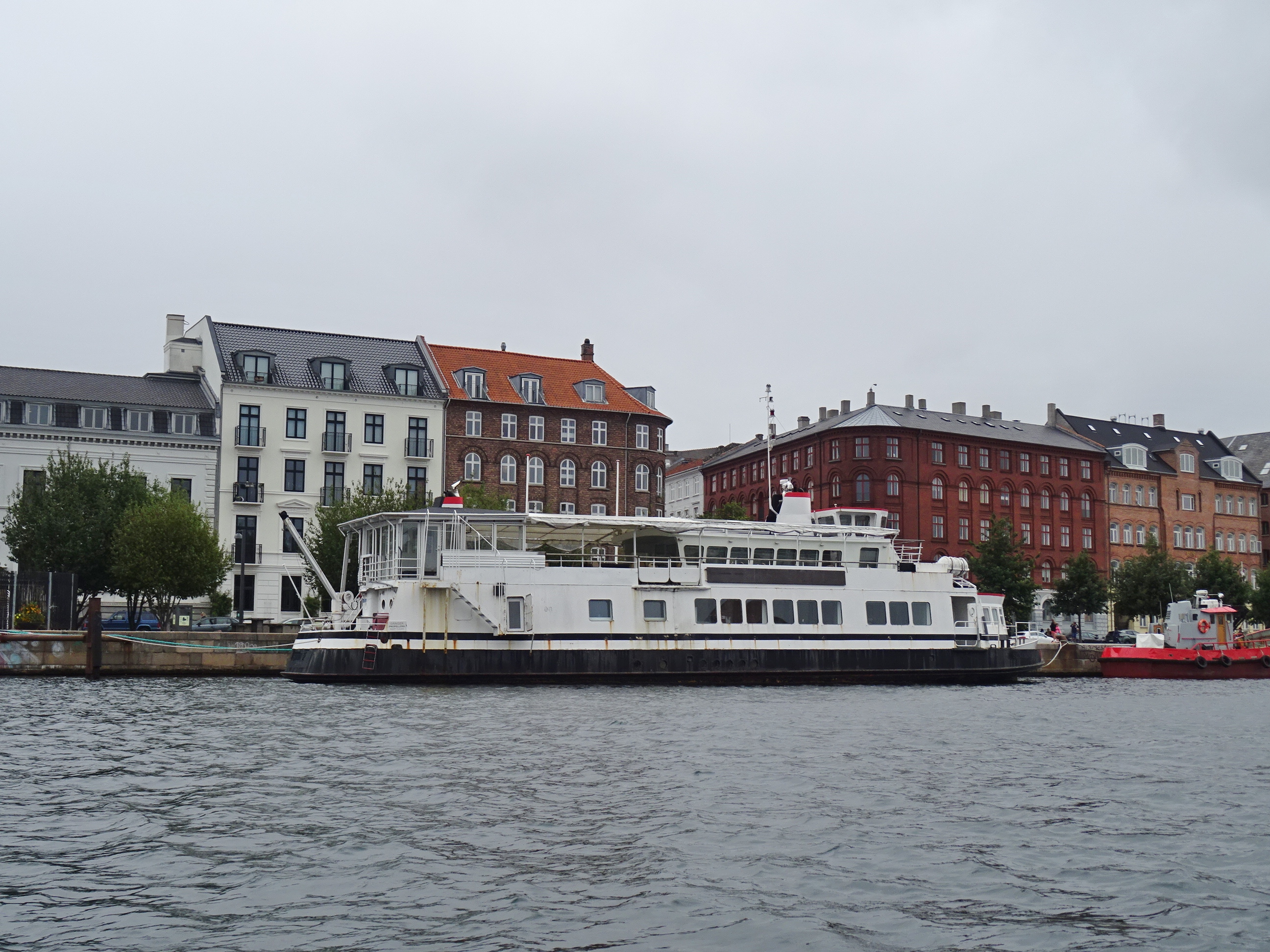
- Sundance in Copenhagen

History
- Name: Gay Enterprise(1971–1979); Solent Enterprise(1979–2005); Sundance (2005–)
- Owner: Gosport Ferry (1971–2005); Capital Pleasure Boats (2005–2008)
- Builder: James and Stone
- Launched: 1971
- Identification: IMO number: 8633762

Sundance, formerly Solent Enterprise and Gay Enterprise, is a charter vessel that formerly operated on the Solent and River Thames in England. It later moved to Copenhagen in Denmark.

== History ==
The vessel was built in 1971 for the Gosport Ferry service by James and Stone of Brightlingsea, primarily for cruising Portsmouth Harbour and the Solent. Originally named Gay Enterprise, it was renamed in the winter of 1979, during her standby ferry duties, to Solent Enterprise. It had a similar design to the company's two 1966 Queens (Portsmouth Queen and Gosport Queen) but the interior was more comfortable because of its different duty. It was painted in later years in a blue livery with a large Solent Enterprise banner on its side barriers.

From 1979, it was regularly used on ferry duties between Gosport and Portsmouth when either of the Queens were out of service. In 2001, Gosport Ferry Company purchased a new ferry, the Spirit of Gosport, but the company also wanted to replace the Solent Enterprise in its cruising role.

Both Queens therefore stayed on, and the Spirit of Gosport only had a few ferry duties in its first few months. In 2005, another new vessel was purchased, Spirit of Portsmouth. This was fitted out with a covered top deck and a bar and to suit its cruise duties. This meant that Solent Enterprise was no longer required by the Gosport Ferry service and she was sold to Capital Pleasure Boats in 2005. Her new owners renamed her Sundance and she operated on the River Thames in London as a charter vessel catering for parties, corporate entertainment, weddings and other functions. Later, she was sold again and moved to Copenhagen to be used as a floating cafe.

In the early hours of the morning of 11 February 2016, a fire broke out on board completely engulfing the top deck and left her badly damaged. Sundance was repaired and turned back into a houseboat but remains in Copenhagen today under new ownership.
