= MV Forth Hope =

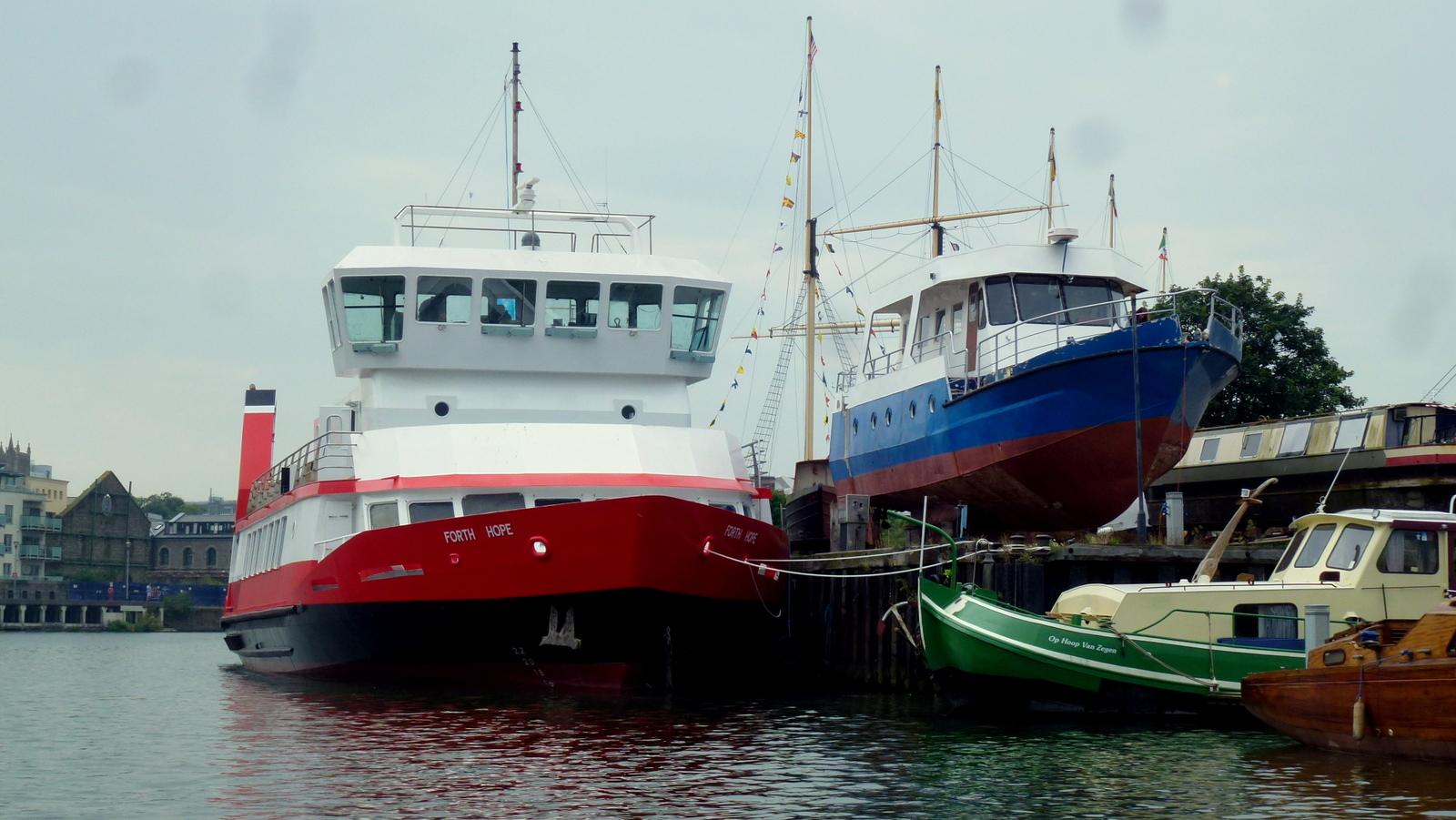
- Forth Hope in 2016 before departing Abels Shipyard in Bristol for Rosyth Dockyard

History
- Name: Forth Hope
- Owner: Vine Trust
- Builder: Abels Shipbuilders
- Launched: 2002
- Christened: 2017
- Identification: MMSI:319111900

General characteristics
- Type: Ferry
- Length: 35 m (114 ft 10 in)
- Beam: 10 m (32 ft 10 in)
- Draught: 1.9 m (6 ft 3 in)

MV Forth Hope is a medical ferry operated by the Vine Trust as part of the charity's Amazon Hope project. The ship operates on the Amazon River from a base in Iquitos in Peru. The Forth Hope is 35 metres (114 ft 10 in) in length and has a beam of 10 metres (32 ft 10 in). In her medical missionary role, she is equipped with consultation rooms, operating theatre, laboratory, pharmacy, and dental surgery. The vessel previously flew a Cayman Islands flag but is now registered and flagged in Peru. It has a draught of 1.9 metres, is 35 metres long and 10 metres in breadth, and has a maximum speed of 7.1 knots.

== History ==
The Forth Hope was originally built in 2002 by Abels Shipbuilders of Bristol, England for the Gosport Ferry Company Ltd. She is a twin sister ship to the Spirit of Gosport, a passenger ferry also built by Abels, that connects Gosport and Portsmouth on England's south coast. Forth Hope was intended to be named Spirit of Portsmouth and operate alongside her sister. However, she was only partially constructed when the ferry company cancelled the order, and she was never given her intended name, which was eventually reused for a subsequent Spirit of Portsmouth built by VT Halmatic. The unfinished vessel remained at Abel's shipyard in Bristol Harbour for many years, until it was finally completed in 2016.

After completion, the vessel was moved to Rosyth Dockyard on the Firth of Forth via the Irish Sea and Caledonian Canal, before being outfitted by Babcock Marine for her new role as a medical ship. In May 2017, the ship was formally named Forth Hope by the Princess Royal, who is patron of the Vine Trust. Leaving the Forth in July, the vessel completed her delivery voyage, of nearly 6,800 miles (10,900 km), when she arrived in Iquitos on 7 September 2017. The vessel was again visited by the Princess Royal in September 2017, this time whilst she was moored at the Peruvian village of Oran.
