= Strathkinness =

Coordinates: 56.3356°N 2.8769°W

- Location within Fife
- Population: 790 (2020)
- OS grid reference: NO458162
- Council area: Fife
- Lieutenancy area: Fife
- Country: Scotland
- Sovereign state: United Kingdom
- Post town: ST. ANDREWS
- Postcode district: KY16
- Dialling code: 01334
- Police: Scotland
- Fire: Scottish
- Ambulance: Scottish
- UK Parliament: North East Fife
- Scottish Parliament: North East Fife

Strathkinness is a small village located 3 miles to the west of St Andrews in North East Fife.

A key characteristic of the village is the newly developed housing in the centre of the village.

Children in Strathkinness and the neighbouring village of Blebo Craigs go to Strathkinness Primary School. Children of age for secondary school normally attend Madras College in St Andrews.

== History ==
The assassination of Archbishop Sharp was committed at Magus Muir, to the south of the village, in 1679.

== Parish Church ==
Strathkinness Parish Church is part of the Church of Scotland. It has been linked with Hope Park Church, St Andrews since 2005.

On 27 October 2010, the Reverend David Arnott (who was minister of Strathkinness Parish Church from 2005 until 2010) was nominated to be the Moderator of the General Assembly of the Church of Scotland for 2011–2012.

== Facilities ==
Strathkinness has a primary school, a village hall, a church, a church hall, a pub with a restaurant, two large parks with play-areas and several bed and breakfasts. There was once a post office, but it was closed due to a lack of profit.

There is a campsite around a mile along the High Road towards Pitscottie.

Rufflets is a 4 star hotel, on the B939 Strathkinness Low Road, about halfway to St Andrews.
