= Hugin (longship) =

Viking ship replica in Kent, England

Coordinates: 51°19′43.6″N 1°22′22.7″E

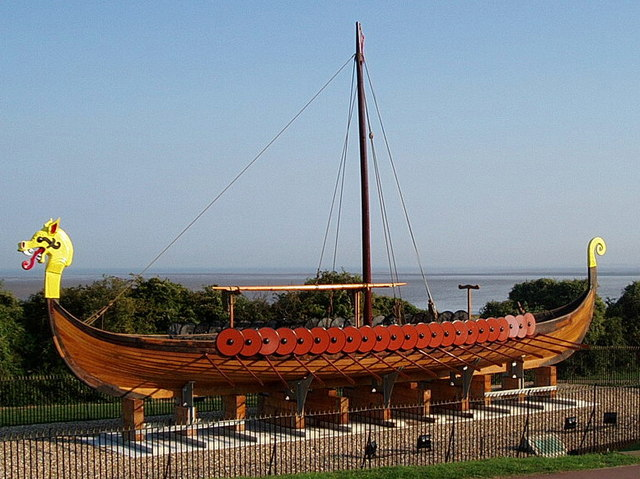

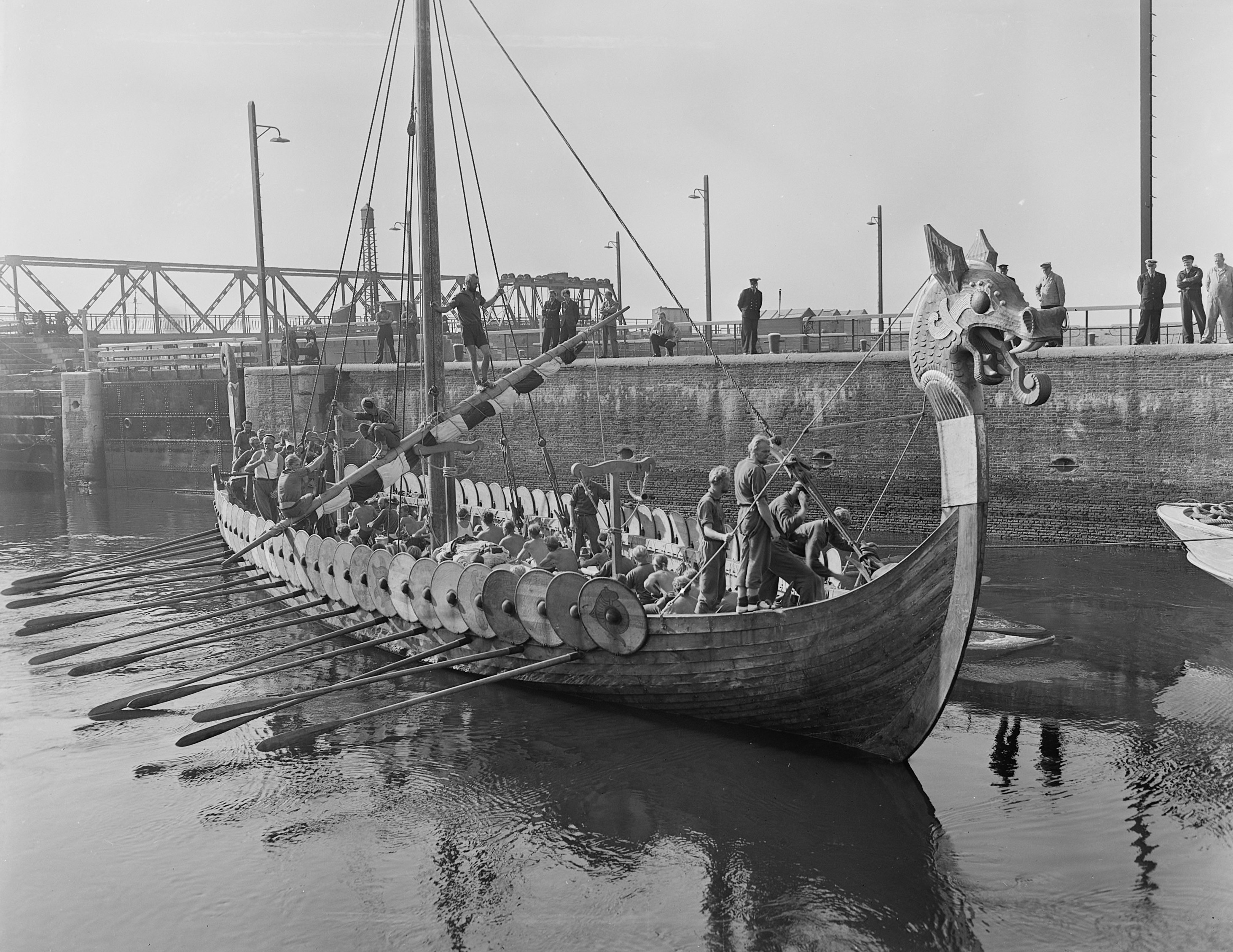
The Hugin in 1949

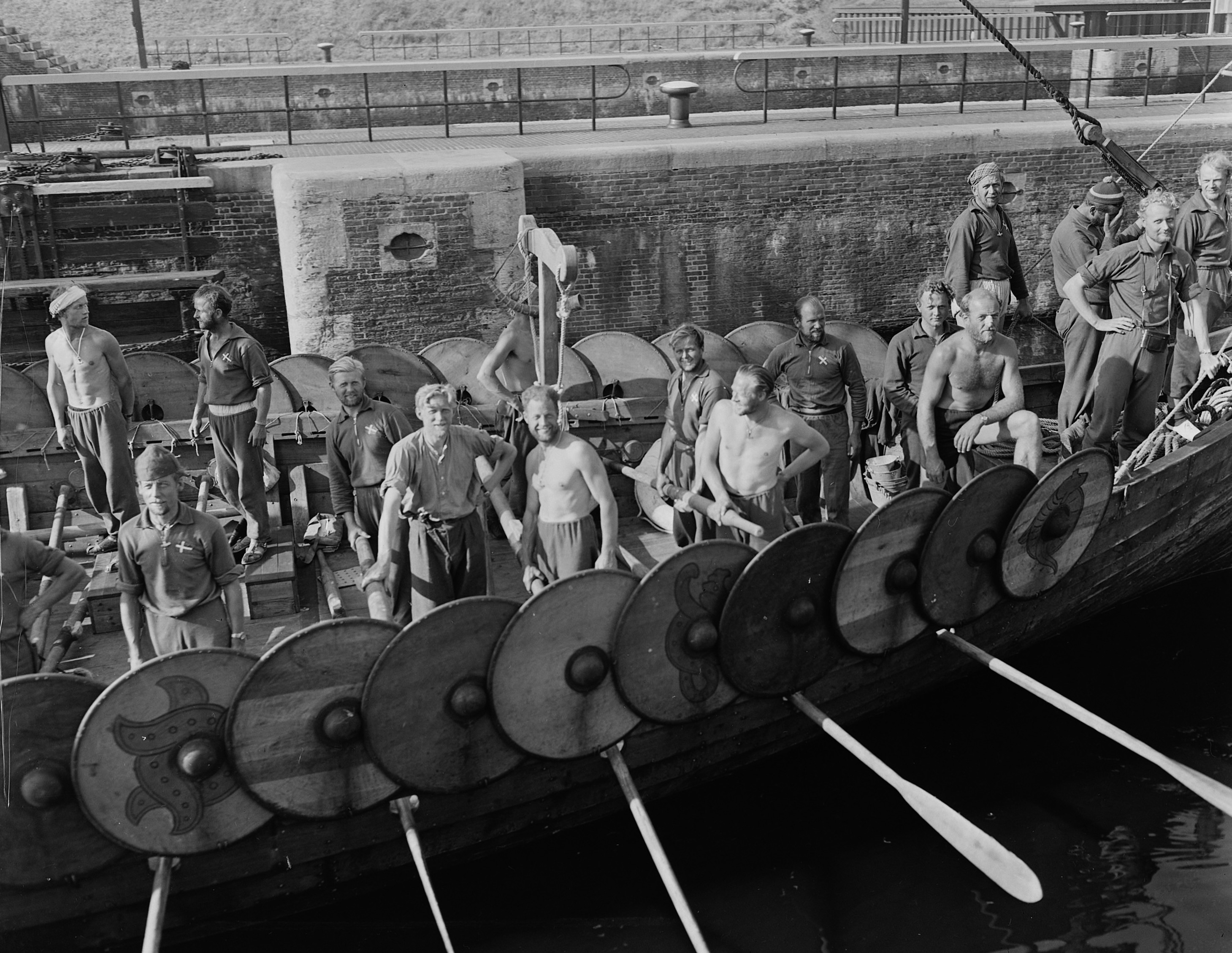
The Hugin in the sluices of IJmuiden, the Netherlands (1949)

The Hugin is a reconstructed longship located at Pegwell Bay in Kent, England. It was a gift from the Danish government commemorating the 1500th anniversary of the arrival of Hengist and Horsa, leaders of the Anglo-Saxon invasion, at nearby Ebbsfleet. The ship is a replica of the much later ca. 890 Gokstad ship.

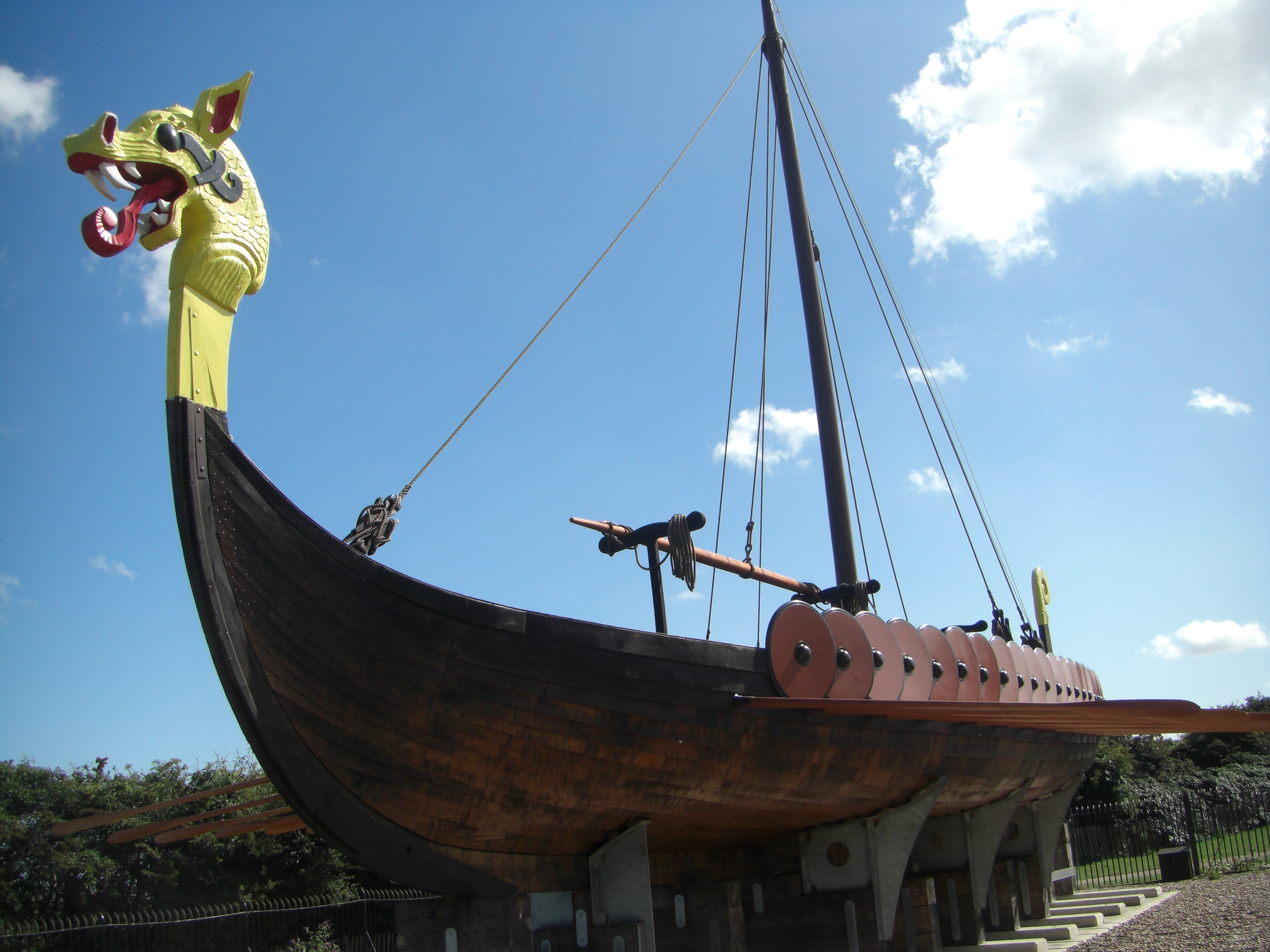

The boat was built in Denmark whence it was sailed by 53 Danes to England in 1949. The ship landed at Viking Bay in Broadstairs, Kent. The ship was presented to the people of Thanet by the King of Denmark, its costs having been paid by the Daily Mail, and placed in its current location. In 2005 the ship underwent major repairs coordinated by marine restoration specialist Fred Walker and funded by Thanet District Council assisted by EU funding.

Hugin’s arrival was presented in a newsreel short entitled "Kent Welcomes Viking Invaders", which British Pathé has uploaded to the internet. Footage from the newsreel was used in the 1965 Doctor Who serial The Time Meddler to represent an 11th-century Viking raiding party.

In 1979 the ship was featured on the rear cover of The Stranglers album The Raven, showing the band inside the ship.
