= Gosport Ferry =

Ferry service in Hampshire, England

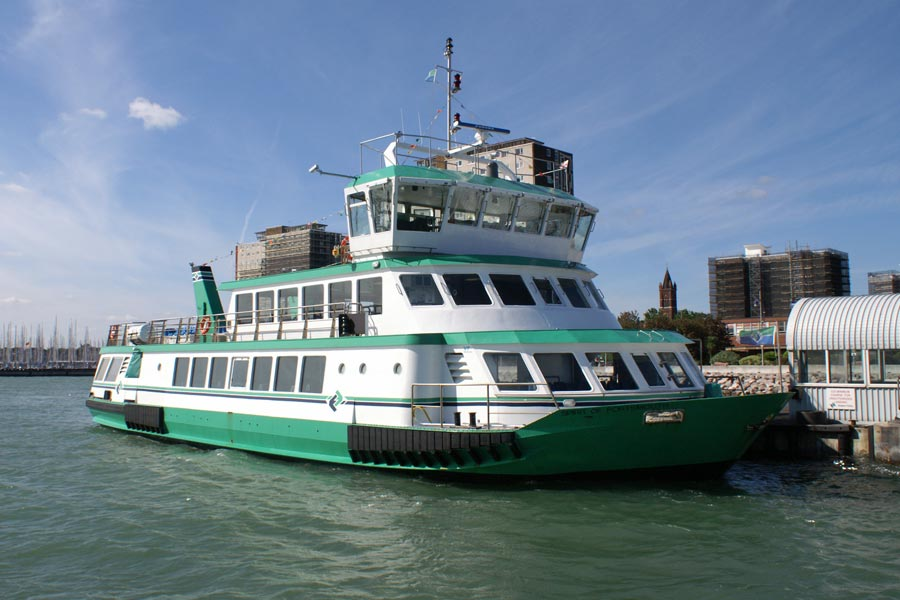
- The Spirit of Portsmouth at Gosport
- Locale: Hampshire, England
- Route: Gosport - Portsmouth
- Operator: Gosport Ferry Ltd

The Gosport Ferry is a ferry service for pedestrians and cyclists operating between Gosport and Portsmouth in Hampshire, southern England. It is currently owned by TC UK Topco Limited.

== History ==
The company that currently operates the Gosport ferry was created in 1883 as the Port of Portsmouth Steam Launch & Towing Company, making it one of the longest serving ferry services in the UK. In 1963, it took over the Gosport & Portsea Watermen's Steam Launch Company, founded in 1875 by the watermen, who had operated ferries on the route for centuries. These watermen had enjoyed protected rights between 1603 and 1840, limiting operation of ferries on the route to Gosport residents.

Portsmouth Floating Bridge Act 1838
- Act of Parliament
- Parliament of the United Kingdom
- Long title: An Act for establishing a Floating Bridge or Bridges over the Harbour of Portsmouth from or near a Place called Gosport Beach, in the Parish of Alverstoke in the County of Southampton, to the opposite Shore, to or near a Place called Portsmouth Point, in the Parish of Portsmouth in the said County, with proper Approaches thereto.
- Citation: 1 & 2 Vict. c. xi

Dates
- Royal assent: 9 May 1838

Text of statute as originally enacted

Portsmouth Harbour Floating Bridge Act 1840
- Act of Parliament
- Parliament of the United Kingdom
- Long title: An Act for amending and enlarging the Powers of an Act for establishing a Floating Bridge or Bridges over the Harbour of Portsmouth in the County of Southampton.
- Citation: 3 & 4 Vict. c. liv

Dates
- Royal assent: 4 June 1840
Other legislation
Amends	Portsmouth Floating Bridge Act 1838

Text of statute as originally enacted

In 1840, a steam operated chain ferry was introduced, to a design similar to that already in use at Woolston. The chain ferry ceased operation in 1959.

Upon the takeover in 1963, the company changed its name to the Portsmouth Harbour Ferry Company (plc since 2001). In addition to Gosport Ferries Ltd and other related interests, PHFC also owns Clarence Marine Engineering Ltd, which provides maintenance services for the ferries as well as general marine engineering services. Gosport Ferries Ltd was incorporated in 1988, registered company 2254382; Clarence Marine Engineering was incorporated in 1987, registered company 2139067. Both are non-trading companies whose registered office is located in South Street, Gosport, head offices for the Gosport Ferry Ltd plc, registered company 18751.

In 2004, Falkand Islands Holdings completed a hostile takeover with a value of £7.5 million. The takeover was met with controversy as it was believed that a single shareholder would cut investment and raise fares. On 10 December the Falkland Island Company released a statement announcing it had over 51% of the total shares and setting out the terms for the purchase of the rest. In 2016, Falkland Islands Holdings changed its name to FIH group. In March 2026 FIH group sold the ferry business for £11.6 million to a company owned by TC UK Topco Limited.

== Timetable ==
In response to the challenges posed by the 2020 pandemic, the ferry service has undergone adjustments to its schedule. Presently, a single boat departs every 15 minutes in both directions, a modification from the previous setup of a two-ferry service with departures every 7.5 minutes. During special events like the Victorious Festival, the service will run two boats, ensuring a more frequent interval service to accommodate the increased demand.

== Current fleet ==
Ferry name	Built	Entered service	Information	Image
Spirit of Gosport	2001	2001	Spirit of Gosport was built in 2001 and is the oldest ship in the fleet. It is painted in standard Gosport Ferry livery and has a single enclosed deck and an open upper deck. During its first few months in service it ran alongside the two Queens due to teething problems.	
Spirit of Portsmouth	2005	2005	Spirit of Portsmouth is the second newest vessel of the fleet. It is to a similar design to that of Spirit of Gosport, but has a covered top deck and a bar, so it is normally used on cruise services. The vessel does, however, operate on the ferry service when either of the other vessels are unavailable. Spirit of Portsmouth is painted in standard Gosport Ferry livery.	
Harbour Spirit	2014	2015	Harbour Spirit is the newest member of the fleet and went into operation in May 2015. It is similar in size to the Spirit of Gosport, carrying up to 300 passengers, and includes more modern facilities, better cycle storage, and more sheltered seating.	

== Notable past fleet ==
- The Gosport Queen was built in 1966 and was used for refit cover for a number of years. The Gosport Queen, sister-ship to the former Portsmouth Queen, was sold in January 2017 to London Party Boats and will be used for party cruises on the River Thames; she will be renamed Pearl of London. The Gosport Queen left Gosport for the final time on 20 January 2017.
- The Portsmouth Queen was built in 1966. This vessel replaced the other two original, smaller, Gosport ferries. However three of the original, smaller diesel-powered ferries were kept and used for harbour cruises in the summer and standby ferry duties in the winter months, when Gosport Queen or Portsmouth Queen was away for refit. The three original ferries the company kept were Vita, Vesta and Ferry Queen; they were fondly known by retired Captain Albert 'Tiddler' Jessey and his grandchild as 'The Marjorie Daw boats' (after the nursery rhyme), as they rolled in rough weather like the motion of a seesaw. In 1974 Vita, Vesta and Ferry Queen were sold with the arrival of the 'Southsea Queen'. The Portsmouth Queen has since been sold to Absolute Charters. She left Gosport for the final time on 29 February 2016 to start a new life as a party cruise boat on the River Thames in London and will be renamed London Queen. However, to date, work has stalled on the refit of the former Portsmouth Queen and the vessel remains in Queenborough and is once again up for sale.
- Solent Enterprise (formerly Gay Enterprise) was previously the pride of the fleet. Of 275 tons, she was built in 1971 to provide cruise services and standby ferry duties. When on the ferry run she was typically used at rush and peak periods. She looked similar to the other ferries built in 1966, but had a bar, dance floor, restaurant, deck shelter and was painted with an apple green hull and funnels, but instead of the red logo, with white PHF lettering, she had a dark green band, all the way round the white superstructure. This ferry was replaced in 2003 by the Spirit of Portsmouth and was sold in 2005 to Capital Pleasure Boats, who renamed her Sundance for operation on the River Thames. Solent Enterprise is now in Copenhagen and is being used as a floating cafe; she is known as Cafe Sundance. In the early hours of the morning of 11 February 2016, a fire broke out on board, which completely engulfed the top deck and left her badly damaged. However today, Sundance has been completely repaired and is now used as a houseboat by its current owners.
- The Southsea Queen was built in 1974 of 119 tons, to replace the three original diesel ferries Vita, Vesta and Ferry Queen, but she was unsuccessful and was sold to White Horse Ferries four years later, in 1978. She subsequently operated on the Hythe Ferry service where she was renamed Hythe Hotspur. She was withdrawn from this service in 1995. After a period on charter to Brownsea Island Ferries in Poole Harbour, she was bought by Clyde Maritime Services and renamed Cruiser.

== Cruises ==
The Gosport Ferry also operates cruises around the Solent. In the early 70s cruises were operated by Solent Enterprise (then Gay Enterprise), Vita, Vesta and Ferry Queen (three of the smaller original diesel ferries). The three were sold, (with the arrival of Southsea Queen in 1974), however in 1978 Southsea Queen was sold. The cruises after that continued to be operated by just the company's cruise ferry Solent Enterprise, however it has been known on the odd occasions, (in the late 80s and early 90s) for one of the Queens to operate on a Harbour or Solent cruise, (when either Portsmouth Queen or Gosport Queen were not operating on their usual work horse ferry duties). In the height of the summer, it was not unusual to see Solent Enterprise (on a day trip to Cowes, Isle of Wight) and Portsmouth Queen (on a cruise around the Solent and Harbour) both passing Clarence Pier, off Southsea. Two days of special evening cruises occurred during The Festival of the Sea, when the Solent Enterprise and Gosport Queen did a special harbour cruise to view the tall ships and fireworks by night. Now cruises are generally operated by the Spirit of Portsmouth, which has moquette seating upstairs (also with seating with tables in the centre section) as well as a bar.

When there are no more cruises for a year, the Spirit of Portsmouth operates on the ferry service alongside the Spirit of Gosport. The latter vessel replaces the former when the former is out of service. Cruises were once the duty of the withdrawn vessels, the Southsea Queen and the Solent Enterprise.
