= RV Coastal Guardian =

English dive support vessel

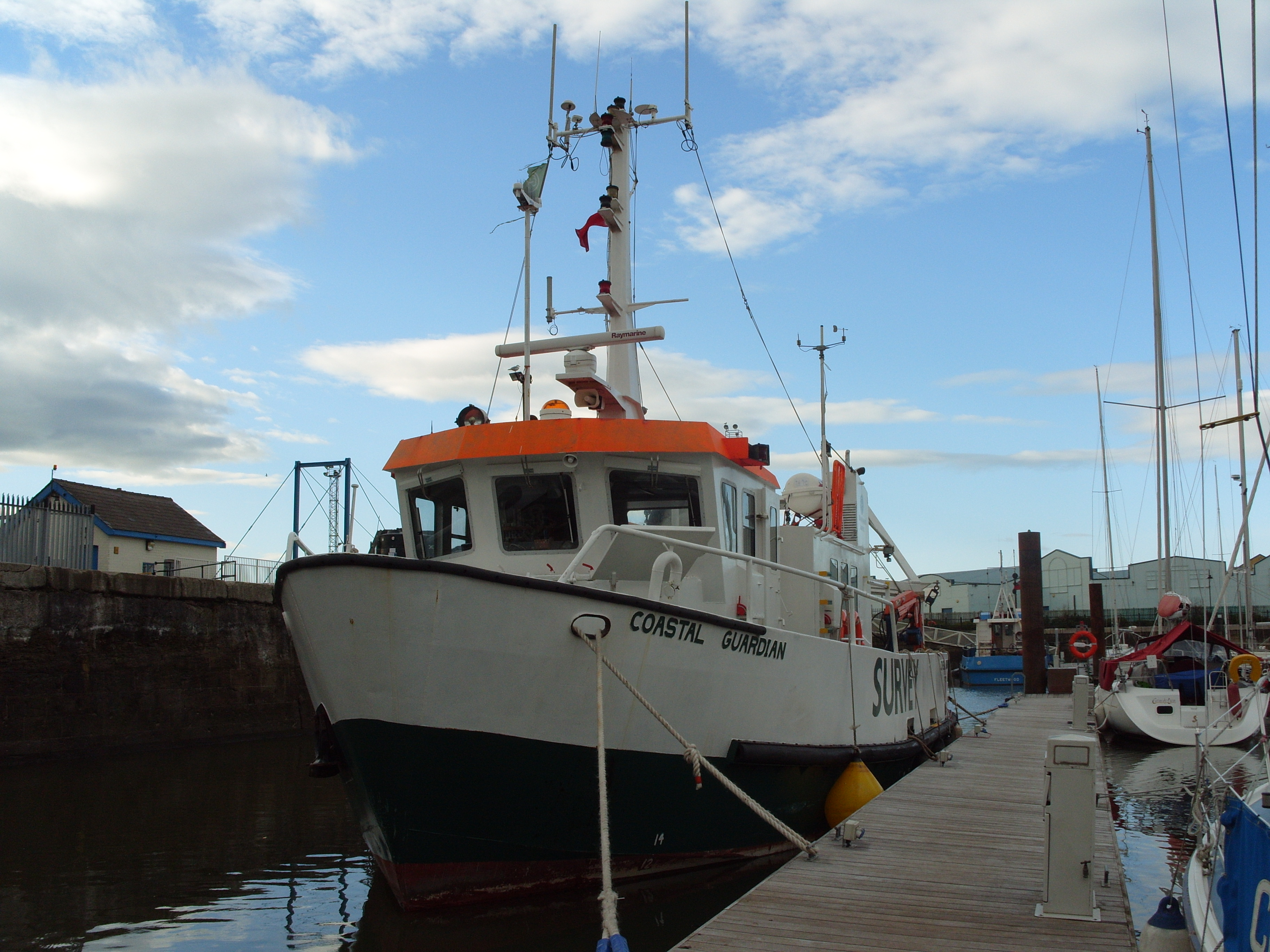
- Coastal Guardian in Fleetwood, 2008.

History
- Name: Coastal Guardian
- Owner: Environment Agency National Marine Service
- Operator: Environment Agency
- Port of registry: Liverpool, United Kingdom
- Builder: Abels Shipbuilders, Bristol, England (1992)
- Yard number: 746
- Launched: 1992
- Identification: MMSI number: 235087897
- Status: In service
- Notes: Specialises in Environmental Monitoring

General characteristics
- Class & type: DTp VIII Lloyds
- Tonnage: 46.6 gt
- Length: 16.45 m
- Beam: 5.50 m
- Draught: 1.80 m
- Installed power: 2 × 132kW
- Propulsion: 2 × Ford Sabre 180c turbocharged
- Speed: 10 knots (19 km/h; 12 mph)
- Crew: 1 Officer, 1 crew member, 6 scientists.

RV Coastal Guardian is a dive support vessel which is owned and operated by Shearwater Marine Services of Dunoon. Her work takes her around the UK, most notably the West Coast.

== History ==
In the late 1980s, Abels Shipbuilders began to construct a series of survey vessels for the Environment Agency. Vigilance was the first of four similar vessels and delivered by David Abels for work in the Bristol Channel in 1990. The follow on ships constructed were the Sea Vigil based on the South Coast, Coastal Guardian for the River Mersey and Water Guardian, based on the North East Coast, but spent some time in the Bristol Channel while the University of Plymouth chartered the Vigilance. Ranging from 42 to 71 tonnes, and 15.8 to 16.5 m (52 to 54 ft) in length, they are 10-knot (19 km/h; 12 mph) ships operated by the Agency's National Marine Service. Their complement includes scientists and each are fitted for survey activities such as taking seabed samples, trawling and water sampling as methods to monitor the area's coastline, including use of Meteorological sea surface temperature equipment on a tow fish when required. Vigilance was purchased by Aspect Surveys. As of September 2013 Coastal Guardian is based in Weymouth under new ownership working commercially as a survey/diving vessel primarily in support of The Shipwreck Project. Water Guardian is now owned by MPM North West in Maryport Cumbria, renamed Susan H and refitted in April 2014 the vessel is available for survey and dive hire.

Coastal Guardian is now owned and operated by Shearwater Marine Services in Dunoon, mainly used as diving support vessel

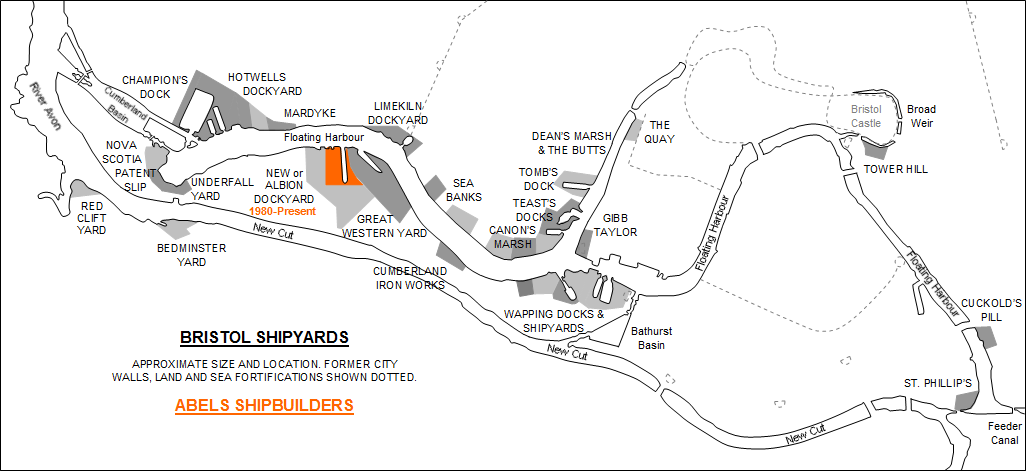
Previous Bristol Shipyards with Abels Shipbuilders highlighted in part of the former Charles Hill & Sons and Hilhouse Albion Yard.
