= Abels Shipbuilders =

British shipbuilder

Coordinates: 51.4484°N 2.6098°W

- Company type: Private company
- Industry: Shipbuilding, Boatbuilding
- Founded: 1980
- Defunct: 2016
- Headquarters: Bristol Harbour, England
- Key people: David Abels (founder)
- Number of employees: 35 (2001)

Abels Shipbuilders Ltd was a ship and boat builder in Bristol, England. In addition to boat building, the company branched out into architectural sculptures, tidal energy and marine restoration, but closed in 2016.

== Business ==
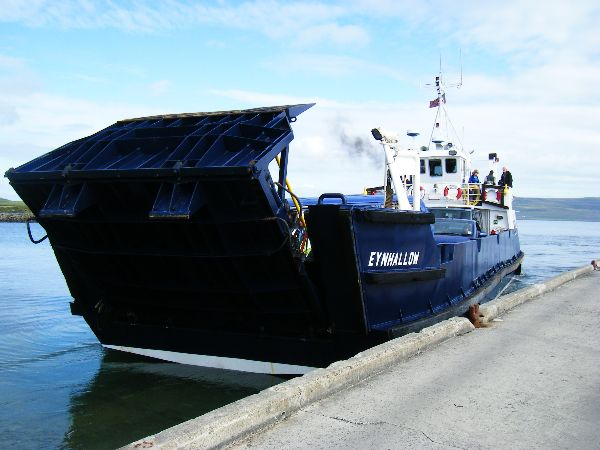
The Orkney Ferries vessel MV Eynhallow departing at Tingwall. Built in 1987 by Abels for 11 cars and 95 passengers.

Founded in 1980 by David Abels, the company took over part of the Albion Dockyard formerly occupied by Charles Hill & Sons who went out of business in 1977. The site includes the large covered dry dock originally built by Hilhouse in 1820, and has a capacity of 350 tonnes.

The company built a wide variety of vessels up to 250gt and 25 m (82 ft) in length in steel and aluminium, typically tugs, passenger and Roll-on/roll-off ferries, survey vessels, launches and work boats. Around 80% of orders were for UK customers although the company also delivered aluminium patrol and ambulance boats to Nigeria. The company also built Pero's Bridge (the horned foot bridge) which opened in 1999. Later work included a 180gt, 250-passenger catamaran for Clyde Marine and the rebuild of the Medway Queen for the Medway Queen Preservation Society.

=== Ferries ===
The company built ferries from at least 1985, when the 60-passenger Island Princess was delivered to Scottish owners, and she still operates as a whale watching boat off the Isle of Mull. Further ferry orders followed including the 29-metre (95 ft) Roll-on/roll-off ferry Eynhallow for Orkney Ferries in 1987 and the 19-metre (62 ft) Maid of the Forth for the Forth River in 1989.

In 1989, the Maid of the Islands (LOA15m, 130-person capacity) was built for Harvey's pleasure boats of Poole (the yellow boats of Poole); still in Poole today operating between Sandbanks and Brownsea Island for Brownsea Island Ferries. In 1991, a similar design was commissioned for Harvey's. Named Maid of the Lakelands, it is slightly bigger with a completely covered saloon, bar and open deck. It operates from Poole to Brownsea Island and from Poole Quay to Wareham for Brownsea Island Ferries.

In 1999, Maid of Poole (LOA23.5m 195-person capacity), was commissioned for Brownsea Island Ferries for the Poole Quay-Brownsea island service. In 2001 an exact copy of Maid of Poole (Abel's design) was commissioned by Brownsea Island Ferries to be built by Halmatic in Portsmouth. This vessel was called Maid of The Harbour.

In 2001, Abels secured a contract to build a twin-deck ferry for the Portsmouth Harbour Ferry Company. Shortly afterwards the company was awarded a follow-on contract for a second ferry. The first ship, Spirit of Gosport was delivered successfully, but the second, to be named Spirit of Portsmouth, was only partially constructed when the customer cancelled the order, and the unfinished hull remained at Abel's shipyard for many years. However, in 2016–17, the uncompleted hull was completed as a medical ferry for Vine Trust in South America, under the name Forth Hope.

The last ferry built was the Clyde Clipper for Clyde Marine and delivered in July 2009. She is a 125gt catamaran of 28 m (92 ft) length and 11 m (36 ft) beam and able to carry up to 250 passengers. Powered is supplied by two Doosan diesel engines and the vessel has a speed of around 12 knots (22 km/h; 14 mph).

=== Survey Vessels ===
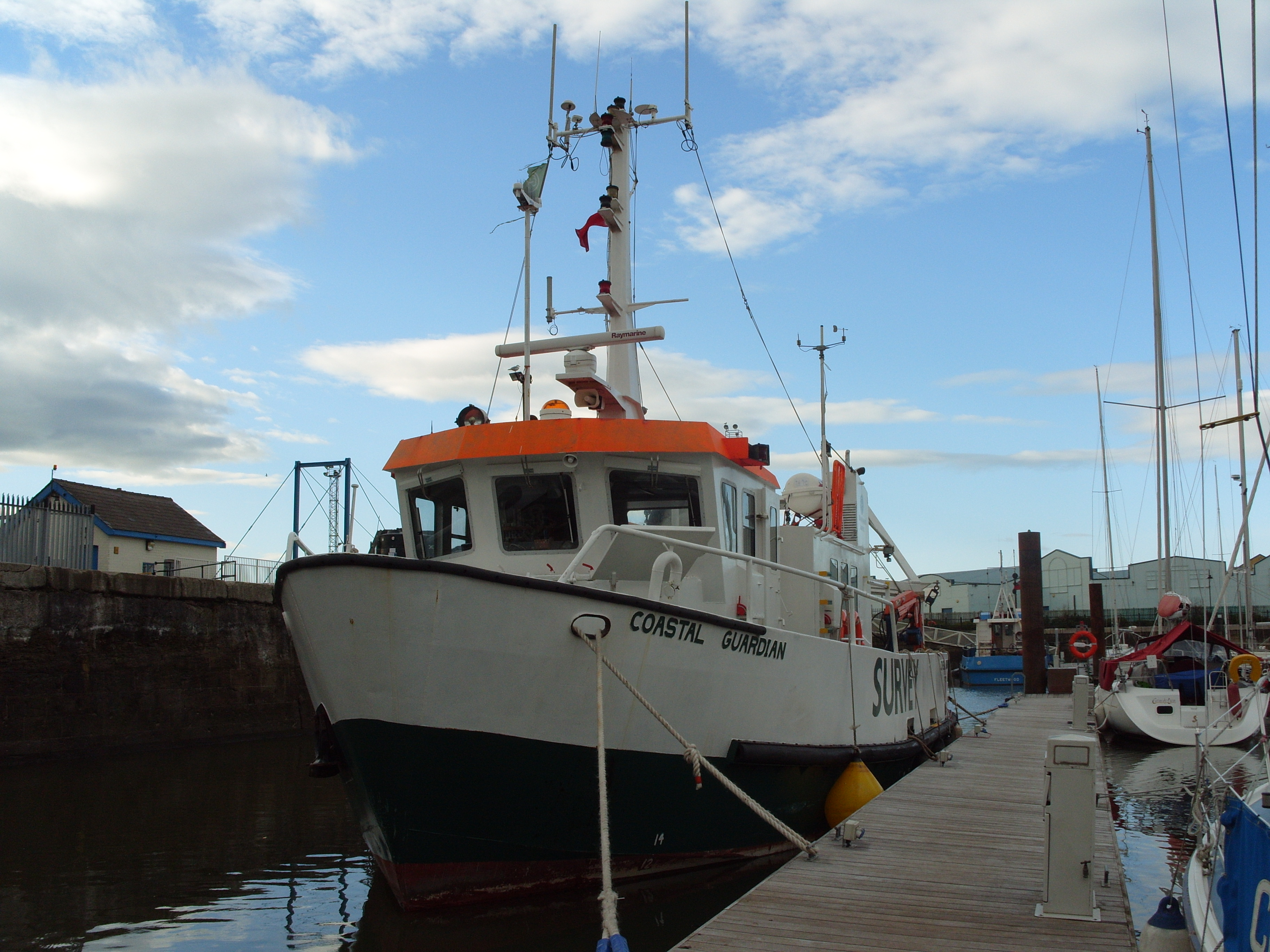
Coastal Guardian in Fleetwood, 2008.

In the late 1980s, Abels began to construct a series of survey vessels for the UK Environment Agency. Vigilance was the first of four similar vessels and delivered by Abels in 1990 for work in the Bristol Channel.

The follow-on ships constructed were the Sea Vigil based on the South Coast, Coastal Guardian for the Mersey and Water Guardian, based on the North East Coast, but spending some time in the Bristol Channel while Plymouth University chartered the Vigilance.

Ranging from 42 to 71gt and 15.8 to 16.5 m (52 to 54 ft) in length, they are 10 knots (19 km/h; 12 mph) ships operated by the Agency's National Marine Service. Their complement includes scientists and each are fitted for survey activities such as taking seabed samples, trawling and water sampling as methods to monitor the area's coastline, including use of Meteorological sea surface temperature equipment on a tow fish when required.

== Vessels built by Abels Shipbuilders ==
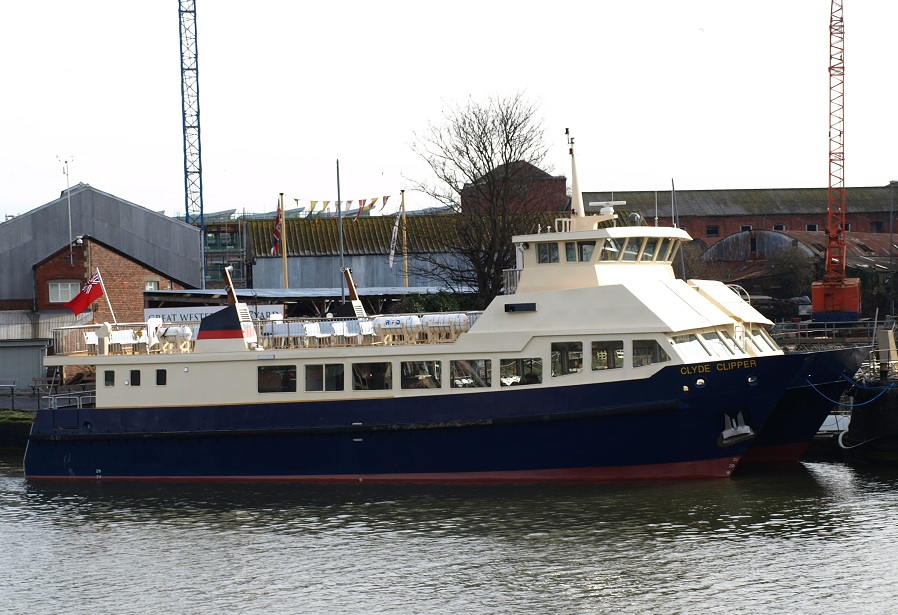
The Clyde Clipper catamaran fitting out at Abels during February 2009. Capacity is up to 250 passengers.

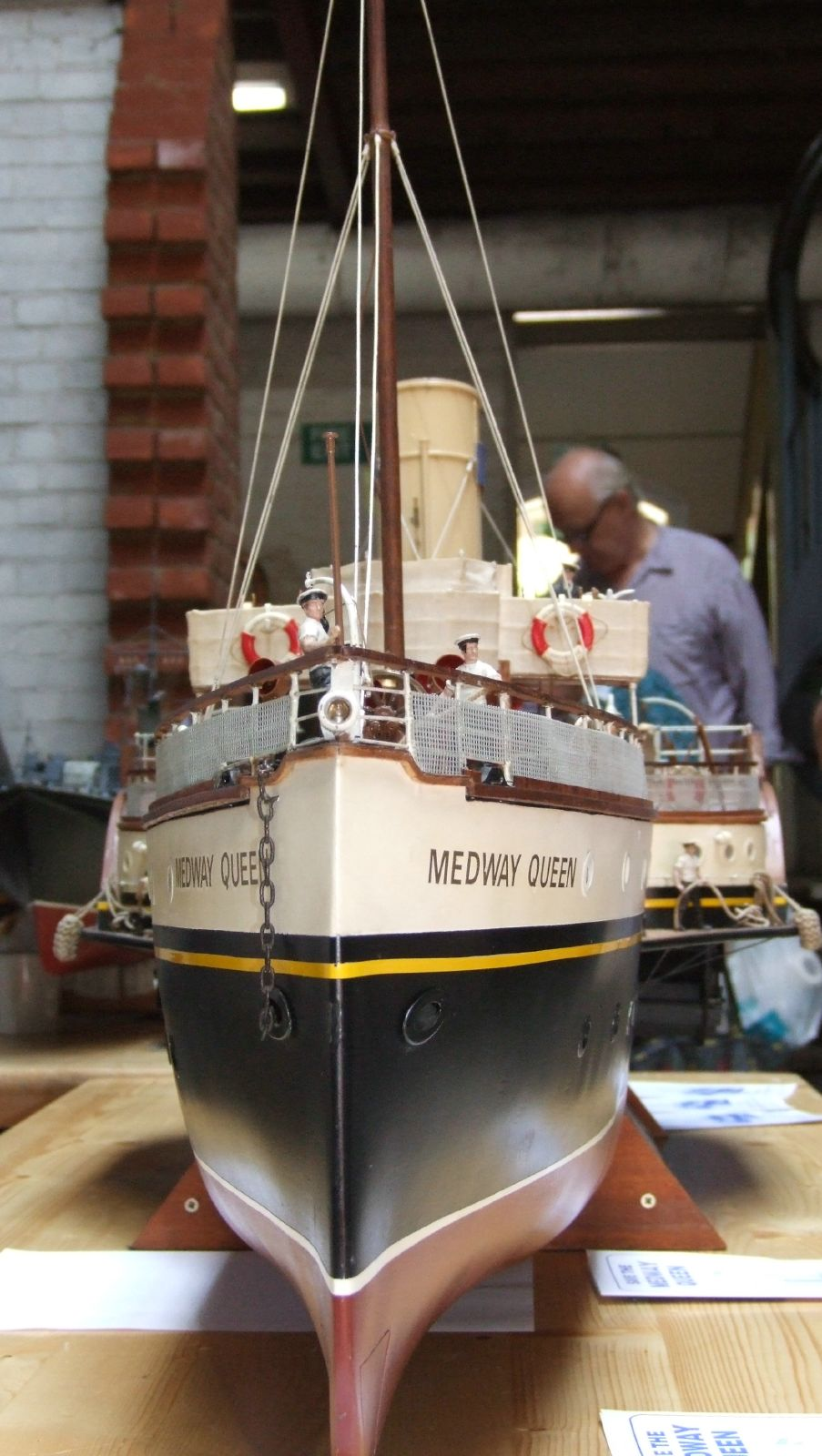
A model of the Medway Queen. The ship was rebuilt at Abels under Heritage Lottery Funding.

Vessels built by Abels Shipbuilders in Bristol include:

- Maria McLoughlin (1981). 500 hp (370 kW) steel tug.
- Sarah McLoughlin (1981). 500 hp (370 kW) steel tug.
- Island Princess (1985). 50 ft (15 m) 60 seat passenger ferry.
- MV Eynhallow (1987). 104gt Ro-Ro vehicle and passenger ferry.
- Surta (1988). 42 ft (13 m) steam passenger vessel.
- Vigilance (1989). 42gt environmental survey vessel.
- Maid of the Forth (1989). 70gt 225-seat passenger ferry.
- Maid of the Islands (1989). 130-seat passenger ferry.
- Sea Vigil (1991). 55gt survey vessel.
- Avon Monarch (1991). 75-seat passenger vessel.
- Maid of the Lakeland’s (1991). 130-seat passenger ferry
- Coastal Guardian (1992). 74gt survey vessel.
- Water Guardian (1992). 51gt survey vessel.
- Sir William Pulteney (1993). 85-seat passenger ferry.
- Impulse (1994). 52gt steel pusher tug.
- Georgina (1995). 80.1 ft (24.4 m) motor boat.
- The Georgian (1995). 93.5 ft (28.5 m) motor boat.
- Lenie (1997). 121gt multi-purpose tug.
- PAD.42 to PAD.51 (1999). 7.62 m (25.0 ft), 35 knots (65 km/h; 40 mph) aluminium-hulled Nigerian police launches.
- Maid of Poole (1999). 195-seat Passenger Ferry.
- Spirit of Gosport (2001). 300gt passenger ferry.
- Beauchamp (2001). 80 ft (24 m) floating classroom vessel.
- Spirit of Portsmouth (2002). 300gt passenger ferry (unfinished), renamed Forth Hope (finished), (2017). 320 gt medical ferry.
- Faoilean (2002). 58gt fish farming vessel.
- Corrine Marin (2004). Floating café and restaurant for Arbi'n'Tap. Due to a contractual dispute Dave Abel ceased trading after going into receivership following the build of this ship.
- Leanne McLoughlin (2005). Line running vessel.
- Noleen McLoughlin (2005). Line running vessel.
- Clay Barge No 8 (2005). 39.5 ft (12.0 m) motor barge.
- Clyde Clipper (2009). 125gt catamaran ferry.
- Seagreen (2010). 304 gt Work vessel for the French transport & utility company Veolia.
- Medway Queen (2010). Rebuild of the 180 ft (55 m) iron paddle steamer.
- West Country Schooner (2011). 60 t topsail schooner

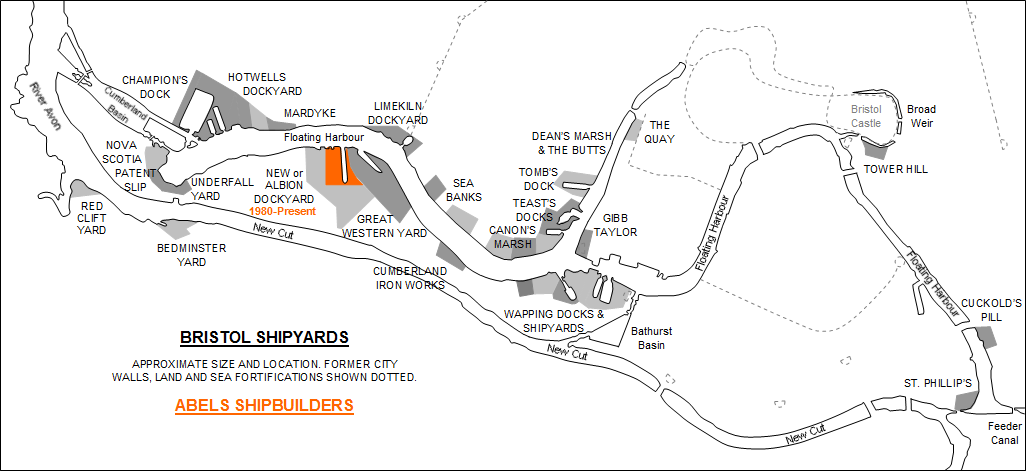
Previous Bristol Shipyards with Abels Shipbuilders highlighted in part of the former Charles Hill & Sons and Hilhouse Albion Yard.
