= The Vine Trust =

Scotland-based charity

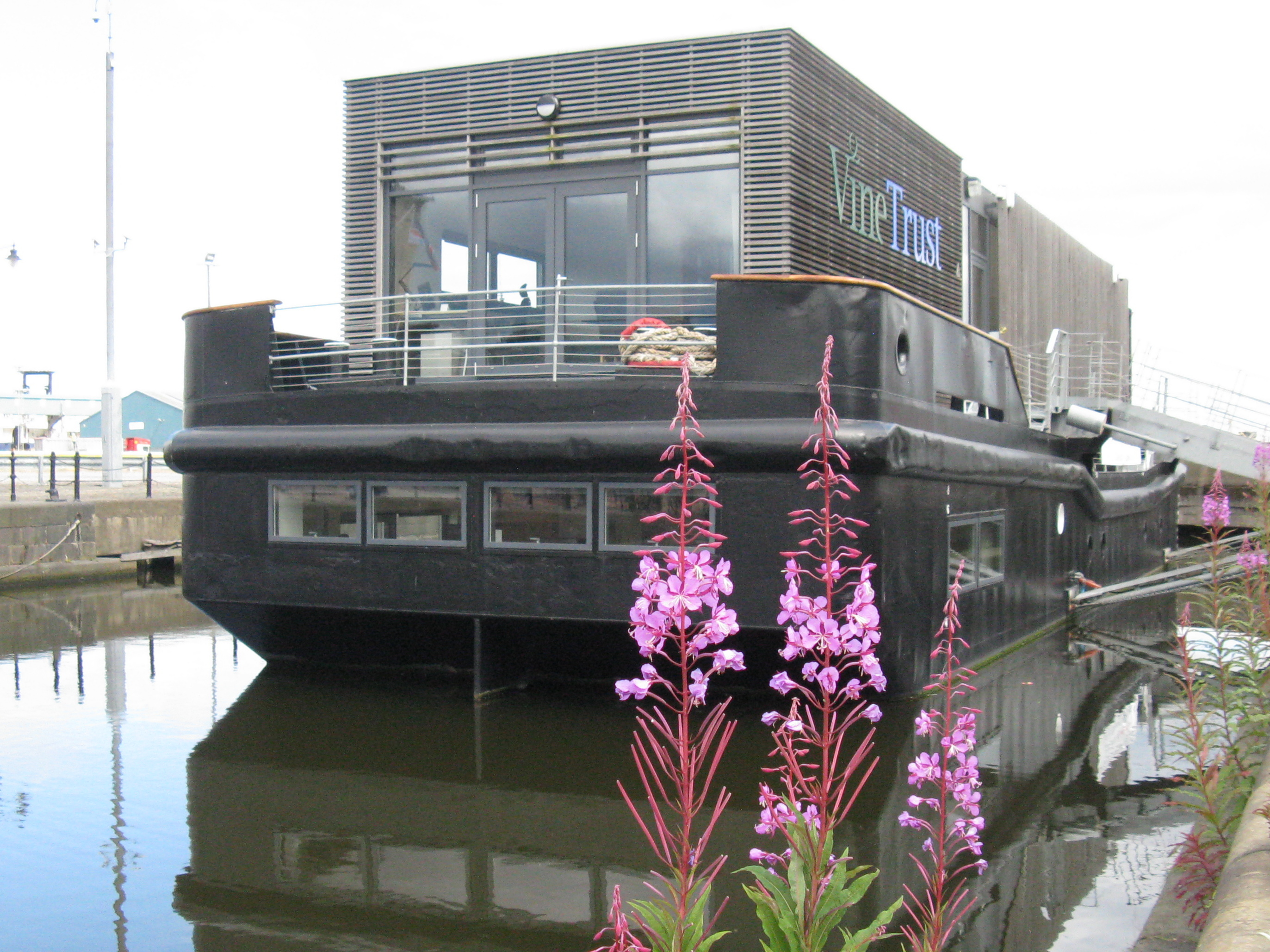
The Vine Trust's headquarters, in Leith Docks

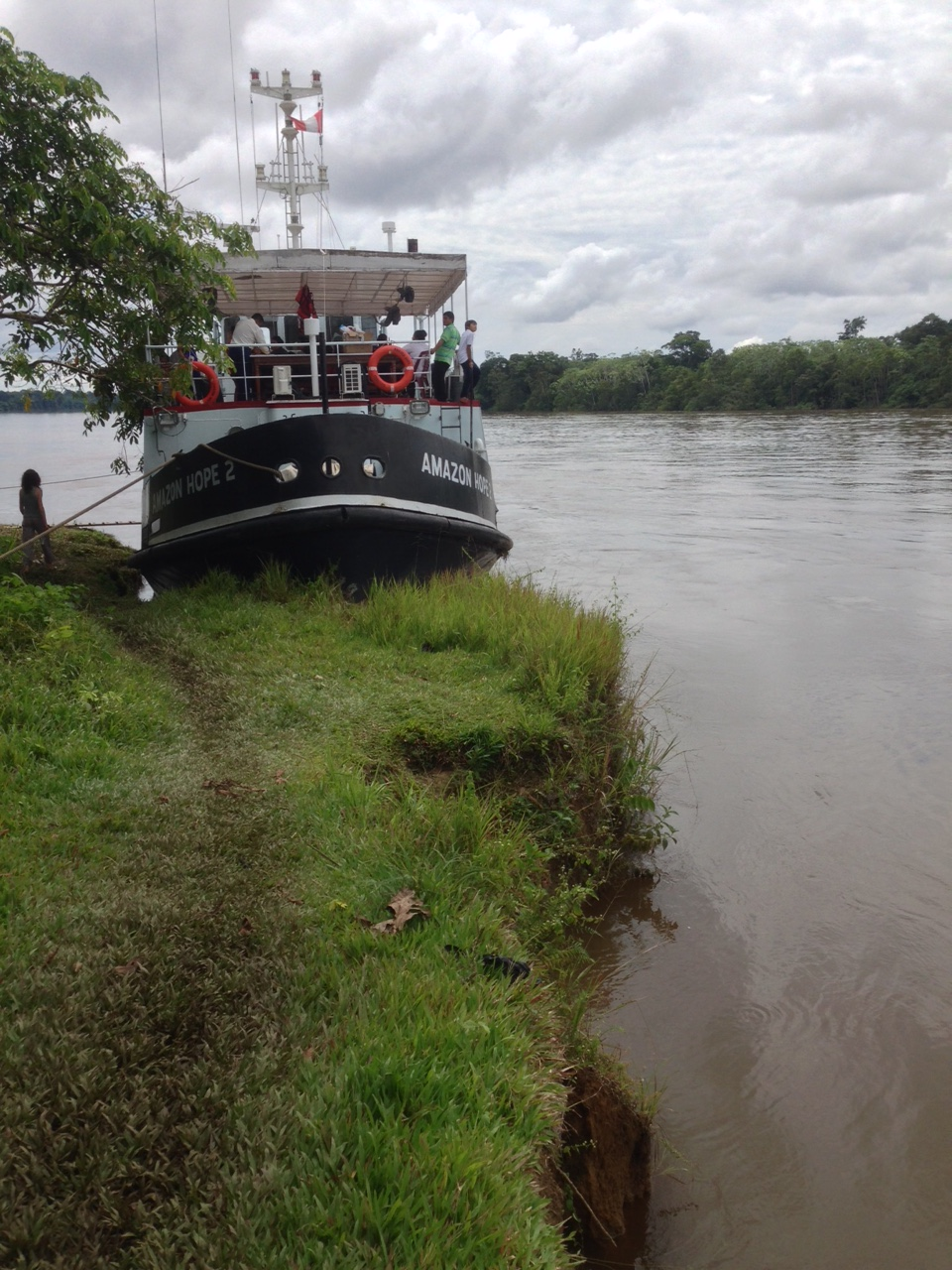
Amazon Hope 2, moored outside a rural village in Loreto, Peru

The Vine Trust is an international charity based in Leith, Scotland. It is involved in volunteer programs and supporting the delivery of medical projects, principally the Amazon Hope project in Peru and the Jubilee Hope project in Tanzania. A common thread in both projects is the use of medical ships to deliver health care to remote communities. The Vine Trust has a wholly owned subsidiary, Programa Médico Esperanza Amazónica del Perú (PMEAP), through which it operates in Peru.

The trust was established in 1985, founded by Albert Bogle, a minister of the Church of Scotland and former Moderator of the General Assembly of that church. The Vine Trust has the patronage of Anne, Princess Royal.

The charity's headquarters are on the former naval oil barge 1713(U), converted into offices and conference facilities in 2011, and moored in Leith Docks. Later in 2011 the barge was renamed Tom Dunn, in honour of the Trust's late volunteer naval architect.

== Projects in Peru ==
Amazon Hope is a project based in Loreto in northern Peru, run by PMEAP. The project operates two medical ships – Amazon Hope 2 and Forth Hope. The medical ships make monthly trips along the Amazon and other rivers in Loreto to provide medical assistance to rural riverside communities. The project plans to also look at the possibility of supporting public health, health education and safe water in partnership with the regional and national governments.

== Projects in Tanzania ==
Jubilee Hope is a project based in the Lake Victoria area of Tanzania, working in association with local health authorities and the Africa Inland Church Tanzania (AICT). The project operates a medical ship, the Jubilee Hope (MMSI: 236111935), delivering health care to remote island communities on the lake. It is Gibraltar flagged vessel, formerly operated by the Royal Navy. It will feature in a four-part STV documentary.

Other projects in Tanzania include a house building program to build homes for children who have lost parents to HIV/AIDS and malaria. They offer opportunities for schools to send an expedition party of students in S5/6 out to Tanzania to help with building process
