= William Hewitt (minister) =

William Currie Hewitt (born 1951) is a minister of the Church of Scotland and is a former moderator of the General Assembly of the Church of Scotland (2009–2010).

He was born on 6 April 1951 in Kilmarnock, Ayrshire, Scotland and educated at Kilmarnock Academy and the University of Glasgow. He graduated with the degree of Bachelor of Divinity from the University of Glasgow in 1974.

He was minister at Westburn Parish Church in Greenock, Scotland until 2012 and was the first serving minister of a church in Greenock ever to become Moderator. He was ordained in 1977, whilst serving as Assistant Minister at Castlehill Parish Church in Ayr. In 1978 he became minister at Elderslie Parish Church, Johnstone, serving for 16 years before moving to St Luke's Parish Church, Greenock, in 1994. In 2006 St Luke's united with neighbouring St George's North Church to become Westburn Church. His latest role is in interim ministry, currently (2012) serving as Clerk pro tem to the Presbytery of Glasgow.

He has also served as Moderator of the Presbytery of Greenock and the first Moderator of the successor Presbytery of Greenock and Paisley. In 1993, Mr Hewitt was appointed to the General Assembly's Board of Practice and Procedure where he served for 8 years, becoming Convener of the General Assembly Arrangements Committee and Convener of the Business Committee of the General Assembly. Mr Hewitt has also been a member of the Church of Scotland's Assembly Council and of the Support and Services Committee.

He is married to Moira; they have a daughter and two sons. Full name and title: The Very Reverend William Currie Hewitt BD DipPS.

== See also ==
- List of moderators of the General Assembly of the Church of Scotland

Religious titles
Preceded by David Lunan	Moderator of the General Assembly of the Church of Scotland; 2009–2010	Succeeded by John C. Christie
