= Spirit of Gosport =

MV Spirit of Gosport
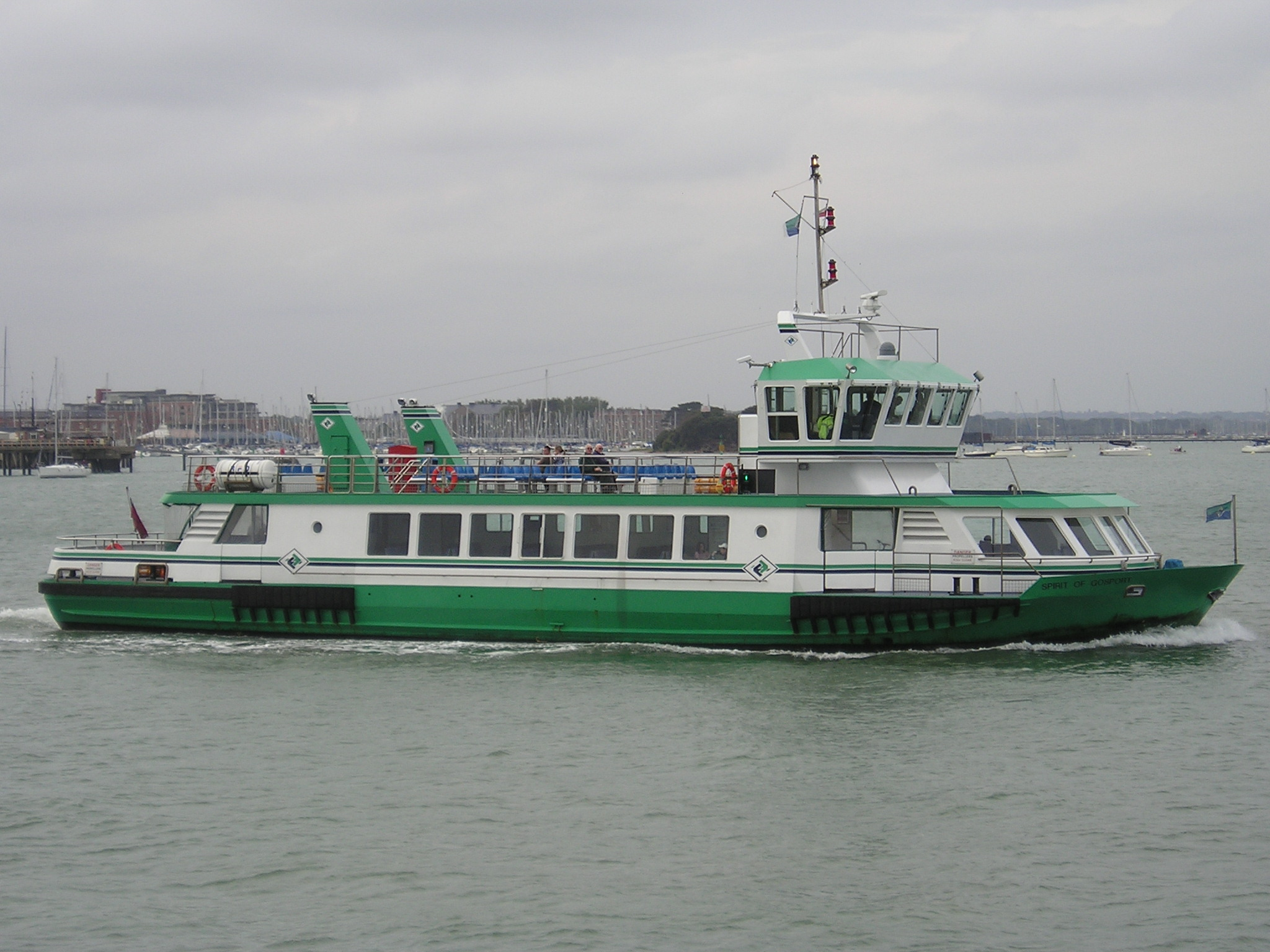
- Spirit of Gosport crossing Portsmouth Harbour

History
- Name: Spirit of Gosport
- Owner: Gosport Ferry
- Builder: Abels Shipbuilders
- Launched: 2001
- Identification: IMO number: 8972089

General characteristics
- Length: 32.60 metres (107.0 ft)
- Beam: 10.20 metres (33.5 ft)
- Draught: 1.9 metres (6 ft 3 in)
- Installed power: 318 hp (237 kW) Scania DI9 diesel
- Speed: 10 knots (19 km/h; 12 mph)
- Capacity: 300 passengers
- Crew: 3

Spirit of Gosport is a vessel that operates the Gosport Ferry service, It was built by Abels Shipbuilders in Bristol.

== History ==
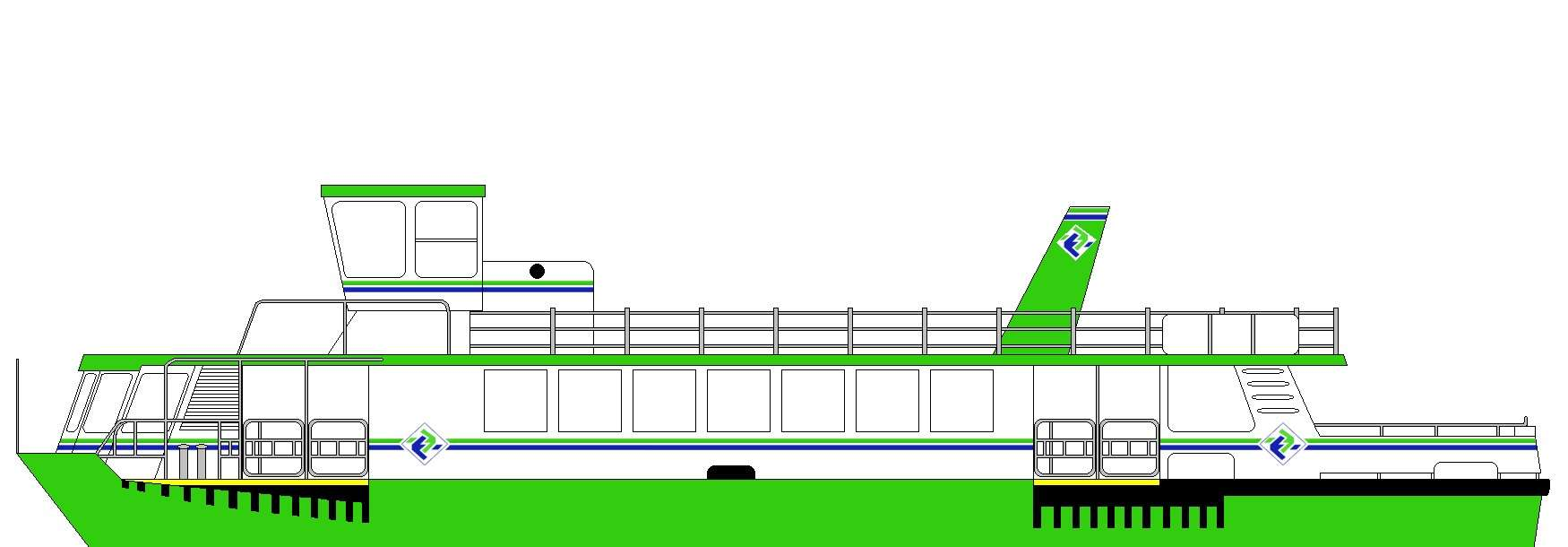

Spirit of Gosport was built in 2001 to replace Portsmouth Queen on ferry duties. However, the company also wanted to replace Solent Enterprise, which operated cruise duties. The vessel was hardly used for the first few months and both existing ferries were kept in service. In 2003, she finally replaced Solent Enterprise on cruise duties. This continued until 2005, when a brand new vessel was purchased to replace Spirit of Gosport on cruise duties.

Shortly after being awarded the contract for Spirit of Gosport, Abels were awarded a follow-on contract for a second ferry, to be known as Spirit of Portsmouth. However this vessel was only partially constructed when the ferry company cancelled the order, and the unfinished hull remained at Abel's shipyard for many years, before being completed as a medical missionary ferry, the Forth Hope. This ship should not be confused with the subsequent Spirit of Portsmouth that now operates alongside the Spirit of Gosport.

== Characteristics ==
The Spirit of Gosport is 32.60 metres (107.0 ft) in length and has a beam of 10.20 metres (33.5 ft) and a draught of 1.9 metres (6 ft 3 in). She has a service speed of 10 knots (19 km/h; 12 mph) and a capacity of 300 passengers and 3 crew.
