= John Christie (minister) =

The Right Reverend John Christie
- Moderator of the General Assembly
- Church: Church of Scotland
- In office: 2010 to 2011
- Predecessor: William Hewitt
- Successor: David Arnott

Orders
- Ordination: 1990

Personal details
- Born: John Cairns Christie; 9 July 1947 (age 79)
- Denomination: Presbyterianism
- Occupation: Church minister

John Cairns Christie (born 9 July 1947) is a minister of the Church of Scotland. He was Moderator of the General Assembly of the Church of Scotland for 2010-2011.

== Early life and education ==
Christie was born in Glasgow on 9 July 1947 and lived in Helensburgh as a child. He was educated at Hermitage Academy, Helensburgh (1959-1966), the University of Strathclyde, Paisley College and the University of Glasgow.

His early career was as a scientific assistant at Royal Ordnance Factory Bishopton in the late 1960s, then as a school teacher at Albert Secondary School, Springburn, Glasgow (in Biology and Chemistry) in the mid-1970s, eventually becoming principal teacher of science at Tiree High School in 1978 before moving to Inverness in 1984. Whilst on the island of Tiree Mr Christie was ordained an elder of the Church of Scotland.

== Ordained ministry ==
In 1989 he graduated with a degree of Bachelor of Divinity (BD) degree from the University of Glasgow and was licensed as a Probationer for the Ministry. He served as a Probationer at Mosspark Parish Church, Glasgow. In 1990, Mr Christie was ordained and inducted as minister at Hyndland Parish Church in the Presbytery of Glasgow where he served for 14 years.

Christie was called to Interim Ministry in 2004 — a specialist ministry helping congregations that have faced difficulties. As of 2009 he is serving at St Andrew's Parish Church, West Kilbride and also visits the Scots Kirk, Lausanne in the Church of Scotland's Presbytery of Europe.

Christie has also served as Convener of four Church of Scotland General Assembly Boards and Committees (the Safeguarding Committee, the Board of Parish Education, the Joint Boards Committee on the Safety & Protection of Children and the Forgiveness & Proportionality Working Group). Mr Christie also served as Vice Convener of the Kirk's Board of World Mission's Middle East and North Africa Committee.

=== Moderator ===
The shortlist of nominees for the role of Moderator were made public in early October 2009. Alongside Christie, William D. Brown, of Murrayfield, John L. McPake from Mossneuk in East Kilbride, and C. Peter White, of Sandyford, Glasgow were nominated. Christie's selection as the final nominee was announced on 27 October 2009. Christie formally took up his appointment on 20 May 2010. Upon becoming Moderator his full title became the Right Reverend John Cairns Christie BSc BD.

== Personal life ==
In 1972 Christie married Elizabeth and they had a daughter, Margaret. Elizabeth died in 1993. In 1995 Mr Christie married Annette, a Scottish Indoor Bowling Internationalist.

== See also ==
- List of moderators of the General Assembly of the Church of Scotland

Religious titles
| Preceded by William Hewitt | Moderator of the General Assembly of the Church of Scotland; 2010–2011 | Succeeded by A. David K. Arnott |
