= MV Eynhallow =

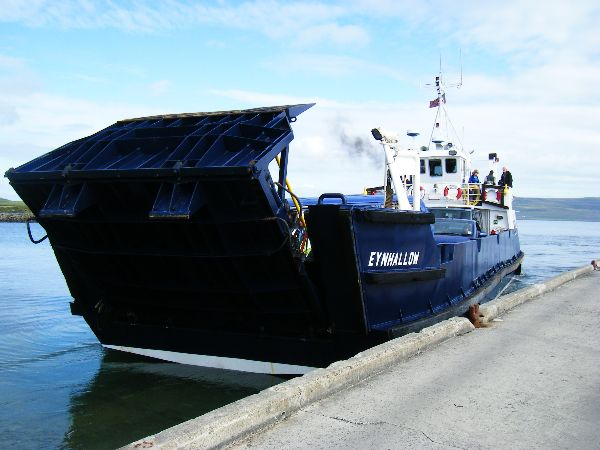
- MV Eynhallow at Tingwall.

History

United Kingdom
- Name: MV Eynhallow
- Owner: Orkney Islands Council
- Operator: Orkney Ferries
- Port of registry: Kirkwall
- Builder: Abels Shipbuilders, Bristol
- Completed: 1987
- Identification: MMSI Number: 235019174; IMO number: 8960880; Callsign: MGRN9

General characteristics
- Class & type: MCA Class VIA/VI
- Type: Ro-Ro Vehicle & Passenger Ferry
- Length: 28.8 m (94.5 ft)
- Beam: 7 m (23.0 ft)
- Draft: 1.5 m (4.9 ft)
- Installed power: 2 x 220.5kW
- Speed: 10.5 knots (19.4 km/h; 12.1 mph)
- Capacity: 50/95 passengers; 10 cars or approximately 40 tonnes
- Crew: 3/4

MV Eynhallow is a Ro-Ro vehicle ferry operated by Orkney Ferries.

== History ==
MV Eynhallow was built by Abels Shipbuilders in Bristol in 1987.

== Service ==
MV Eynhallow is normally used on the Rousay, Egilsay and Wyre service.
