= Albert Bogle =

Minister of the Church of Scotland

The Very Reverend Albert Bogle
- Moderator of the General Assembly
- Church: Church of Scotland
- In office: 2012 to 2013
- Predecessor: David Arnott
- Successor: Lorna Hood
- Other posts: Minister of St Andrew's Parish Church, Bo'ness (1981–2015)

Orders
- Ordination: 1981

Personal details
- Born: Albert Orr Bogle; 1949 (age 76–77) Glasgow, Scotland
- Denomination: Presbyterianism
- Education: University of Glasgow; University of Edinburgh

Albert Orr Bogle (born 3 February 1949) is a former minister of the Church of Scotland. On 25 October 2011 he was nominated to be Moderator of the General Assembly of the Church of Scotland for 2012-2013; he was duly formally elected as Moderator on 19 May 2012 - the first day of the General Assembly's week-long annual session.

== Background ==
He was born in Glasgow on 3 February 1949, son of James and Margaret Bogle and was educated at Woodside Secondary School, Glasgow (1962–67). Following a career in banking (prior to 1975), he studied for a Bachelor of Divinity degree at the University of Glasgow.

== Ministry ==
Bogle was licensed by the Presbytery of Glasgow in June 1980. Prior to his ordination, he spent a year as Probationer at Cardonald Parish Church, Glasgow (1980–81). He also studied part-time (1996–1998) at the University of Edinburgh for a postgraduate Master of Theology degree.

Bogle was ordained as a minister of the Church of Scotland on 16 September 1981 and inducted to St Andrew's Parish Church in Bo’ness, Scotland. He was appointed a National Evangelist (part-time) in Jan 1998.

In 2015 he demitted his charge at Bo'ness to become a Pioneer Minister of Sanctuary First www.sanctuaryfirst.org.uk. He continues to pioneer this worldwide ministry. He is married to Martha; the couple have a son and daughter.

As well as his ministry in Bo’ness, he has served the General Assembly of the Church of Scotland in various roles since 1983. These have included membership of the Panel of Worship to being Convener of the "Church without Walls" Planning Group from 2004 to 2009. As of 2011, he is a member of the Future Strategy Group of the Church of Scotland's World Mission Council. He is known as an innovator, particularly in promoting the use of new technology within worship. He is the founder and leader of Sanctuary First, an innovative App promoting daily worship and prayer. He is a director and founder member of Sanctus Media, a not for profit production company seeking to serve the wider Christian community and the Charitable sector.

In 2012-2013, he became the Moderator of the Church of Scotland. However, following his year, at the 2013 General Assembly, he proposed a compromise between the evangelical and liberal wings of the Church of Scotland, much to the disappointment of many evangelicals both within the denomination, and those out with it as well.

He demitted his charge from St Andrew's Bo'ness in December 2015. He was appointed in 2016 by the Presbytery of Falkirk as Pioneer Minister of Sanctuary First an online worshipping community. In 2017 he was invited by the Princess Royal, to be her chaplain during her appointment, by the Queen as Lord High Commissioner to the General Assembly of the Church of Scotland. He retired from Church of Scotland ministry on 31 October 2023, but continues to serve as Chairman of the board of Sanctuary First. He now r

== The Vine Trust ==
Bogle was the founder and is the chairman, of The Vine Trust, which was established in 1985. The Vine Trust aims to help some of the poorest children and communities around the world. The charity's Amazon Hope Project provides a health service for around 100,000 patients every year. The Vine Trust has the patronage of Anne, Princess Royal. In October 2014 the Trust made history by delivering an ex Mod Fleet Tender to Lake Victoria to provide primary medical care to some of the poorest people in the world. The Jubilee Hope left the River Clyde in Glasgow in January 2014 and finally arrived on Lake Victoria in September 2014 It was launched by the Princess Royal on 2 October 2014 to begin a work that will have the potential to reach 2 million patients within the next twenty years.

== Personal life ==
He married Martha Baird Craig Goldie on 31 August 1977. He has two children, Sarah and Stephen. After retirement, he now lives in Stirling and attends Stirling: North Church where he still routinely preaches.

Religious titles
Preceded by David Arnott	Moderator of the General Assembly of the Church of Scotland; 2012–2013	Succeeded by Lorna Hood
