= David Arnott (minister) =

Moderator of the General Assembly of the Church of Scotland

The Very Reverend David Arnott
- Moderator of the General Assembly
- Church: Church of Scotland
- In office: 2011 to 2012
- Predecessor: John Christie
- Successor: Albert Bogle
- Other post: Minister of Hope Park Church, St Andrews (1996–2010)

Orders
- Ordination: 1971

Personal details
- Born: Andrew David Keltie Arnott Dunfermline, Fife, Scotland
- Denomination: Presbyterianism
- Occupation: Church Minister

Andrew David Keltie Arnott is a retired minister of the Church of Scotland who was the Moderator of the General Assembly of the Church of Scotland from 2011 to 2012.

== Background ==
David Arnott was born in Dunfermline, Fife. He went to George Watson's College in Edinburgh. He is a graduate of the University of St Andrews and the University of Edinburgh.

== Career ==
David Arnott was ordained in 1971. His first charge was Stobhill Parish Church in Gorebridge, Midlothian. He soon oversaw the union of all three congregations in the town into a single Gorebridge Parish Church.

He was minister at Hope Park Church, St Andrews from 1996 until his retirement in 2010. Since 2005 Hope Park Church has also been linked with nearby Strathkinness Parish Church. Before moving to St Andrews, he was minister at Netherlee Parish Church in the Presbytery of Glasgow, where he also served as part-time chaplain to Barlinnie Prison.

As well as three consecutive parish appointments, he has held several high-profile national positions with the Church of Scotland. He was formerly Convener of the Assembly Arrangements Committee and was the Business Convener of the Assembly. He was formerly a Senior Director of Assessment Conferences for those applying to become ministers of the Church of Scotland. He was a former Convener of the Committee on Education for Ministry and he also served the Board of Ministry as joint convener for one year.

During 2013, the Very Reverend David Arnott served as Locum Minister to the parish of St. Andrews Church of Scotland in Lisbon, Portugal.

He was a regular guest on BBC Radio Scotland's Thought for the Day.

== Moderator of the General Assembly ==
In October 2010, David Arnott was shortlisted, along with Albert O. Bogle and C. Peter White. On 27 October 2010, David Arnott was formally nominated by the committee to Nominate the Moderator. As Moderator-designate, he still needed to be formally elected at the opening of the General Assembly in May 2011. Technically, it would have been possible for the General Assembly to decline to elect the Moderator-designate; in practice the Moderator-designate is invariably elected by acclaim.

Upon election as Moderator, his formal title became the Right Reverend David Arnott MA BD. After his Moderatorial term ended in 2012, his title became the "Very Reverend".

== Family ==
He is married to Rosemary, they have three children and eight grandchildren. After retiring from his charge in 2010, he and his wife now live in Peebles.

== See also ==
- General Assembly of the Church of Scotland
- List of moderators of the General Assembly of the Church of Scotland

Religious titles
Preceded by John Christie	Moderator of the General Assembly of the Church of Scotland; 2011–2012	Succeeded by Albert Bogle
