= Harbour Spirit =

MV Harbour Spirit
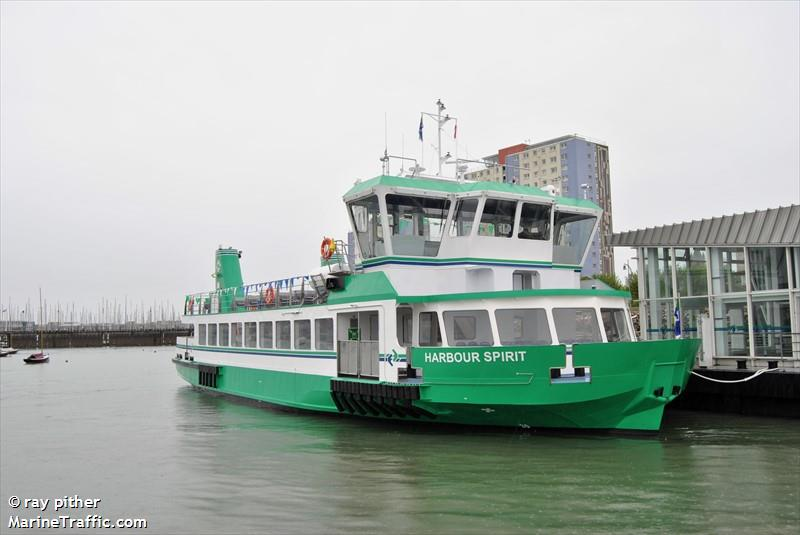
- Harbour Spirit at Gosport

History
- Name: Harbour Spirit
- Owner: Gosport Ferry
- Launched: 2014
- In service: 2015
- Identification: IMO number: 9741669; MMSI number: 235109129; Callsign: 2IES4

General characteristics
- Length: 29.67 metres (97.3 ft)
- Beam: 10.20 metres (33.5 ft)
- Draught: 2.1 metres (6 ft 11 in)
- Speed: 10 knots (19 km/h; 12 mph)
- Capacity: 300 passengers
- Crew: 3 or 4

Harbour Spirit is a vessel that opeartes the Gosport Ferry service. It was built by Tehnomont Shipyard of Pula in Croatia.

== History ==
Harbour Spirit was launched in November 2014. After a month of sea trials in Croatian waters, the Harbour Spirit was loaded onto the heavy lift ship Amoenitas for the journey to Gosport, and was delivered on March 11 2015. She entered service in July of that year.

== Characteristics ==
The Harbour Spirit is 29.67 metres (97.3 ft) in length and has a beam of 10.20 metres (33.5 ft) and a draught of 2.1 metres (6 ft 11 in). She has a service speed of 10 knots (19 km/h; 12 mph) and a capacity of 300 passengers. She carries either 3 or 4 crew depending on the nature of the voyage.
