= Hope Park Church, St Andrews =

Church in Fife, Scotland

Coordinates: 56.340663°N 2.799711°W

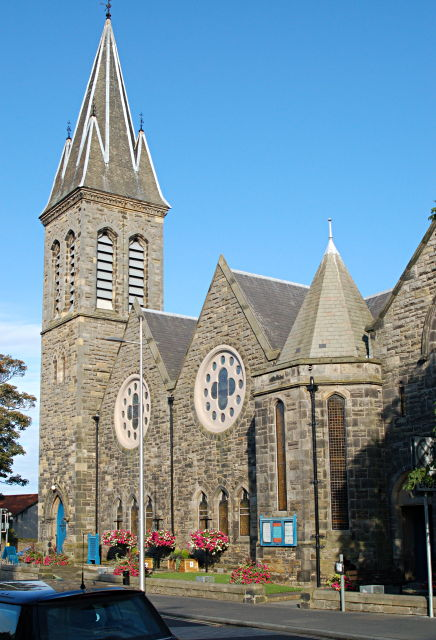
Hope Park Church, St Andrews, in 2008

Hope Park Church in St Andrews, Fife, is a congregation of the Church of Scotland.

== Building ==
The current building, by Peddie & Kinnear, was completed in 1865. It has notable stained glass windows and an unusual canopy above the pulpit.

== History ==
The congregation can trace its origins back to the Associate Presbytery (led by the dissident Stirling minister Ebenezer Erskine), which broke away from the Church of Scotland in 1733. In 1738 a Kirk Session of a local congregation (initially worshipping outdoors) was recognised by the Associate Presbytery.

From 1749 onwards the congregation have had meeting places in St Andrews - first in an old barn in Imrie's Close (now 136 South Street) then from 1774 in Burghers' Close (now 141 South Street), from 1827 in a purpose-built chapel in North Street (no. 52) then from 1865 in the present building. The name Hope Park was suggested by the then minister the Rev. James Black.

As the Associate Presbytery developed (and divisions emerged), the congregation – based on the Voluntary rather than Establishment principle – became associated with the Burghers, which in 1820 became the United Secession Church, which in turn became the United Presbyterian Church in 1847, which merged with the Free Church in 1900 to become the United Free Church of Scotland, which united with the Church of Scotland in 1929.

The BBC radio series 'Sunday Half-Hour' was broadcast on 18 June 1950, conducted by Cedric Thorpe Davie (1913-1983), and 'Children's Hour' on 2 December 1952, conducted by the then Minister the Rev. Wilfred Herbert Hulbert (1906-1968) who was appointed in 1947. The Organist during this period was Edward MacMahon.

Hope Park Church is now part of St Mark's parish church. Website: www.stmarksparishchurch.org

== Ministry ==
The charge is currently vacant. From 2011 until 2023, the minister was the Reverend Allan McCafferty BSc BD, who was previously minister at Kirkwall East Parish Church, Orkney. He succeeded the Reverend David Arnott, who was minister from 1996 until 2010. On 27 October 2010 Mr Arnott was nominated to be the Moderator of the General Assembly of the Church of Scotland for 2011–2012.

== See also ==
- List of Church of Scotland parishes
- For a detailed account of the story of Hope Park Church, from 1738 to 1973, refer to "The Story of Hope Park Church, St Andrews, A Concise History" by T. T. Fordyce (an elder of Hope Park).
