= Gosport Queen =

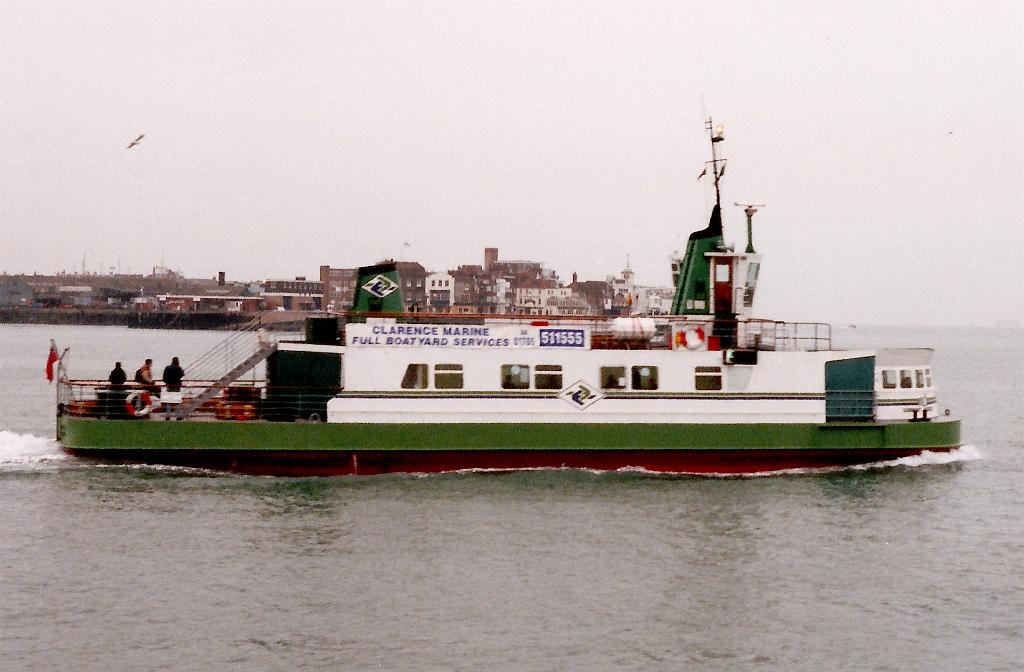
The Gosport Queen in January 1997

Gosport Queen was a vessel owned by the Gosport Ferry Company. It was built by John I Thornycroft & Company of Woolston, Southampton.

== History ==
The Gosport Queen was built in 1966 to the exact design to the Portsmouth Queen and was delivered in a green and white livery. Later, it was repainted into the now standard Gosport Ferry colours. It was the last vessel to be built by John I Thornycroft & Company in Woolston, Southampton.

The Gosport Queen was sold to London based London Party Boats in January 2017 for use on the River Thames and renamed Pearl of London.
