= Portsmouth Queen =

Short-sea ferry

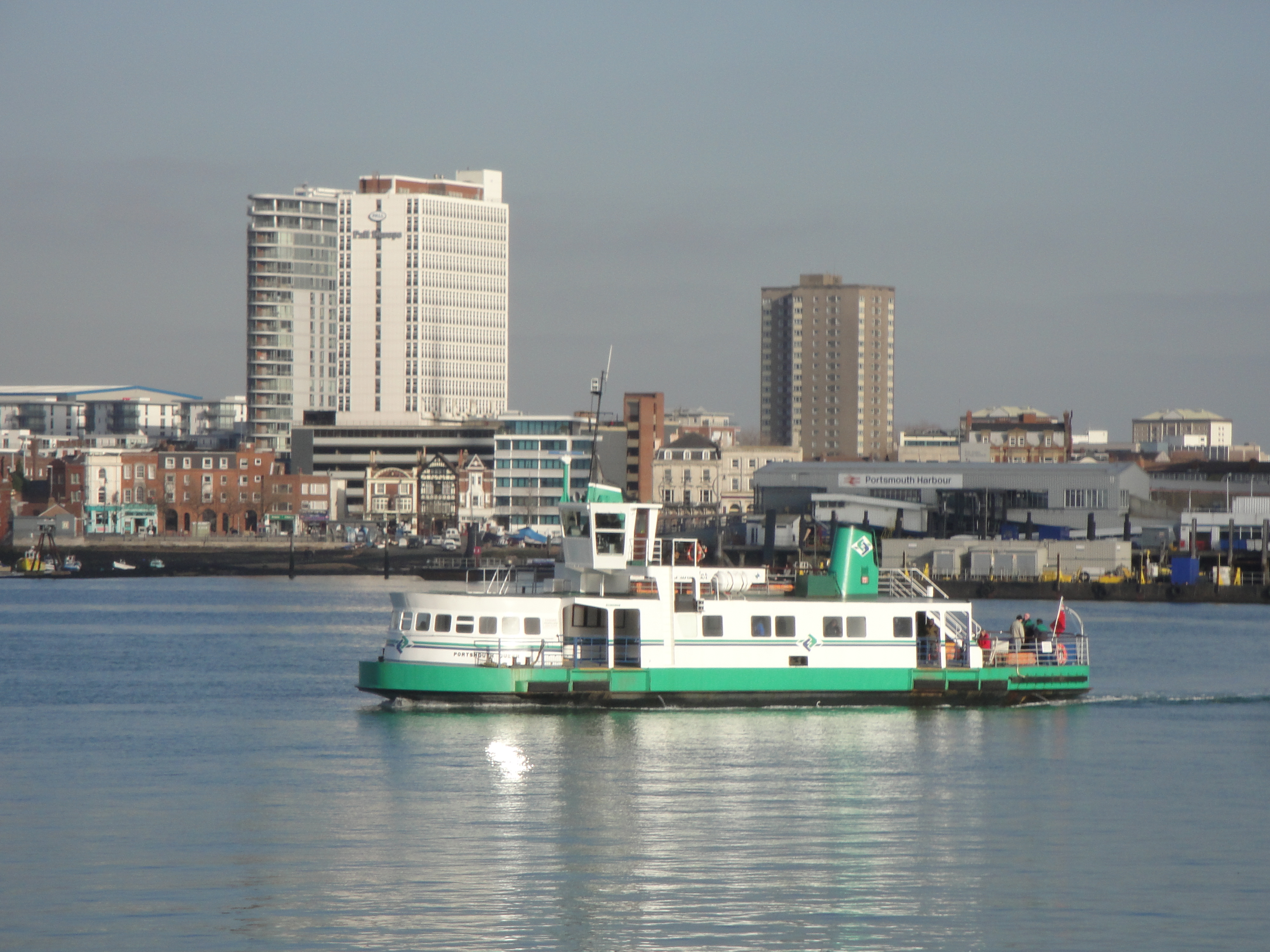
Portsmouth Queen in January 2011

Portsmouth Queen was a vessel owned by Gosport Ferry. It was built by Thornycroft of Woolston, Hampshire.

== History ==
The vessel was built in 1966 to the exact design to the Gosport Queen and was delivered in a green and white livery. Later, it was repainted into the now standard Gosport Ferry colours. The vessel is no longer in service, but use to run alongside the new Spirit of Gosport or the Spirit of Portsmouth. In the early days it was always hard to tell Portsmouth Queen apart from her twin sister Gosport Queen.

The Portsmouth Queen was sold to Absolute Charters and left Gosport for the final time on 29 February 2016, to start a new life on the River Thames in London, and was renamed London Queen. However work stalled on the refit and the vessel remained in Queenborough and was once again up for sale. In April 2022, she was in the drying harbour in Saint Peter Port, Guernsey, before being towed back to England in June 2022. As of 2025, she was sighted moored to a ship's scrap yard jetty in Kent.
