= Brownsea Island Ferries =

Brownsea Island Ferries Ltd
- Founded: 1887 (as J Harvey & Sons)
- Headquarters: Poole, United Kingdom
- Area served: Poole Harbour
- Services: Passenger transportation
- Website: www.brownseaislandferries.com

Brownsea Island Ferries Ltd is a company that operates ferries to Brownsea Island in Poole Harbour from Poole and Sandbanks. It also operates cruises around Poole Harbour, Bournemouth, Sandbanks, the Jurassic Coast and the Isle of Wight. The vessels operated by the company are the Maid of Poole, Maid of the Harbour, Maid of the Lakelands and Maid of the Islands.

== Gallery ==
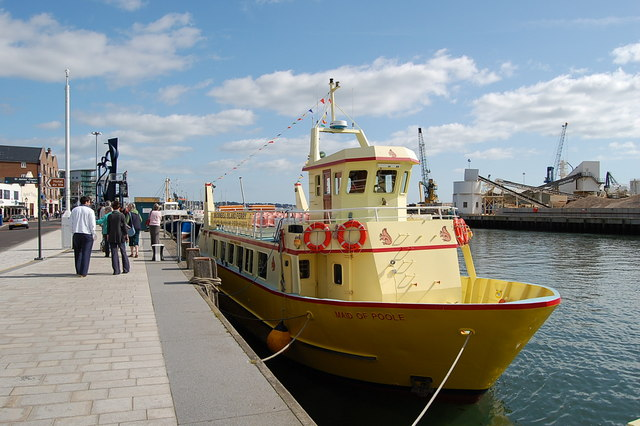
Maid of Poole at Poole Quay

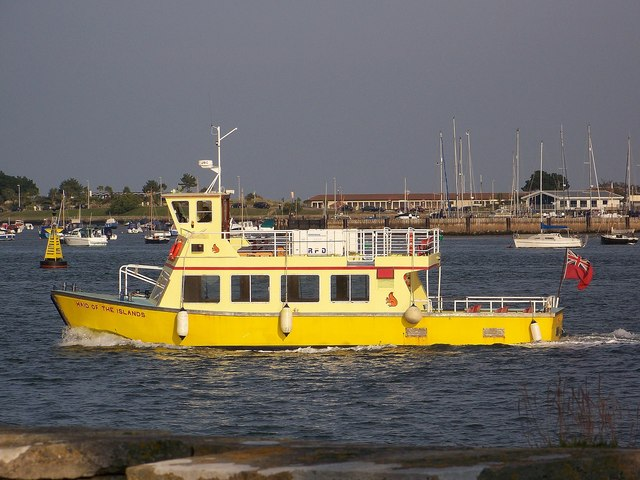
Maid of the Islands

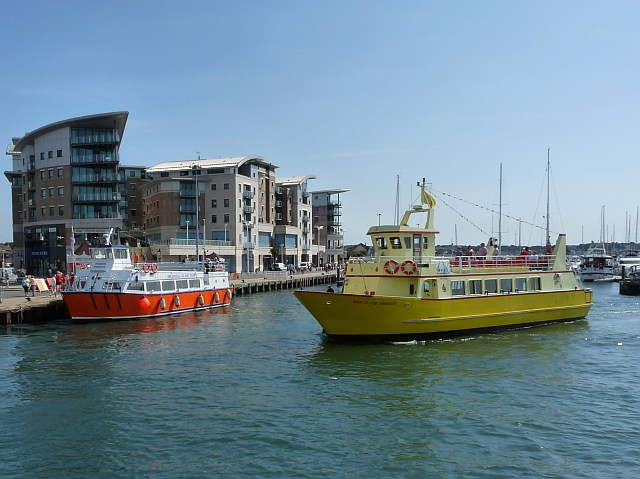
Maid of the Harbour approaching Poole Quay

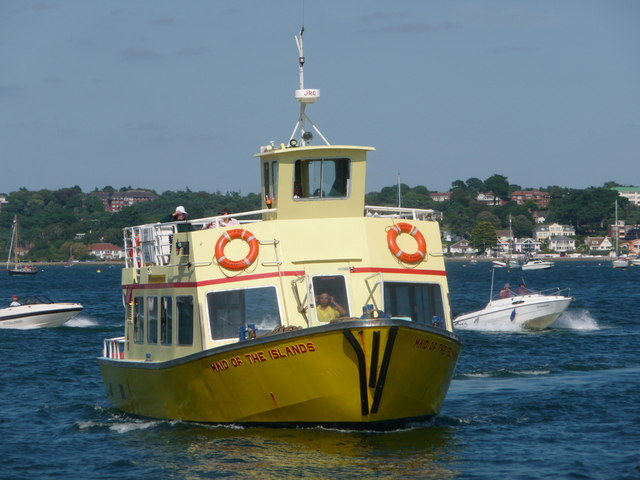
Maid of the Islands
