= Marine restoration =

Marine restoration involves actions taken to restore the marine environment to its state prior to anthropogenic damage. This is particularly disastrous, given that the ocean takes up the largest part of our planet and serves as the home to many organisms, including the algae that provides most oxygen on Earth. The ocean is currently suffering from the impacts of human damage including pollution, acidification, and species loss, among other effects. Efforts have been made by various agencies to help alleviate these issues.

== Methods ==
=== Carbon dioxide removal ===
The ocean has long helped get rid of excess carbon on Earth with its role in the Carbon cycle. However, the excess emissions and warming temperature as the result of climate change may change the ocean's ability to cycle carbon as efficiently. This has made it necessary to augment natural processes to increase the natural amount of Carbon Dioxide Removal (CDR). Electrochemical approaches remain the most popular. Current methods involve applying voltage to a membrane stack to split the stream of water. A team of professors from MIT have hypothesized ways to make the methods cheaper and more efficient. Efforts to improve carbon capture naturally by means of preserving seagrass meadows have been enacted by various British conservation efforts.

=== Coral restoration ===
Coral reefs provide a vital part of the ocean ecosystem, serving as the habitat to many species and protection for the coastline from erosion and storms. At this time, thirty to fifty percent of Earth's coral reefs have already been lost . Coral has been threatened by pollution, overfishing, and unsafe fishing techniques. Methods to restore coral reefs have involved the gardening and transplanting of coral developed at different sites to locations previously inhabited by coral, as well as the use of green engineering methods to help the coral become more suited to the changing environment.

=== Mangrove regrowth ===
Mangrove forests, like coral reefs, are essential for protecting the coastlines and providing a habitat for various aqueous creatures . They, too, have been severely threatened, mostly for wood harvesting and fish farms. Wetland scientist Robin Lewis has spent the past few decades restoring mangrove forests. Previously, attempts to restore mangrove environments were made by replanting mangrove seedlings grown elsewhere, but this proved to be ineffective. Lewis took to moving dirt and relying on tide systems, which proved more effective . There are currently multiple mangrove restoration organizations across the world to help protect biodiversity.

=== Removing pollutants ===
Plastic, oil, and other pollutants have detrimental impacts on marine environments. As a result, various organizations have developed technology to physically remove pollutants. There has been some criticism of clean-up methods, such as The Ocean Cleanup, over concerns that the methods, similar to trawling, may harm marine life and do not understand the nature of plastic pollution in the ocean. At this point, the more effective method of combating ocean pollution is keeping it from reaching the ocean to begin with through waste management and legislation to prevent further pollution . Some research has shown that certain bacteria could naturally consume plastics, but more studies are needed.

== Legislation ==
In order to enforce protection to the marine environment, various pieces of legislation have been passed. The Clean Water Act was passed in the US Congress in 1972 to protect national waters. The United Nations Environment Programme created The Global Programme of Action for the Protection of the Marine Environment from Land-based Activities to protect marine ecosystems. They also passed the International Convention for the Prevention of Pollution from Ships in 1973 to prevent ship-based pollution to the ocean. The United Nations Convention on the Law of the Sea was updated from its original intention of the Law of the Sea to include protecting wildlife and marine ecosystems, which was agreed upon by countries from all inhabited continents. Various cities, states, and countries have placed bans on single use plastic with marine protection often cited as a primary reason. The Break Free From Plastic Act reached the US Senate in 2023 and is still in the legislative process, as of 2025, though it is unlikely it will pass.

== Organizations ==
- Ocean Visions
- Running Tide
- Oceana
- Woods Hole Oceanographic Institution
- National Ocean and Atmospheric Administration (NOAA)
- Coral Restoration Foundation
- Oceanic Preservation Society

== See also ==
- Climate restoration
