= Alexander McNab =

Alexander McNab may refer to:

- Alexander McNab (cricketer), Scottish sportsman
- Alex McNab, Scottish-American soccer (football) player
- Sandy McNab, Scottish footballer
- Alexander McNab, a New Zealand runholder and father of politician Robert McNab
- Alexander McNab, the originator of the McNab dog
