= John Stirling (moderator) =

Church of Scotland clergyman

John Stirling (1776–1846) was a minister of the Church of Scotland who served as Moderator of the General Assembly in 1833, the highest position in the Scottish church.

== Life ==
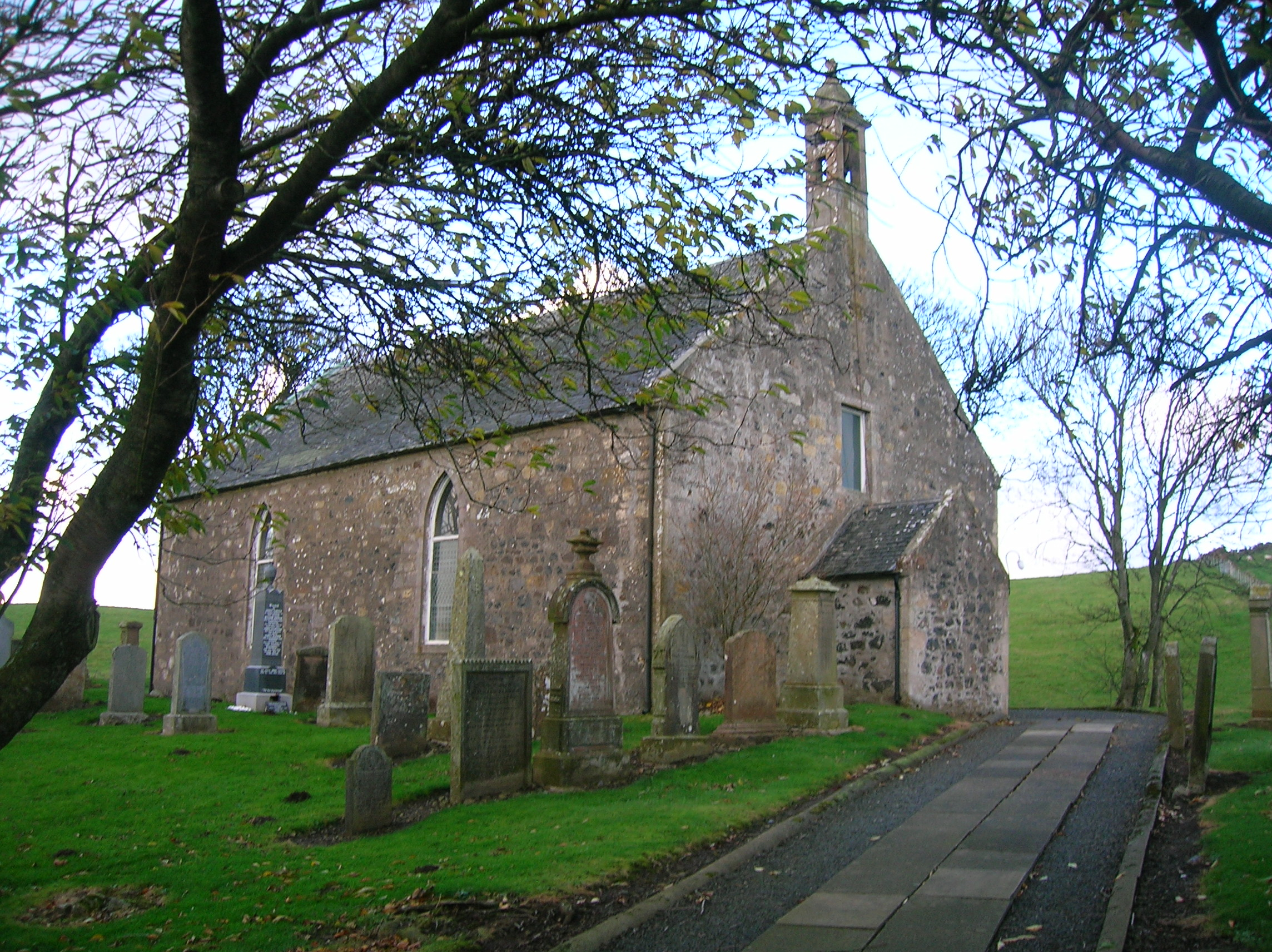
Craigie Church in Ayrshire

He was born in Dunblane in 1776 the second son of John Stirling. He studied Divinity at Glasgow University and was licensed to preach by the Presbytery of Dunblane in January 1800.

In November 1805 under patronage of William Campbell, Laird of Craigie he was ordained as minister of Craigie, South Ayrshire. In May 1812 Glasgow University awarded him an honorary Doctor of Divinity.

In 1833 he succeeded the controversial Rev. Thomas Chalmers as Moderator of the General Assembly of the Church of Scotland, the highest position in the Scottish Church. He was succeeded in turn by Rev. Patrick MacFarlan.

He died in Craigie manse on 13 January 1846.

== Family ==
In April 1806 he married Mary McQuhae daughter of Rev. Dr. William McQuhae of St Quivox. They had several children:

- James Stirling (1807–1823) born 7.5 months after the marriage
- Mary Laurie Stirling (1808–1867) married Thomas Ainsworth of The Flosh, High Sheriff of Cumberland
- Isobella (1809–1826)
- Jane Erskine Stirling (b. 1811)
- Elizabeth (1812–1840) married William Erskine of the Bombay Medical Service
- Lydia Ainsworth Stirling (1814–1829)
- William (1816–1852) became a Liverpool merchant
- Rose Sophia (b. 1818)
- John Stirling of Fairburn (1820–1907) a flax spinner in Cleator
- Laura Margaret (1822–1846)
- Annabella Fullerton (b. 1824)
- James (1827–1846)
