= Ross Drinnan =

Scottish cricketer and administrator

Personal information
- Full name: William Murdoch Ross Drinnan
- Born: 28 May 1883; St Quivox, Ayrshire, Scotland
- Died: 10 March 1948 (aged 64); Ayr, Ayrshire, Scotland
- Batting: Left-handed
- Bowling: Slow left-arm orthodox

Domestic team information
- Years: Team
- 1932: Scotland

Career statistics
Competition	First-class
Matches	1
Runs scored	24
Batting average	–
100s/50s	–/–
Top score	24*
Balls bowled	168
Wickets	3
Bowling average	34.00
5 wickets in innings	–
10 wickets in match	–
Best bowling	2/43
Catches/stumpings	–/–
- Source: Cricinfo, 30 July 2022

William Murdoch Ross Drinnan (28 May 1883 — 10 March 1948) was a Scottish first-class cricketer.

Drinnan was born in May 1883 at St Quivox, Ayrshire. He played club cricket for Ayr and was particularly successful for the club in 1913, when he broke a number of Scottish amateur cricket records as a bowler. Despite success at club level, it was not until 1928 that Drinnan represented Scotland in first-class cricket, making a single appearance against Ireland at Edinburgh. With his slow left-arm orthodox bowling, he took three wickets in the match; he dismissed Arthur Robinson in the Irish first innings with figures of 1 for 59, and in their second innings he dismissed Thomas MacDonald and Arthur Douglas with figures of 2 for 43. In Scotland's second innings, he played a key role in helping them to secure a draw by remaining unbeaten on 24 and sharing in an unbeaten tenth wicket partnership of 44 with Thomas Watson. Outside of cricket, he was a building contractor. Drinnan later died in the Wallacetown area of Ayr in March 1948.
