= William McQuhae =

Scottish clergyman

William McQuhae or M'Quhae (1737–1823) was a senior Scottish clergyman in the Church of Scotland who by the time of his death was Father of the Church. He is one of the few persons to have declined the offer to be Moderator of the General Assembly. He was a member of the New Light Movement. He is mentioned in a poem by Robert Burns.

== Life ==
McQuhae was born in Wigtown on 1 May 1737 the son of David McQuhae, a local magistrate and his wife Margaret Laurie. In his youth in Edinburgh he was a close friend of James Boswell, and tutored Boswell's younger brothers, David and John. He studied at the University of Glasgow and was licensed by the Presbytery of Wigtown to preach as a Church of Scotland minister on 24 March 1762. He served as assistant in St Quivox to George Reid. On Reid's death in 1763 McQuhae was presented as the new minister of St Quivox by James Murray of Broughton. He was formally ordained in the position on 1 March 1764. In June 1794 St Andrews University awarded him a Doctor of Divinity. In 1806 he declined the position of Moderator of the General Assembly and the post was instead given to Rev William Taylor of St Enoch's Church in Glasgow. He died as Father of the Church on 1 March 1823, on the 59th anniversary of his ordination.

== Family ==
He married twice: firstly in November 1765 to Elizabeth Park daughter of William Park of Barkip. They had several children, most of whom died young: Richard McQuhae (1766–1805) died in Jamaica; Sarah (1769–1778); Margaret (1770–1836); David (1773–1775); Elizabeth (1774–1778); Glencairn (daughter) (1776–1802); Charles (daughter) (1778–1855) married Alexander McDowal.

Following his wife's death he married Mary Lawrie (died 1824) in June 1782. They had several more children: Mary (born 1783) married John Stirling, minister of Craigie, Elizabeth (born 1784); Lydia Wills McQuhae (born 1785) married Thomas Ainsworth of Blackburn; William McQuhae (1787–1824) a Major in the British Army died in Calcutta; Patrick (born 1788); James (1790–1819); Stair Park McQuhae (1795–1872) succeeded his father as minister of St Quivox; Laura Macrae McQuhae (1798–1802).

The family continued to live in the manse after William's death (with his son as minister) and it was extended to 1825 to accommodate the large family.

== Publications ==
- The Difficulties Which Surround the Practice of Religion (1785)
- Statistical Account of the Parish

== Trivia ==
As an active figure in the church in Ayrshire during Robert Burns' lifetime, McQuhae is one of twelve ministers mentioned in Burns' poem "The Holy Tulzie", also called "The Twa Herds". Weighing in on a parish boundary dispute, Burns refers to McQuhae as "that curs'd rascal", and disparages his "pathetic manly sense".
