= Thomas Oliver (physician) =

Scottish physician

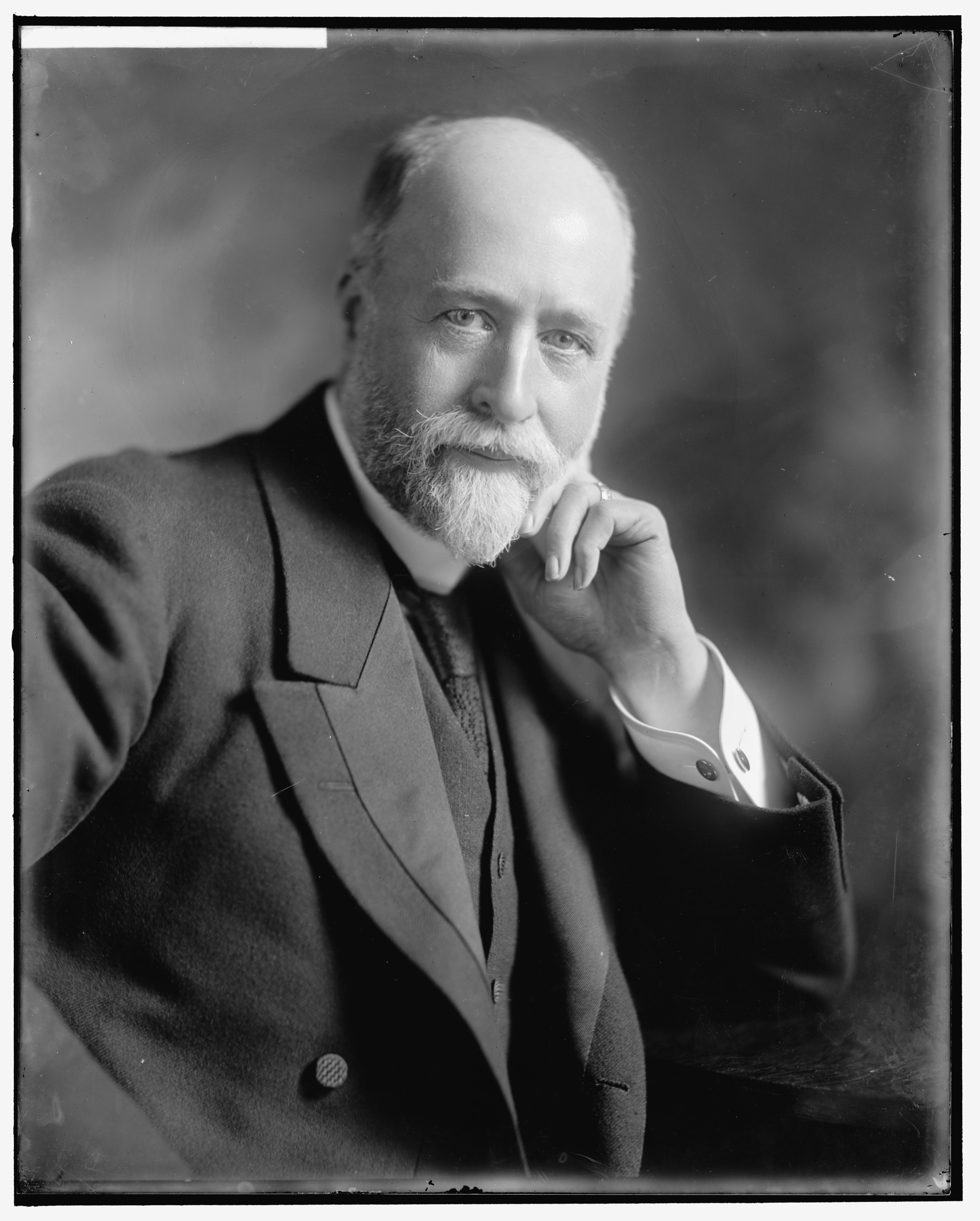
- Born: 2 March 1853; St Quivox, Ayrshire
- Died: 15 May 1942 (aged 89); Newcastle-upon-Tyne
- Occupation: Physician

Sir Thomas Oliver FRSE (2 March 1853 – 15 May 1942) was a Scottish physician and expert on industrial hygiene, particularly in the mining industry and antimony workers. He was President of the College of Medicine 1926 to 1934 and President of the Royal Institute of Public Health and Hygiene from 1937 to 1942.

== Life ==
He was born in St Quivox in Ayrshire on 2 March 1853 the son of James Oliver and his wife, Margaret McMurtrie. He was educated at Ayr Academy then studied medicine at Glasgow University graduating MB ChM in 1874. He undertook some practical experience at Glasgow Royal Infirmary then went to Paris to undertake further postgraduate studies.

Returning to Britain he worked in Preston Hospital from 1875 to 1879. In 1880 he began lecturing at the Medical School of Durham University. In 1889 he was created Professor of Medicine. In 1892 he became a member of the White Lead Commission and was instrumental in banning females from being employed in its production.

In 1895 he was elected a Fellow of the Royal Society of Edinburgh. His proposers were Sir James Alexander Russell, John Gray McKendrick, Diarmid Noel Paton and George Alexander Gibson. He received the honorary degree of Doctor of Laws from the University of Glasgow in early 1903, and was knighted by King Edward VII in 1908.

In the First World War he was instrumental in the creation of the Tyneside Scottish battalion, gathering Bedlington miners to join the war effort and was given the rank of Honorary Colonel.

He retired in 1927.

He died aged 89 in Newcastle-upon-Tyne on 15 May 1942.

== Publications ==
- Lead Poisoning in its Acute and Chronic Forms (1891)
- Dangerous Trades; the Historical, Social, and Legal Aspects of Industrial Occupations as Affecting Health, by a Number of Experts (1902)
- Diseases of Occupation (1908)

== Family ==
In 1881 he married Edith Rosina Jenkins, daughter of William Jenkins of Consett Hall. Following her death, in 1888, in 1893 he married Emma Octavia Woods (d. 1912), daughter of John Woods of Benton Hall in Newcastle.

He had two sons and three daughters.

Academic offices
Preceded by Prof Percy John Heawood	Vice-Chancellor & Warden of the University of Durham; 1928 - 1930	Succeeded by The Revd Henry Ellershaw
