= George Reid (moderator) =

Church of Scotland minister

George Reid (1692–1763) was a minister of the Church of Scotland, who served as Moderator of the General Assembly in 1755.

== Life ==
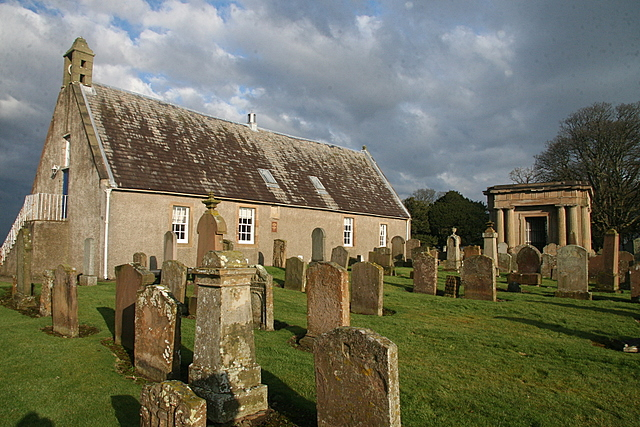
St. Quivox parish church

Reid was born in or near Edinburgh in 1692. In 1718, he graduated with an MA from the University of Edinburgh. He was licensed to preach by the Presbytery of Dalkeith in April 1720.

He was ordained at Symington in Ayrshire in March 1723. In November 1732 he was translated to the small, ancient parish of St Quivox east of Ayr and retained this post for over 40 years.

In 1755 he succeeded Robert Hamilton as Moderator of the General Assembly of the Church of Scotland the highest position in the Scottish Church. He was succeeded by William Leechman.

He died in St Quivox on 21 March 1763 aged 70. His position at St Quivox was filled by Rev Dr William McQuhae, who had declined Moderatorship (in 1805).

== Family ==
In 1745 he married Janet Ballantine, daughter of Ninian Ballantine of Gardrum and widow of Thomas Patertson a merchant in Ayr. They had children.
