= William Taylor (moderator) =

Church of Scotland Moderator

William Taylor (1748–1825) was a minister of the Church of Scotland who served as Moderator of the General Assembly in 1806. He was Chaplain in Ordinary to both King George III and King George IV in Scotland.

== Life ==
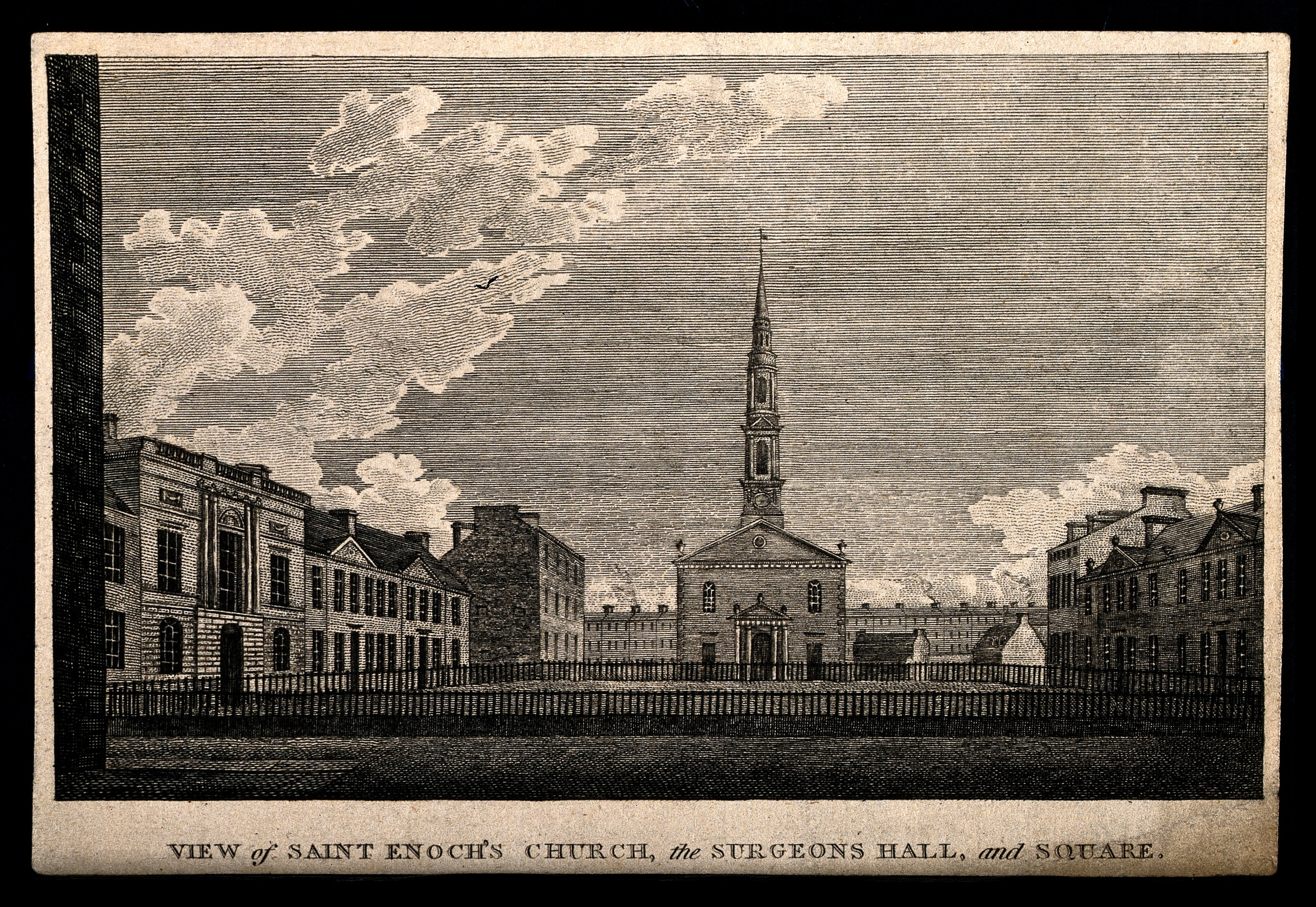
St. Enoch's Church (centre)

He was born on 28 February 1748 in Crieff the eldest son of John Taylor a local merchant. He was educated at Crieff Parish School then studied at Glasgow University.

His entry to the ministry was at the Chapel of Glasgow College. In April 1777 he was ordained as minister of Baldernock, a small village ten miles north of Glasgow. In April 1782 he was interviewed by the Magistrates and Council of Glasgow with the prospect of taking over a new church in Glasgow dedicated to St Thenew, the mother of St Mungo (i.e. a female saint). Through corruption of the name the locals quickly branded the church "St Enoch" (wrongly implying a male saint). Taylor was translated as the first minister of St Enoch's in November 1782.

In 1787 he was living in Adams Court off Argyle Street.

Glasgow University awarded him an honorary Doctor of Divinity (DD) in 1800. In 1806 (due to Rev William McQuhae declining the position) he succeeded Rev George Hamilton as Moderator of the General Assembly of the Church of Scotland, the highest position in the Scottish church.

In January 1812 he was elected Chaplain in Ordinary to King George III and continued this role for his son King George IV.

He died in Glasgow on 15 March 1825. He was buried in the churchyard at St Enoch's but this was destroyed when the church was demolished in 1926 to make way for a bus station.

== Family ==
In March 1786 he married Christian Allan daughter of Richard Allan of Bardowie. Their children included:

- John Taylor of Ballochneck (1787-1829)
- Richard Allan Taylor (1788-1869) advocate
- Lt Gen William Taylor HEICS (1790-1868) died in New Zealand
- Mary (1793-1796)
- James (d. 1825)

== Publications ==
- An Address to the People of Scotland (1794)
- The Love of Our Country Explained and Inforced (1803)
- On the Death of George III (1820)
