= Holy Willie's Prayer =

1785 poem by Robert Burns

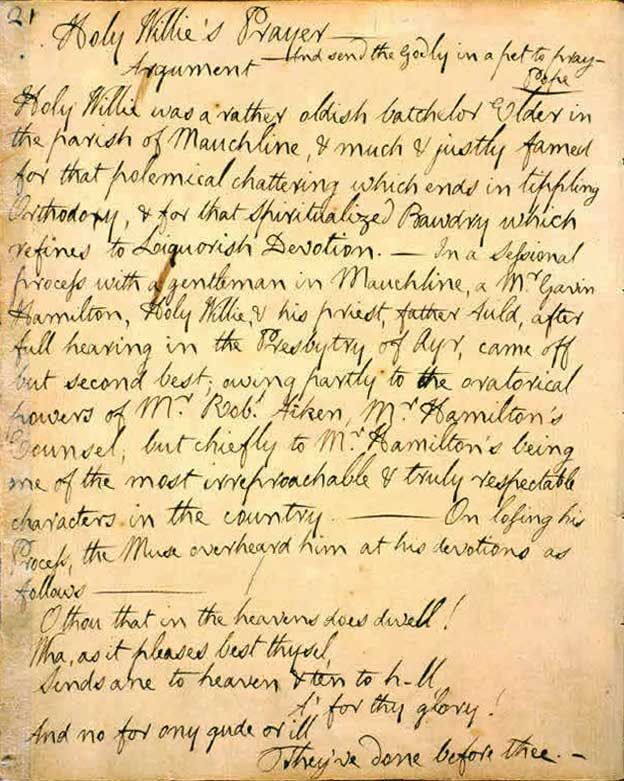
Page of poem

"Holy Willie's Prayer" is a poem by Robert Burns. It was written in 1785 and first printed anonymously in an eight-page pamphlet in 1789. It is considered the greatest of all Burns' satirical poems, one of the finest satires by any poet, and a withering attack on religious hypocrisy.

It is written in the Scots language, but is accessible to most modern English readers.

== Analysis ==
The poem is an attack on the bigotry and hypocrisy of some members of the Kirk, or Church of Scotland, as told by the (fictional) self-justifying prayer of a (real) kirk elder, Willie Fisher.

In his prayer, Holy Willie piously asks God's forgiveness for his own transgressions and moments later demanding that God condemn his enemies who commit the same sins to eternal hellfire. Burns used Holy Willie to argue that the Calvinist theology of the Kirk encouraged hypocrisy.

Burns believed that John Calvin's doctrine of predestination, whether to salvation or damnation, made people morally reckless. This was because their salvation was believed to rest, not on their own actions but on being assigned to the "elect" by an inscrutable God. He observed that belief in predestination had the additional tendency to make people insufferably self-righteous. It is this last tendency in particular, and the more general theological and moral sterility embodied in much of the teachings of the Kirk, that he lampoons very effectively in this work.

Holy Willie's self-righteousness and judgmentalism are skillfully alternated with tales of his own womanising, boozing, and other moral transgressions. The characters are drawn from real life, with no names being changed.

== The real Holy Willie ==
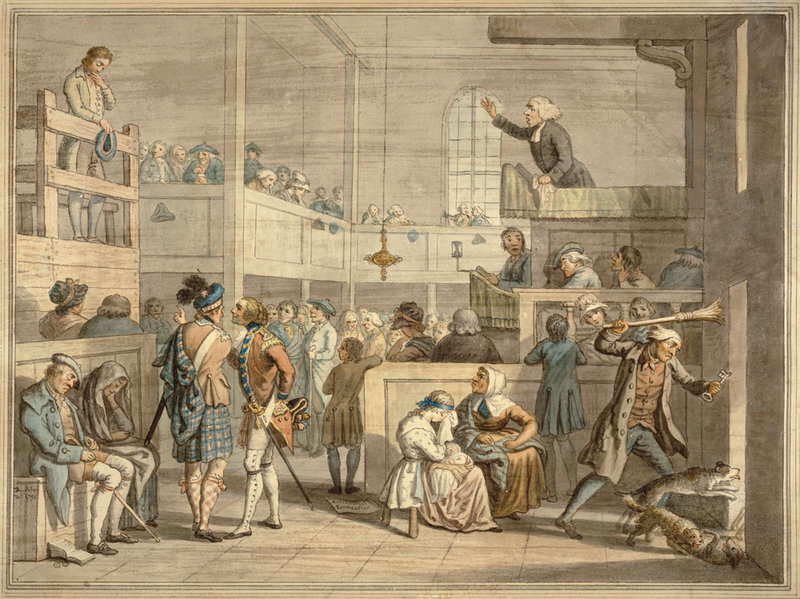
Satirical depiction of a Scottish kirk at the time of Burns. A painting by David Allan.

Willie Fisher was an elder of the kirk in Mauchline. Fisher conceived a dislike for Gavin Hamilton, a local lawyer, landlord and the collector of stent {https://dsl.ac.uk/entry/snd/stent_n2_v2}, administering the collection of poor relief within the parish, who also happened to be a close friend of Burns'. Hamilton was suspected of financial impropriety when inconsistencies in the accounts were discovered. It may be (this was Hamilton's defence) that the deficit was the result of Hamilton's kindly acts in forgiving the debts of those who were unable to pay their tithes to the kirk.

Fisher spied on Hamilton and added the charges of:

- Travelling on the Christian Sabbath.
- Not reading the Bible on a Sunday.
- Digging his garden on the Sabbath (hence the poem's reference to "kail and potatoes")

Fisher's complaint against Hamilton was heard and adjudicated by the Presbytery of Ayr, as is stated in Burns' own commentary on the poem. (In the Presbyterian polity of the Church of Scotland, a presbytery is a regional council of ministers and elders. It may function as a court when complaints against members, or more likely, ministers are brought to it.) Hamilton won the case. Hence, Holy Willie complains bitterly to God not only against Hamilton himself but also against the Presbytery:

"Lord, hear my earnest cry and pray'r,
Against that Presbyt'ry o' Ayr!"

Willie Fisher never recovered from the ignominy of this public defeat, and, legend has it, was found dead in a ditch with a bottle of whisky.

Burns' commentary appears in an early manuscript of the poem and is often printed with the poem in modern editions:

Holy Willie was a rather oldish bachelor elder, in the parish of Mauchline, and much and justly famed for that polemical chattering which ends in tippling orthodoxy, and for that spiritualized bawdry which refines to liquorish devotion. In a sessional process with a gentleman in Mauchline, a Mr. Gavin Hamilton, Holy Willie and his priest, Father Auld, after a full hearing in the Presbytery of Ayr, came off but second best, owing partly to the oratorical powers of Mr. Robert Aiken, Mr. Hamilton's counsel, but chiefly to Mr. Hamilton's being one of the most irreproachable and truly respectable characters in the country. On losing his process, the muse overheard him at his devotions.

== See also ==
- The Holy Tulzie
