= Robert MacFarlane (cricketer) =

Scottish cricketer

Personal information
- Born: 29 April 1908; Uddingston, Lanarkshire, Scotland
- Died: 13 February 1986 (aged 77); Uddingston, Lanarkshire, Scotland
- Batting: Right-handed
- Bowling: Right-arm medium

Domestic team information
- Years: Team
- 1939: Scotland

Career statistics
Competition	First-class
Matches	1
Runs scored	70
Batting average	35.00
100s/50s	–/–
Top score	48
Catches/stumpings	–/–
- Source: Cricinfo, 21 July 2022

Robert MacFarlane (29 April 1908 — 13 February 1986) was a Scottish first-class cricketer and administrator.

MacFarlane was born in April 1908 at Uddingston. He was educated at Uddingston Grammar School, before matriculating to the University of Glasgow. A club cricketer for Uddingston, he made a single appearance in first-class cricket for Scotland against Ireland at Dublin in 1939. Batting twice in the match, he was dismissed for 48 runs in the Scottish first innings by James MacDonald, while in their second innings he was dismissed for 20 runs by James Boucher, with Scotland winning the match by 162 runs. MacFarlane later served as the president of the Scottish Cricket Union in 1960. By profession, he was a schoolmaster. MacFarlane died at Uddingston in February 1986.
