= John Kirk (cricketer) =

Scottish cricketer

Personal information
- Full name: John Alexander Wright Kirk
- Born: 2 December 1888; Coatbridge, Lanarkshire, Scotland
- Died: 21 October 1961 (aged 72); Coatbridge, Lanarkshire, Scotland
- Batting: Right-handed
- Bowling: Right-arm medium

Domestic team information
- Years: Team
- 1920–1923: Scotland

Career statistics
Competition	First-class
Matches	3
Runs scored	15
Batting average	3.75
100s/50s	–/–
Top score	11
Balls bowled	792
Wickets	11
Bowling average	31.36
5 wickets in innings	–
10 wickets in match	–
Best bowling	4/80
Catches/stumpings	3/–
- Source: Cricinfo, 28 October 2022

John Alexander Wright Kirk (2 December 1888 – 21 October 1961) was a Scottish first-class cricketer.

Kirk was born at Coatbridge in December 1888. He was educated at Uddingston Grammar School. A club cricketer for Uddingston, he made his debut for Scotland in first-class cricket against Ireland at Edinburgh in 1920. He made two further first-class appearances against Ireland at Glasgow in 1922 and Dublin in 1923. Playing as a right-arm medium pace bowler, he took 11 wickets at an average of 31.36, with best figures of 4 for 80. As a lower order batsman, he scored 15 runs with a highest score of 11. Kirk died at Coatbridge in October 1961.
