= Uddingston Grammar School =

Secondary school in South Lanarkshire, Scotland

Location
- Old Glasgow Road Uddingston; Uddingston, South Lanarkshire, G71 7BT; Scotland; 55.82303°N 4.08657°W

Information
- Type: Main Stream State School
- Motto: "Virtute Crescam" (May I Grow in Moral Excellence)
- Opened: August 1884
- Authority: South Lanarkshire Council
- Head teacher: John McKay
- Staff: 90 FTE
- Gender: Coeducational
- Age range: 11–18
- Enrollment: 1175 (as at September 2014)
- Houses: Arran, Bute, Harris, Lewis, Mull, Orkney and Skye
- Colours: Yellow, black, white
- Website: www.uddingston.s-lanark.sch.uk

Uddingston Grammar School is a mainstream state school in Uddingston, South Lanarkshire, Scotland. It is one of 17 secondary schools operated by South Lanarkshire Council. Its motto is 'Virtute Crescam' which means 'May I grow in moral excellence'.

The school was opened in August 1884, with its buildings located next to Uddingston railway station. In 2009, Uddingston Grammar moved to a new campus nearby (on the site of its former playing fields) as part of South Lanarkshire Council's school modernisation programme; the oldest of the existing buildings was converted into apartments as part of a residential development.

The school's catchment area includes the communities of Uddingston, Bothwell, Birkenshaw, Tannochside, Viewpark and recently parts of Newton in Cambuslang.

The school's roll is approximately 1900 pupils as of August 2025, with approximately 90 teaching staff (FTE).

== House groups ==
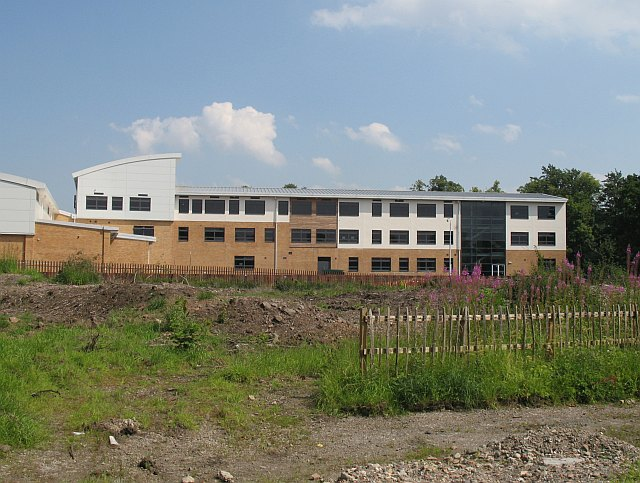
The school's new buildings under construction, July 2008

The school is divided into seven house groups: Arran, Bute, Lewis, Mull, Orkney, Harris and Skye, named after islands in Scotland.

Previously there were five house groups: named Clyde, Douglas, Kelvin, Dechmont and Calder after Scottish rivers.

== Notable former pupils ==
- Stuart Carswell, football player
- Colin Cameron, politician
- John Kirk, cricketer
- Robert MacFarlane, cricketer and cricket administrator
- Gary MacKenzie, football player
- Aileen McGlynn, Paralympic athlete
- Alexander McNab, cricketer
- Craig Moore, football player
- Iain Munro, former football player and manager
- Dr Gregor Smith, Chief Medical Officer for Scotland
- Thomas Watson, cricketer
- Lewis Budinauckas, currently Partick Thistle goalkeeper and former Scottish under 21s and rangers b team goalkeeper
