= David Hill (footballer, born 1881) =

Scottish footballer

Personal information
- Full name: David Alexander Hill
- Date of birth: 16 December 1881
- Place of birth: St Quivox, Scotland
- Date of death: 21 May 1928 (aged 46)
- Position: Left back

Youth career
- Underwood Strollers

Senior career*
| Years | Team | Apps | (Gls) |
| 1903–1904 | Ayr Parkhouse | 17 | (1) |
| 1904–1911 | Third Lanark | 76 | (0) |
| Total | | 93 | (1) |

International career
| 1906 | Scotland | 1 | (0) |
- * Club domestic league appearances and goals

David Alexander Hill (16 December 1881 – 21 May 1928) was a Scottish footballer who played as a left back.

== Career ==
Born in St Quivox, South Ayrshire, Hill played club football for Third Lanark, playing on the losing side in the 1906 Scottish Cup Final (he had been with the club when they won the same trophy the previous season, but was only a reserve player and was not selected for the match) and made one appearance for Scotland in 1906.
