= Alexander McNab (cricketer) =

Scottish cricketer

Personal information
- Full name: Alexander McNab
- Born: 11 January 1887; Uddingston, Lanarkshire, Scotland
- Died: 8 May 1943 (aged 56); Camden, New Jersey, United States
- Batting: Right-handed
- Bowling: Right-arm medium

Domestic team information
- Years: Team
- 1910: Scotland

Career statistics
Competition	First-class
Matches	1
Runs scored	0
Batting average	0.00
100s/50s	–/–
Top score	0*
Balls bowled	66
Wickets	0
Bowling average	–
5 wickets in innings	–
10 wickets in match	–
Best bowling	–
Catches/stumpings	–/–
- Source: Cricinfo, 2 November 2022

Alexander McNab (11 January 1887 – 18 May 1943) was a Scottish first-class cricketer.

McNab was born at Uddingston in January 1887, where he was educated at Uddingston Grammar School. A club cricketer for Uddingston, he made a single appearance in first-class cricket for Scotland against Ireland at Dublin in 1910. Batting twice in the match, firstly from the tail, he ended the Scotland first innings unbeaten on 0, while in their second innings he was dismissed without scoring by Gus Kelly, having been promoted up the batting order from number eleven to open. With his right-arm medium pace bowling, he bowled eleven wicketless overs across the match. McNab later emigrated to the United States, where he died in May 1943 at Camden, New Jersey.
