= McNab dog =

McNab Shepherd
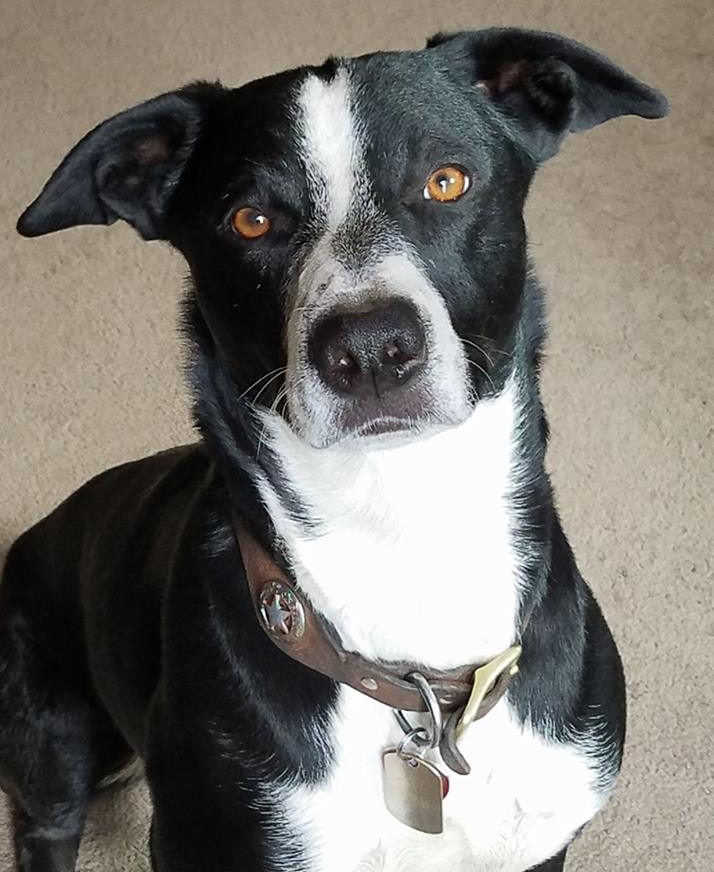
- Other names: McNab Stock Dog; McNab Collie; McNab Sheepdog; McNab Herding Dog
- Origin: United States
- Breed status: Not recognized as a breed by any major kennel club.
Traits
Height	Males	18-25 inches (45-66 cm)
	Females	16-21 inches (40-54 cm)
Weight	Males	35-65 lbs (16-30 kg)
	Females	30-50 lbs (14-23 kg)
- Coat: smooth, short or medium
- Color: Black, red or blonde with white markings, and tricolored

The McNab Dog, also called the McNab Shepherd or McNab Collie is a herding dog that originated in Hopland, Mendocino County, Northern California. The McNab was bred to withstand the tough conditions found in California such as heat, burrs, foxtails, and rugged terrain. Until recently, the McNab was little known outside California, but in last three decades have seen a gain in popularity and geographic dispersal of the breed.

== Appearance ==
The appearance of the McNab can vary considerably. The dog is medium-sized with females standing 16–21 inches at the shoulder and weighing 30–50 pounds and males standing 18–25 inches at the shoulder and weighing 35–65 pounds. The dogs have a variety of ear sets from pricked ears to floppy ears and everything in between. Tails are either short (bobbed naturally or mechanically) or long. McNabs come in colors of black, red, blonde, blue, lilac and sable with variations of solid, added white or added white and tan (tri colored). Their eyes are set well apart, almond shaped, and brown, hazel, or copper colored. The McNab coat is close, dense and weather resistant. They can have a slick single short coat, a short double coat, or a medium length single coat, but their fur is never long. One of the distinctive features of the McNab is their cat-like feet, which contribute to their agility.

== Breed status ==
The McNab is currently not recognized as a standardized breed by any major kennel club, including the American Kennel Club (AKC).

In 2014, a group of McNab Shepherd breeders and enthusiasts established the McNab Shepherd Registry (MSR). According to the MSR, their goal is to continue the betterment, advancement and welfare of the McNab Shepherd. The MSR is what is known as a "founding registry" because they exclusively utilize discovered genetic markers and DNA verification for registration.

Beginning in 2014, the MSR worked with Mars Veterinary on a study in an attempt to establish a unique genetic signature for the McNab Shepherd. Samples collected from McNabs across the United States were evaluated for their genetic signature and found to support the creation of a unique breed signature for the McNab. Additionally, the tested dogs were also evaluated for certain physical traits and over 100 disease-causing mutations to help establish a baseline for these in the McNab population.

== Temperament ==
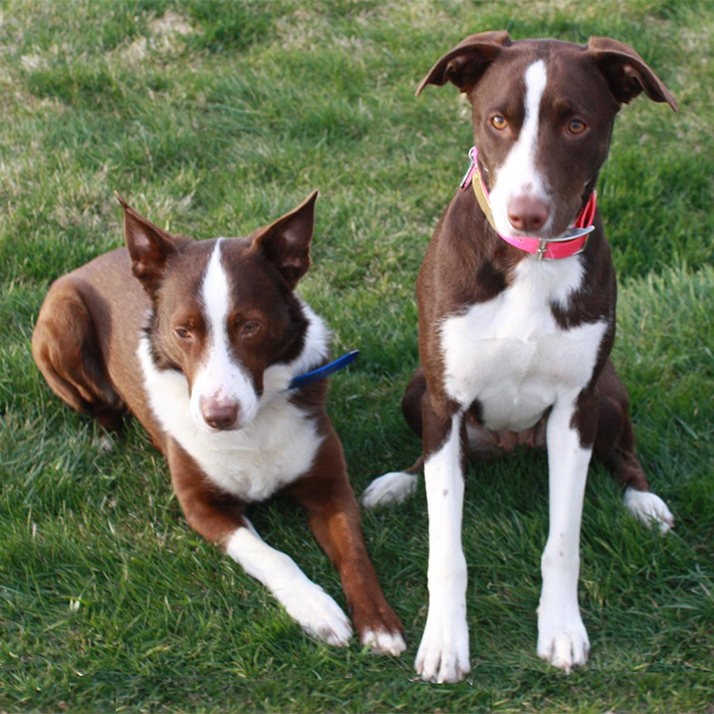
Two red and white McNab Shepherds

McNab Shepherds require more daily physical exercise and mental stimulation than many other breeds. A working McNab frequently runs for miles a day, using its herding skills to control livestock, and they can become restless if isolated or neglected. Unlike some other herding breeds, McNabs are not hyperactive. Providing a McNab has plenty of exercise, it is content to nap at its owner's side with a watchful and protective eye.

McNabs often bond tightly to their family members, including other household pets. They have a keen sense of territory and seldom wander away from home. They are also more likely to defend their territory and family members than many of the more sensitive herding breeds.

McNabs can be assertive and demanding, and they do best with guardians who are firm, consistent and skilled in positive dog training methods that don't trigger the McNabs instinct to push back against obstacles. Highly intelligent and quick to learn, the McNab needs to exercise its brain as much as its body. Families considering a McNab for a pet will need to set aside plenty of time to spend with their dog.

== Health ==
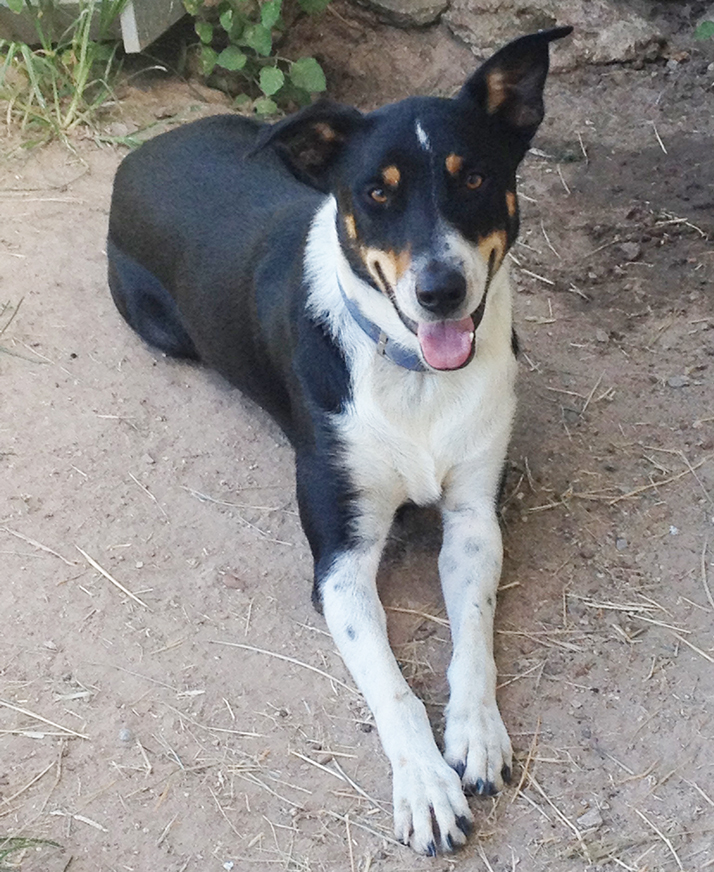
Tricolor McNab Shepherd

McNabs are hardy dogs with no breed specific health problems. Their average life span is 13–15 years.

McNab dogs may carry the MDR1 mutant gene and can be very sensitive to Ivermectin, which is a common ingredient in heartworm prevention medications. This drug and others can cause serious health problems or even death. A DNA test that demonstrates whether a dog has the mutation is available through the Washington State University College of Veterinary Medicine. The test can be completed by sending them a cheek swab through the mail.

== Activities ==
McNabs have a loose-eyed herding style and tend to work more independently than many herding breeds. They are skilled at both heading and heeling stock, meaning they can turn stock from the front or get behind stock and drive them forward. Originally bred to herd sheep, stock handlers quickly discovered that the McNabs bold nature and working abilities made them ideal for herding cattle. McNabs are also used for herding geese, goats, llamas and gathering horses in from the pasture. Renowned for their incredible endurance, McNabs have been known to cover over a hundred miles a day driving their herds.

McNabs are becoming increasingly popular in the world of dog sports. Their outstanding athletic prowess and agility coupled with high intelligence make them ideal competitors. McNabs are now competing successfully in agility trials, dock diving, disc dog competitions, herding, lure coursing, dog sledding, skijoring and flyball. They are also exceptional competitors in barn hunt and nose work. Many ranchers are competing with McNabs in the relatively new sport of Ranch Dog Herding where dog and handler on horseback work as a team herding three head of cattle through five obstacles and then into a stock trailer.

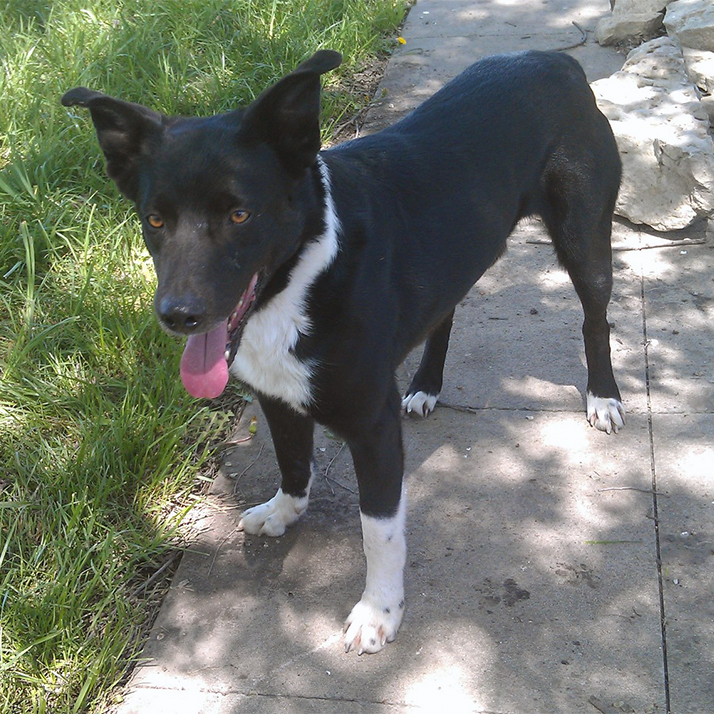
Black and white McNab Shepherd

The McNabs reputation as an indefatigable "all-weather" dog is also opening up a new avenue of work for the dog: Search and Rescue. Currently McNabs are working as evidence search dogs, cadaver dogs, archaeology dogs, and area search dogs for missing persons. Where many other breeds have to be pulled off the search because the dog is tiring, the only limitation for the McNab is the energy of its handler.

In addition to the above activities, McNabs are now becoming more common as service dogs, demonstrating sensitivity to the medical and psychological needs of humans.

== History ==
Alexander McNab left his native Scotland in the late 19th century, homesteading his 10,000 acre sheep ranch located in the Sanel Rancho, which later became Hopland, California. Looking to develop a herding dog that could handle the rough conditions on his ranch. McNab aptly called his dogs "McNab Shepherds".

In the early 1900s, the elder McNab passed the ranch down to his youngest son, John McNab, an attorney and stockman who reinvigorated his father's breeding style. Refinement of the McNab Shepherd continued and additional dogs were imported from Scotland for breeding and ranching purposes.

Over time, the McNab dogs proved to be supreme herding dogs which California ranchers came to depend on with confidence. Now the breed is spreading across the United States and Canada with a few McNabs working as stock dogs in Germany and some sporting McNabs as far away as Japan.
