= Thomas Watson (Scottish cricketer) =

Scottish cricketer

Personal information
- Full name: Thomas Watson
- Born: 13 October 1896; Larkhall, Lanarkshire, Scotland
- Died: 17 May 1974 (aged 77); Stonehouse, Lanarkshire, Scotland
- Batting: Right-handed
- Bowling: Right-arm fast-medium

Domestic team information
- Years: Team
- 1928–1931: Scotland

Career statistics
| Competition | First-class |
|---|---|
| Matches | 5 |
| Runs scored | 60 |
| Batting average | 15.00 |
| 100s/50s | –/– |
| Top score | 25* |
| Balls bowled | 816 |
| Wickets | 13 |
| Bowling average | 22.92 |
| 5 wickets in innings | – |
| 10 wickets in match | – |
| Best bowling | 3/54 |
| Catches/stumpings | 3/– |
- Source: Cricinfo, 23 October 2022

Thomas Watson (13 October 1896 – 17 May 1974) was a Scottish first-class cricketer.

Watson was born at Larkhall in October 1896 and was educated at Uddingston Grammar School. A club cricketer for Uddingston, he made his debut in first-class cricket for Scotland against Ireland at Edinburgh in 1928. A further appearance against Ireland followed at Dublin in 1929, before three first-class matches against touring international sides: the South Africans in 1929, the Australians in 1930, and the New Zealanders in 1931. Playing as a right-arm fast-medium bowler in the Scottish side, he took 13 wickets in his five matches at an average of 22.92, with best figures of 3 for 54. Watson died in May 1974 at Stonehouse, South Lanarkshire.
