= St Quivox =

Small Scottish village north of Ayr and east of Prestwick

Coordinates: 55.4827925°N 4.5737765°W

- Location within South Ayrshire Council area Location within Scotland Location within Scotland
- OS grid reference: NS 33853 21445
  - Edinburgh: 66 mi (106 km)
  - London: 330 mi (530 km)
- Country: Scotland
- Sovereign state: United Kingdom
- Police: Scotland
- Fire: Scottish
- Ambulance: Scottish

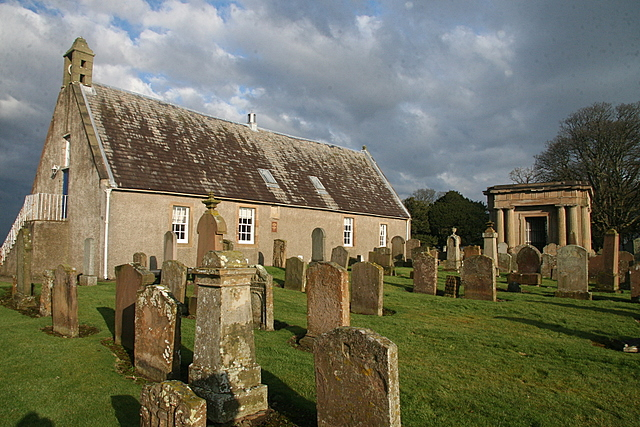
St. Quivox parish church and graveyard

St Quivox is a small Scottish village north of Ayr and east of Prestwick. It lies on the B7035 east of the A77.

== History ==
The uniquely named village is said to be a corruption either of St Kevoca, St Kevoch or St Kennocha. It is thought to have been a Christian settlement since the 8th century. It was previously known as Sanchar (Sanquhar) in Kyle, and was renamed after its church (and its saint) in the Middle Ages.

Auchincruive House and church lie within the parish boundary. Auchincruive church was described as a "rectory" in 1208 and from 1221 to 1238 was linked to a Gilbertine Priory at Dalmilling or Dalmulin, the only Gilbertine Priory in Scotland, but from 1238 to 1560 was under the control of Paisley Abbey before becoming a parish church.

After the Reformation the church came under the patronage of Alan, 4th Lord Cathcart who then owned Auchincruive House and he instructed a repair and remodelling of the church to Protestant standards in 1595. The church was substantially rebuilt in the 18th century.

The Scottish Agricultural College was built in the parish in 1927.

== Notable residents ==
- Very Rev Archibald Charteris (1835–1908) parish minister 1858/9
- Ross Drinnan (1883–1948), first-class cricketer
- Thomas Fergus (1850–1914) NZ politician
- David Hill (1881–1928) footballer
- Rev Dr William McQuhae parish minister 1764 to 1820
- Dr Thomas Oliver (1853–1942)
- George Oswald
- Very Rev George Reid (1693–1763)
