= Antitheism =

Opposition to theism, and usually to religion

Antitheism, also spelled anti-theism, is the philosophical position that theism should be opposed. The term has had a range of applications. In secular contexts, it typically refers to direct opposition to the belief in any deity. Unlike antireligion, antitheism is, in stricter interpretations of the term, not against those religions that do not have deities, such as some sects of Buddhism and Jainism. In some modern usage, however, the term is applied more broadly to opposition to religion in general, though the more precise term for that position remains antireligion.

== Etymology ==
The word antitheism (or hyphenated anti-theism) has been recorded in English since 1788. The etymological roots of the word are the Greek anti and theos.

The Oxford English Dictionary defines antitheist as "One opposed to belief in the existence of a god". The earliest citation given for this meaning dates from 1833. The term was likely coined by Pierre-Joseph Proudhon.

== Opposition to theism ==
Antitheism has been adopted as a label by those who regard theism as dangerous, destructive, or encouraging of harmful behavior. Christopher Hitchens (2001) wrote:

I'm not even an atheist so much as I am an antitheist; I not only maintain that all religions are versions of the same untruth, but I hold that the influence of churches, and the effect of religious belief, is positively harmful.

== Opposition to the properties of any deity ==
Other definitions of antitheism include that of the French Catholic philosopher Jacques Maritain (1953), for whom it is "an active struggle against everything that reminds us of God".

Christopher New (1993) proposed an altered definition of the word antitheism as part of a thought experiment. He imagines what arguments for the existence of an evil god would look like, and writes:

Antitheists, like theists, would have believed in an omnipotent, omniscient, eternal creator; but whereas theists in fact believe that the supreme being is also perfectly good, antitheists would have believed that he was perfectly evil.

New's changed definition has reappeared in the work of W.A. Murphree.

The misotheistic sense of the term's purported exclusion of atheists and agnostics disputed by Patheos in 2011.

Examples of belief systems founded on the principle of opposition to the properties of any deity include some forms of Atheistic Satanism and maltheism.

== Opposition to the existence and the properties of any deity ==
The definition of Robert Flint (1877), Professor of Divinity at the University of Edinburgh was similar. Flint's 1877 Baird Lecture was titled Anti-Theistic Theories. He used "antitheism" as a very general umbrella term for all opposition to his own form of theism, which he defined as:

the "belief that the heavens and the earth and all that they contain owe their existence and continuance to the wisdom and will of a supreme, self-existent, omnipotent, omniscient, righteous, and benevolent Being, who is distinct from, and independent of, what He has created."

However, Flint also acknowledged that antitheism is typically understood differently from how he defines it. In particular, he notes that it has been used as a subdivision of atheism, descriptive of the view that theism has been disproven, rather than as the more general term that Flint preferred. He rejected the alternative non-theistic: not merely because of its hybrid origin and character, but also because it is far too comprehensive. The theories of physical and mental science are non-theistic, even when in no degree, directly or indirectly, antagonistic to theism.

== See also ==
- Antireligion
- Materialism
- Naturalism (philosophy)
- Negative and positive atheism
- New Atheism
- Post-theism
- Secular humanism

== Sources ==
- Barker, Dan (1993). "Evangelistic atheism: Leading believers astray". Freethought Today. Archived from the original on 2005-11-26.
- Browne, Janet (2002). The Power of Place, Volume 2 of the Biography of Charles Darwin. Alfred Knopf
- Hitchens, Christopher (2001). Letters to a Young Contrarian (ISBN 0-465-03032-7). New York: Basic Books.
- Maritain, Jacques (1953). The Range of Reason. London: Geoffrey Bles. Electronic Text
  - Note: Chapter 8, The Meaning of Contemporary Atheism (p. 103–117, Electronic Text) is reprinted from Review of Politics, Vol. 11 (3) July 1949, p. 267–280 Electronic Text. A version also appears The Listener, Vol. 43 No.1102, 9 March 1950. pp. 427–429, 432.
- Segal, David (26 October 2006). "Atheist evangelist". The Washington Post (article). p. C01.
- Witham, Larry (2003). By Design, Encounter Books
- Wolff, Gary (November 2006). "The new atheism: The church of the non-believers". Wired magazine (reprint).
- Wright, N.T. (2005). The Last Word, Harper San Francisco
- OHCHR (2024). Hatred based on religion or belief must be addressed holistically.
