= Hugh Douglas (minister) =

Hugh Osborne Douglas KCVO CBE TD was an eminent Church of Scotland minister in the 20th century.

He was born into an ecclesiastical family in Glasgow on 11 September 1911 and educated at Glasgow Academy and the University of Glasgow. Licensed to preach by the Presbytery of Glasgow in 1935 he was Assistant Minister at Govan Old Parish Church until 1939. He was also Minister at St John's Leven, North Leith Parish Church and Dundee Parish Church (St Mary's) during his long career. He was Moderator of the General Assembly of the Church of Scotland from 1970 to 1971 and Dean of the Chapel Royal from 1974 until 1981.

He was appointed a Knight Companion of the Royal Victorian Order (KCVO) in the 1981 Birthday Honours.

An Honorary Chaplain to the Queen from 1959, he died on 4 January 1986.

== Notes ==
Religious titles
| Preceded by Thomas Moffat Murchison | Moderator of the General Assembly of the Church of Scotland; 1970–1971 | Succeeded by Andrew Herron |
| Preceded by James Boyd Longmuir | Dean of the Chapel Royal in Scotland; 1974–1981 | Succeeded by Robert Alexander Stewart Barbour |
