= Dundee Parish Church (St Mary's) =

- The Parish Church of Saint Mary
- Eaglais Naoimh Moire
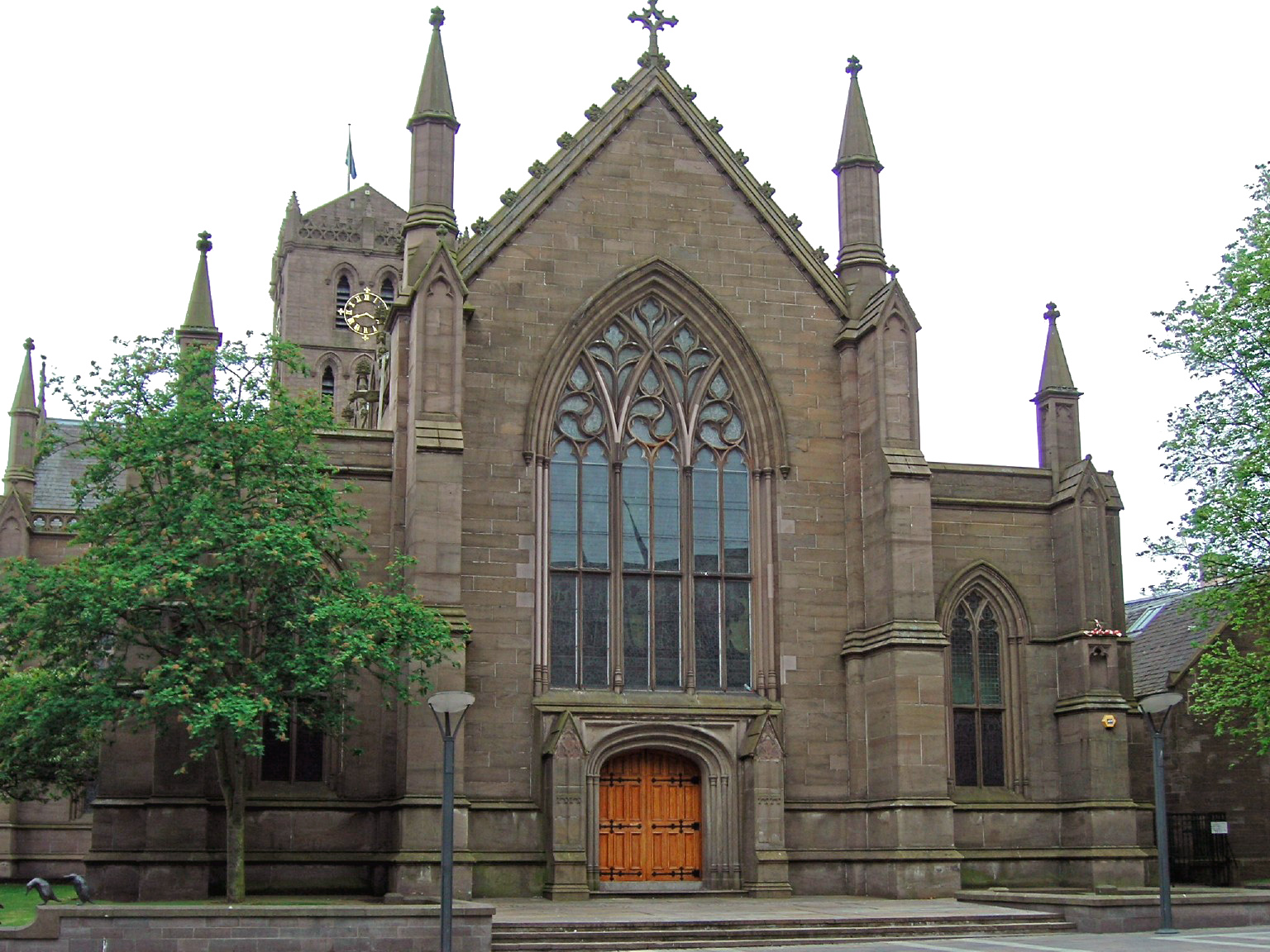
- Dundee Parish Church, St Mary's
- Dundee Parish Church
- 56°27′35″N 2°58′19″W
- Location: Dundee
- Country: Scotland
- Denomination: Church of Scotland
- Previous denomination: Roman Catholic
- Churchmanship: Presbyterian
- Website: Church Website

History
- Status: Parish church
- Founded: 1190
- Founder: David, Earl of Huntingdon
- Dedication: Virgin Mary

Architecture
- Functional status: Active
- Style: Gothic
- Completed: 1844

Administration
- Parish: Dundee

Dundee Parish Church (St Mary’s) is located in the east section of Dundee's "City Churches", the other being occupied by the Steeple Church. Both are congregations in the Church of Scotland, although with differing styles of worship.

Dundee played an important role in the Reformation, and John Knox asserts in his History of the Reformation that "the first face of a public church Reformed" was that of St Mary's in Dundee, by 1556.

The church dates back to 1190, when it was founded by David, Earl of Huntingdon, brother of William the Lion, King of Scots. The original buildings have not survived. In 1303 the church was burnt by an invading English army. Following a further invasion in 1547 the church was burnt down again, and the clock was taken to England. In the late Middle Ages, Dundee's was the largest parish church in Scotland with the Old Steeple, built in the 1470s during the Provostship of George Spalding, the tallest tower.

In 1841 three of the City Churches were again destroyed by fire. Two were rebuilt, the South Church or St Paul's and the East Church or St Mary's. St Mary's, now known as Dundee Parish Church (St Mary's) was rebuilt being completed in 1844 to the design of William Burn. In 1847 the rebuilt South Church was reopened under the name St Paul's (South) Church.

The Old Steeple dates back to the 1480s. Between 1782 and 1841 there were no fewer than four Church of Scotland congregations occupying the City Churches under one roof but with separate sanctuaries. After the post 1841 rebuilding there were three congregations, then two since the 1980s – namely Dundee Parish Church (St Mary’s) and the Steeple Church.

Several past ministers have served as Moderators of the General Assembly of the Church of Scotland, most recently the late Very Reverend Dr William B. R. Macmillan in 1991.

== Ministers from the Reformation to 1690 ==
St Mary's was the sole parish church for Dundee until 1834. Before this several congregations met within different parts of St Marys. A second congregation, the Second Charge, was founded in 1590. A Third Charge was added in 1609. Therefore from the period 1609-1690 there were three clergyman simultaneously deemed minister of Dundee, all leading their congregations within the one church. The church was divided into sections for the different congregations to meet.

First Charge:

- Paul Methven 1558–1560
- William Christison 1560–1597 Moderator in 1569
- Robert Howie 1598–1605
- David Lindsay, MA 1606–1634
- Andrew Collace, MA 1635–1639
- Andrew Auchinleck, MA 1642–1663
- Henry Scrymgeour, MA 1664–1690

Second Charge (Also known as South Church, though this part of St Mary's was destroyed in a fire in 1645):

- James Robertson 1588–1623
- John Duncanson, MA 1624–1651
- George Martin, MA 1658–1660
- Alexander Mylne 1661–1665
- John Guthrie, MA 1667–1685
- Robert Norie, MA 1686–1689
- George Anderson, MA 1690–1690

Third Charge (This congregation became St Paul's parish in 1834):

- William Wedderburn, MA 1611–1616
- Colin Campbell, MA 1617–1638
- John Robertson, MA 1641–1662
- William Rait 1662–1679
- Robert Rait 1682–1689

== Ministers since 1690 ==
In 1690, following the Glorious Revolution the Church of Scotland permanently switched to Presbyterian Government. The incumbent minister of the Parish of Dundee, Henry Scrymgeour demitted office in 1690 and the charge was declared vacant in 1694. The charge was not filled until 1699.

Since that time the following have served as minister of the charge:

- Samuel Johnstone MA 1699–1731
- Thomas Davidson 1732–1760
- Robert Small DD 1761–1808
- Archibald McLachlan DD 1808–1848
- Charles Adie DD 1848–1861
- Archibald Watson MA DD 1862–1881 Moderator in 1880 (died in office)
- Colin Campbell MA BD DD 1882–1905
- William L. Wilson MA 1905–1911
- Adam W. Fergusson MA BD 1911–1933
- Alfred Ernest Warr BD 1933–1936
- John Henry Duncan MA BPhil DD 1937–1951
- Hugh O. Douglas MA DD LLD KVCO CBE 1951–1977
- William B. R. MacMillan MA BD LLD DD 1978–1993
- Keith F. Hall MA BD 1994–present

== Memorials ==
The church includes a memorial to the soldiers of the 4th (City of Dundee) Battalion & 4/5th (Angus & Dundee) Battalion, the Black Watch, who died during the First World War. A new memorial and roll of honour to commemorate over 600 local seamen and women who died during the Great War was placed in the church in 2017. The memorial was unveiled by Her Royal Highness Anne, Princess Royal during a special service held in the church on 10 July 2017.

== See also ==
- List of Church of Scotland parishes
