= John Gau =

John Gau may refer to:

- John Gau (translator) (c. 1495–1553), Scottish translator
- John Gau (producer) (1940–2024), British television producer
