= James Longmuir =

The Very Reverend James Longmuir CBE TD
- Dean of the Chapel Royal
- Church: Church of Scotland
- In office: 1969 to 1973
- Predecessor: Charles Warr
- Successor: Hugh Douglas
- Other post: Moderator of the General Assembly (1968–1969)

Orders
- Ordination: 1934

Personal details
- Born: James Boyd Longmuir; 26 April 1907
- Died: 22 October 1973 (aged 66)
- Education: Dalziel High School

James Boyd Longmuir CBE, TD (26 April 1907 – 22 October 1973) was an eminent Church of Scotland minister in the 20th century.

== Early life ==
Longmuir was born on 26 April 1907. He was educated at Dalziel High School, a secondary school in Motherwell, North Lanarkshire, Scotland, and studied at the University of Glasgow.

== Ordained ministry ==
Longmuir was ordained to Swinton Parish in 1934 where he served until 1952. During World War II, he served with the Royal Army Chaplains' Department and was awarded the Territorial Decoration. After that he was Minister at Chirnside.

He was a member of the Kilbrandon Commission.

He was Dean of the Chapel Royal, Chaplain to HM Bodyguard for Scotland (The Royal Company of Archers) from 1969 to 1973 and an Honorary Chaplain to the Queen.

He served as Principal Clerk to the General Assembly of the Church of Scotland, and was appointed a Commander of the Order of the British Empire (CBE) in the 1973 New Year Honours.

Longmuir died on 22 October 1973. He was aged 66.

Religious titles
Preceded by William Roy Sanderson	Moderator of the General Assembly of the Church of Scotland; 1968–1969	Succeeded by Thomas Moffat Murchison
Preceded by Charles Laing Warr	Dean of the Chapel Royal in Scotland; 1969 –1973	Succeeded by Hugh Osborne Douglas
