= George Matheson =

British minister, hymn writer, and author

The Reverend George Matheson FRSE
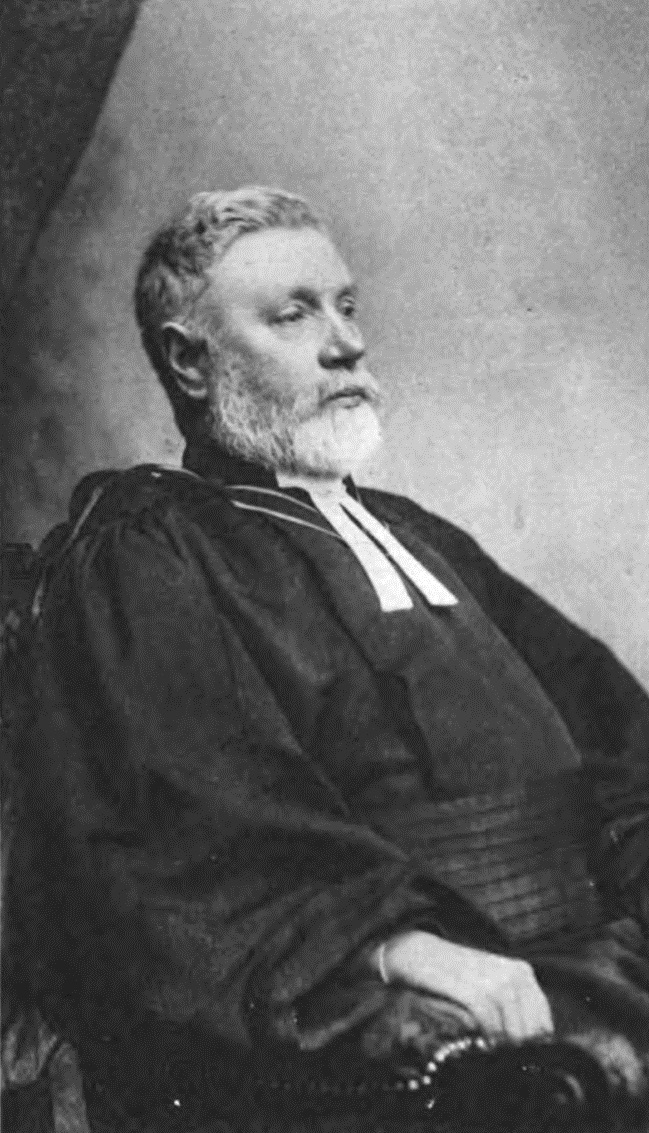
- Rev. George Matheson (1842–1906)

Personal life
- Born: 27 March 1842 Glasgow, Scotland
- Died: 28 August 1906 (aged 64) North Berwick, Scotland

Religious life
- Religion: Church of Scotland

George Matheson FRSE (27 March 1842 – 28 August 1906) was a Scottish minister and hymn writer and prolific author. He was blind from the age of 17.

== Early life ==
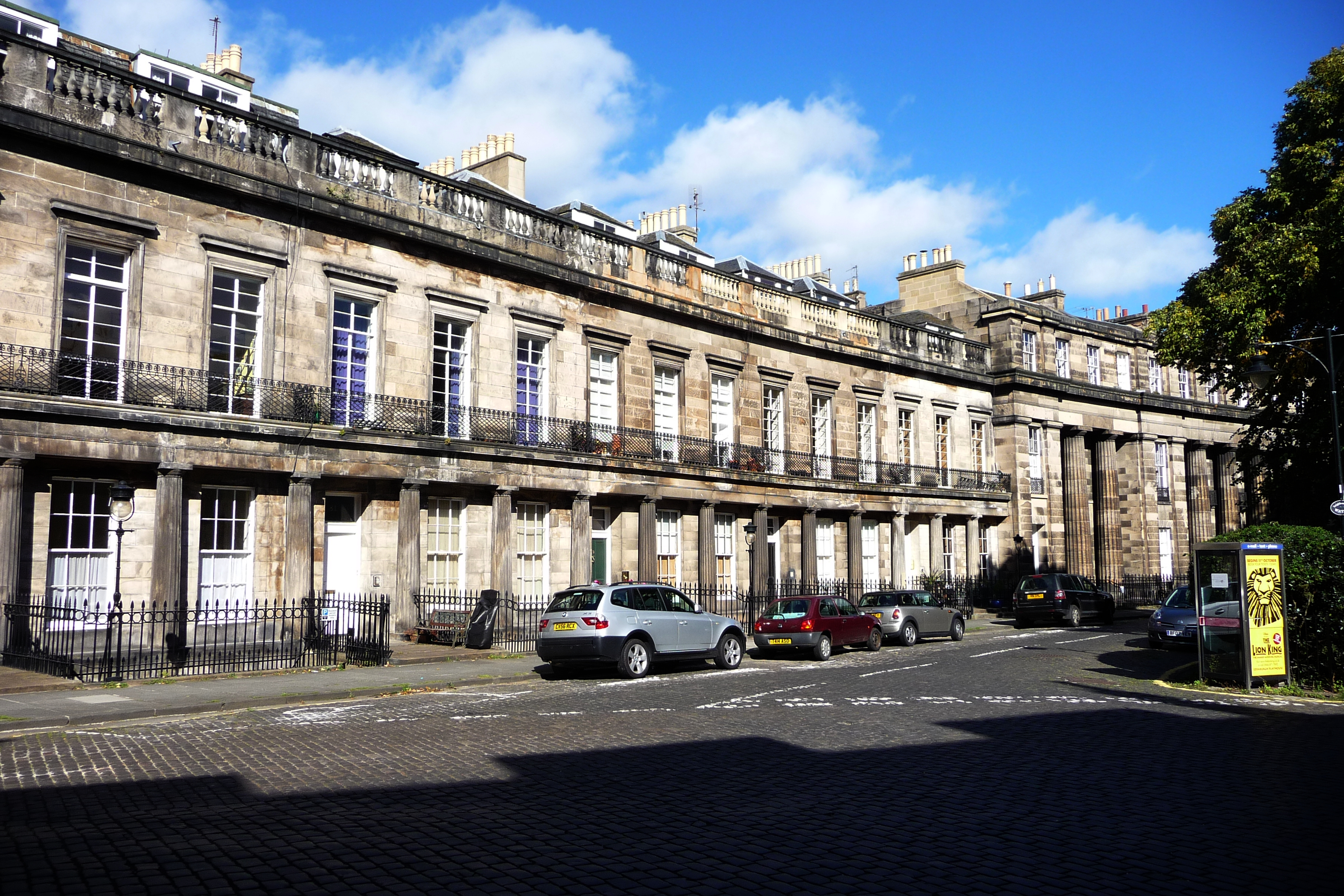
St Bernard's Crescent in Edinburgh

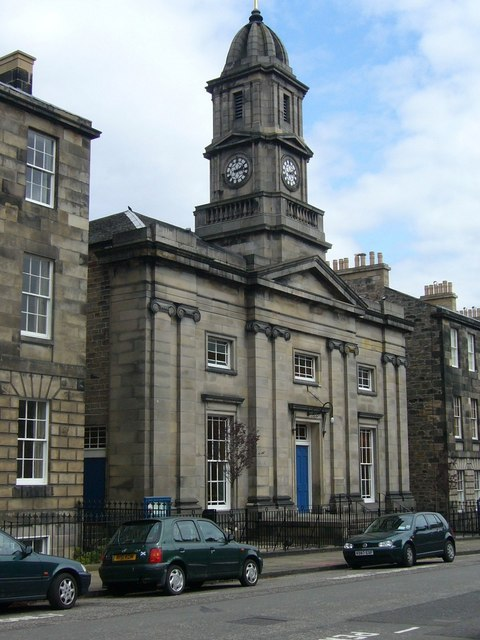
St Bernard's Church, Edinburgh

Born at 39 Abbotsford Place in Glasgow, to George Matheson (d.1891), a merchant and Jane Matheson (a second cousin), he was the eldest of eight children.

He was educated at Glasgow Academy and the University of Glasgow, where he graduated first in classics, logic and philosophy. In his twentieth year he became totally blind, but he held to his resolve to enter the ministry, and gave himself to theological and historical study.

== Ministry ==
He was licensed to preach by the Presbytery of Glasgow in 1866 and started as an assistant minister of Sandyford Parish Church. His first ministry began in 1868 at Innellan, on the Argyll coast between Dunoon and Toward. He stayed 18 years. His books on Aids to the Study of German Theology, Can the Old Faith live with the New?, The Growth of the Spirit of Christianity from the First Century to the Dawn of the Lutheran Era, established his reputation as a liberal and spiritually minded theologian; and Queen Victoria invited him to preach at Balmoral. She had his sermon on Job published.

In 1886, he moved to Edinburgh, where he became minister of St. Bernard's Parish Church in Stockbridge in place of Rev John McMurtrie. Here he did his core work as a minister. He lived slightly south at 19 St Bernards Crescent.

In 1879, he declined an invitation to the pastorate of Crown Court, London, in succession to Dr. John Gumming (1807–1881). In 1881 he was chosen as Baird lecturer, and took for his subject Natural Elements of Revealed Theology, and in 1882 he was the St Giles lecturer, his subject being Confucianism. In 1890 he was elected a fellow of the Royal Society of Edinburgh, the University of Aberdeen gave him its honorary Doctor of Laws (LL.D.), and in 1899 he was appointed Gifford lecturer by that university, but declined on grounds of health. In the same year he severed his active connection with St. Bernard's.

== Published works ==
One of his hymns, "O Love That Wilt Not Let Me Go," has passed into the popular hymnology of the Christian Church. Matheson himself wrote of the composition:

"I am quite sure that the whole work was completed in five minutes, and equally sure that it never received at my hands any retouching or correction. I have no natural gift of rhythm. All the other verses I have ever written are manufactured articles; this came like a dayspring from on high."

"O Love That Wilt Not Let Me Go" was written on the evening of Matheson’s sister’s marriage. Years before, he had been engaged, until his fiancée learned that he was going blind—that there was nothing the doctors could do—and she told him that she could not go through life with a blind man and broke off the engagement. He went blind while studying for the ministry, and his sister had been the one to care for him through the years. He was now 40, and his sister’s marriage likely brought a fresh reminder of his own heartbreak. It was in the midst of this circumstance that Matheson penned this hymn, which he said was written in five minutes. It was set to music by British organist, Albert Lister Peace in 1886.

Matheson published only one volume of verse, Sacred Songs. All of which he commented 'I simply followed the impression of the moment' His exegesis owes its interest to his subjective resources rather than to breadth of learning; his power lay in spiritual vision rather than balanced judgment, and in the vivid apprehension of the factors which make the Christian personality, rather than in constructive doctrinal statement.

== Awards ==
In 1879 the University of Edinburgh conferred upon him the honorary degree of D.D. In 1890, he became a fellow of the Royal Society of Edinburgh, upon the proposal of Sir William Thomson, Robert Flint, Hugh Macmillan and James Lindsay.

== Personal life ==
At age 20, George Matheson was engaged to be married but began going blind. When he broke the news to his fiancee, she decided she could not go through life with a blind husband.

He never married.

== Death ==
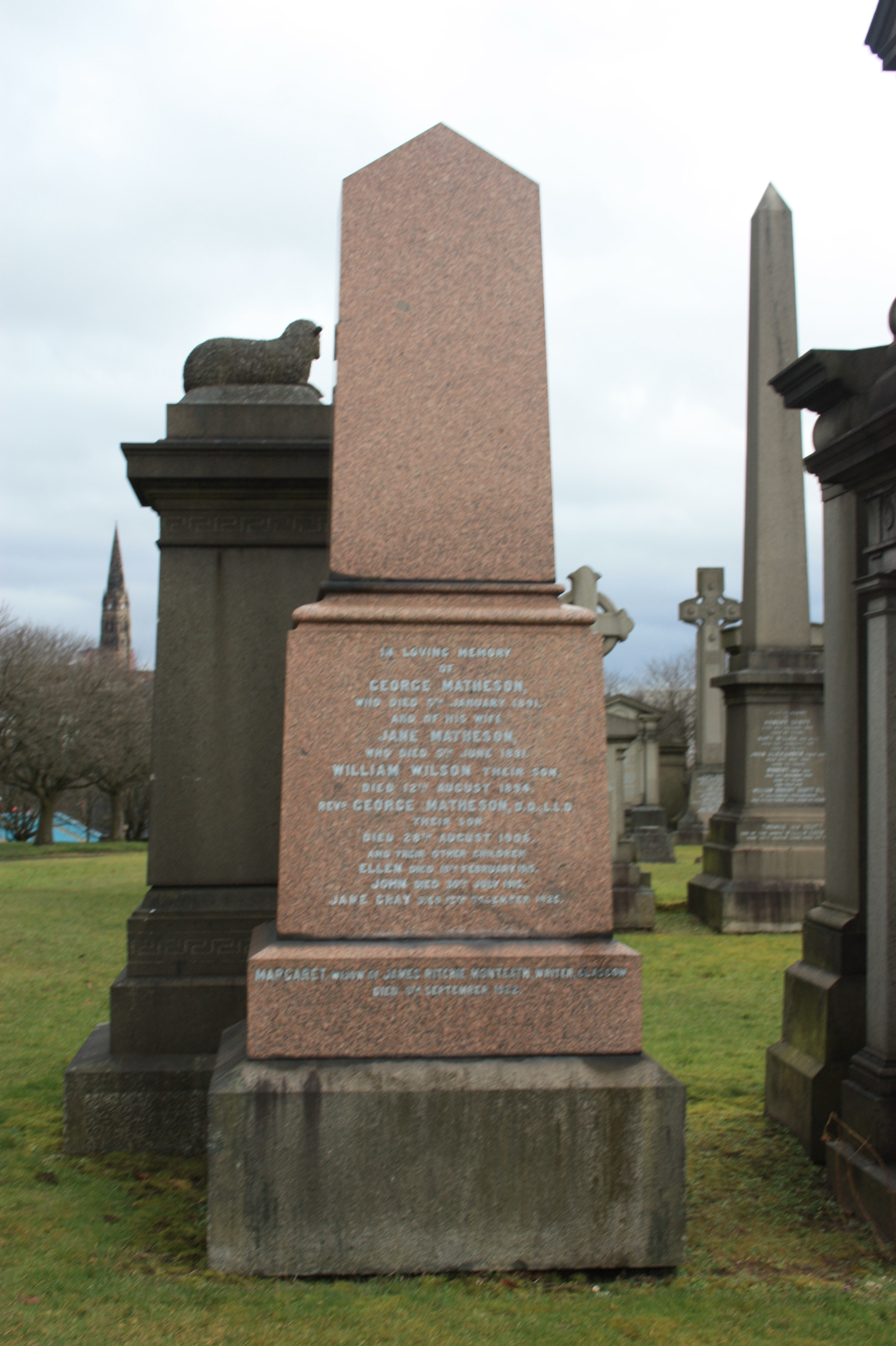
The grave of Rev George Matheson, Glasgow Necropolis

He died suddenly of apoplexy (stroke) at Avenell House in North Berwick on 28 August 1906, aged 64, in Edinburgh and is buried with his parents in the Glasgow Necropolis. The grave lies near the summit.

== Writings ==
His other writings include :

- Can the Old Faith Live with the New (1885)
- The Distinctive Message of the Old Religions (1892)
- The Psalmist & The Scientist (1887)
- Spiritual Development of St Paul (1891)
- Times of Retirement (1901)
- The Voice of the Spirit

Non-religious or broader subjects include:

- Aid to the Study of German Theology (1874)
- The Growth of the Spirit of Christianity (1877)
- Natural Elements of Revealed Theology (1881) Baird Lecture
- Confusianism (1882) St Giles Lecture
- My Aspirations (1882)
- Moments on the Mount (1884)
- The Religious Bearings of the Doctrine of Evolution (1884) a specific response to Darwin's "Origin of Species"
- Landmarks of New Testament Morality (1888)
- Sacred Songs (1890)
- Searching in the Silence (1895)
- Words by the Wayside (1896)
- The Lady Ecclesia (1896)
- Sidelights from Patmos (1897)
- Bible Definition of Religion (1898)
- Studies of the Portrait of Christ (2 volumes, 1899, 1900)
- The Sceptre without a Sword (1901)
- The Representative Men of the Bible (2 series, 1902, 1903)
- Leaves for Quiet Hours (1904)
- The Representative Men of the New Testament (1905)
- Rests by the River (1906)
- The Women of the Bible (1907)
