= Archibald Watson =

Archibald Watson may refer to:

- Archibald Watson (surgeon) (1849–1940), Australian surgeon and professor of anatomy
- Archibald Watson (mayor) (1874–1941), Australian politician, lord mayor of Brisbane, previously mayor of Toowong
- Archibald Watson (moderator) (1821–1881), minister of the Church of Scotland
