= Archibald Watson (moderator) =

Archibald Watson (1821–1881) was a minister of the Church of Scotland, who served as Moderator of the General Assembly in 1880. From 1868 to 1881 he served as chaplain to Queen Victoria in Scotland.

== Life ==
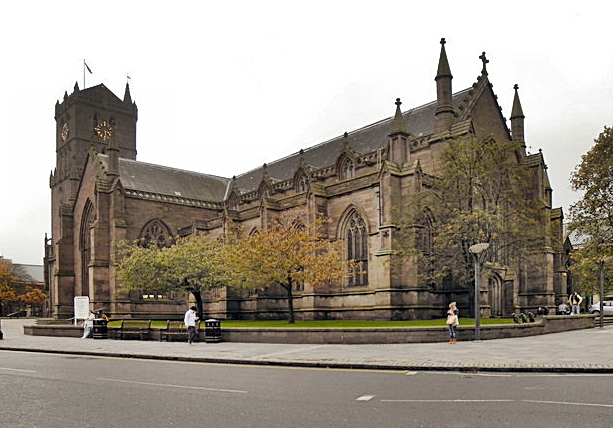
Dundee Parish Church (St Mary's)

He was born in Lochwinnoch in Renfrewshire on 9 July 1821 the first son of John Watson, a shoemaker, and his wife Annette Clullich. He was educated at the local school and then studied at Glasgow University graduating MA in 1845 and licensed to preach by the Presbytery of Irvine later that year.

His first clerical role was briefly as assistant at Beith in Ayrshire. In February 1846 he was ordained as minister of St Matthew's Church in Glasgow.

After 16 years in Glasgow in February 1862 he translated to Dundee Parish Church (St Mary's) a large parish church serving central Dundee. Whilst in this role he was also appointed chaplain to Queen Victoria in 1868.

In 1867 he accompanied Norman Macleod on a fact-finding mission, supported by the Church of Scotland, to write a report on the state of their many missions in India. Their report was presented to the General Assembly in 1868.

In 1880 he succeeded James Crystal as Moderator of the General Assembly of the Church of Scotland the highest position in the Scottish Church. He died in office but was succeeded in the following summer by James Smith of Cathcart.

He died in St Mary's manse at 54 Ferry Road in Dundee on 20 July 1881.

== Family ==
In November 1847 he married Robina Urquhart (died 1913) daughter of Rev Robert Urquhart of Kilbirnie. Their children included:

- Elizabeth (1849–1893)
- John Morrice Watson (1850–1915) a stockbroker in Dundee
- Anne (1852–54)
- Jessie Urquhart Watson (born 1854) married Rev William Rose of St Mary's Church in Partick
- Mary (1856–57)
- Archibald Watson (born 1857) a tea planter
- Robina (born 1859)
- Rev Robert Matthew Watson (born 1862) minister of Clova
- Frederick Watson (1864–1919)

== Publications ==
- Report to the General Assembly of 1868 on the Indian Missions (1868)
- Christ's Authority and Other Sermons (1883)
