= Thomas Nicol =

Scottish academic (1846–1916)

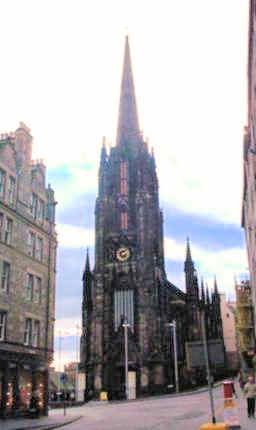
Tolbooth Church, Edinburgh (now secularised)

Thomas Nicol (1846–1916) was Professor of Biblical Criticism at the University of Aberdeen. He served as Moderator of the General Assembly of the Church of Scotland in 1914.

== Life ==
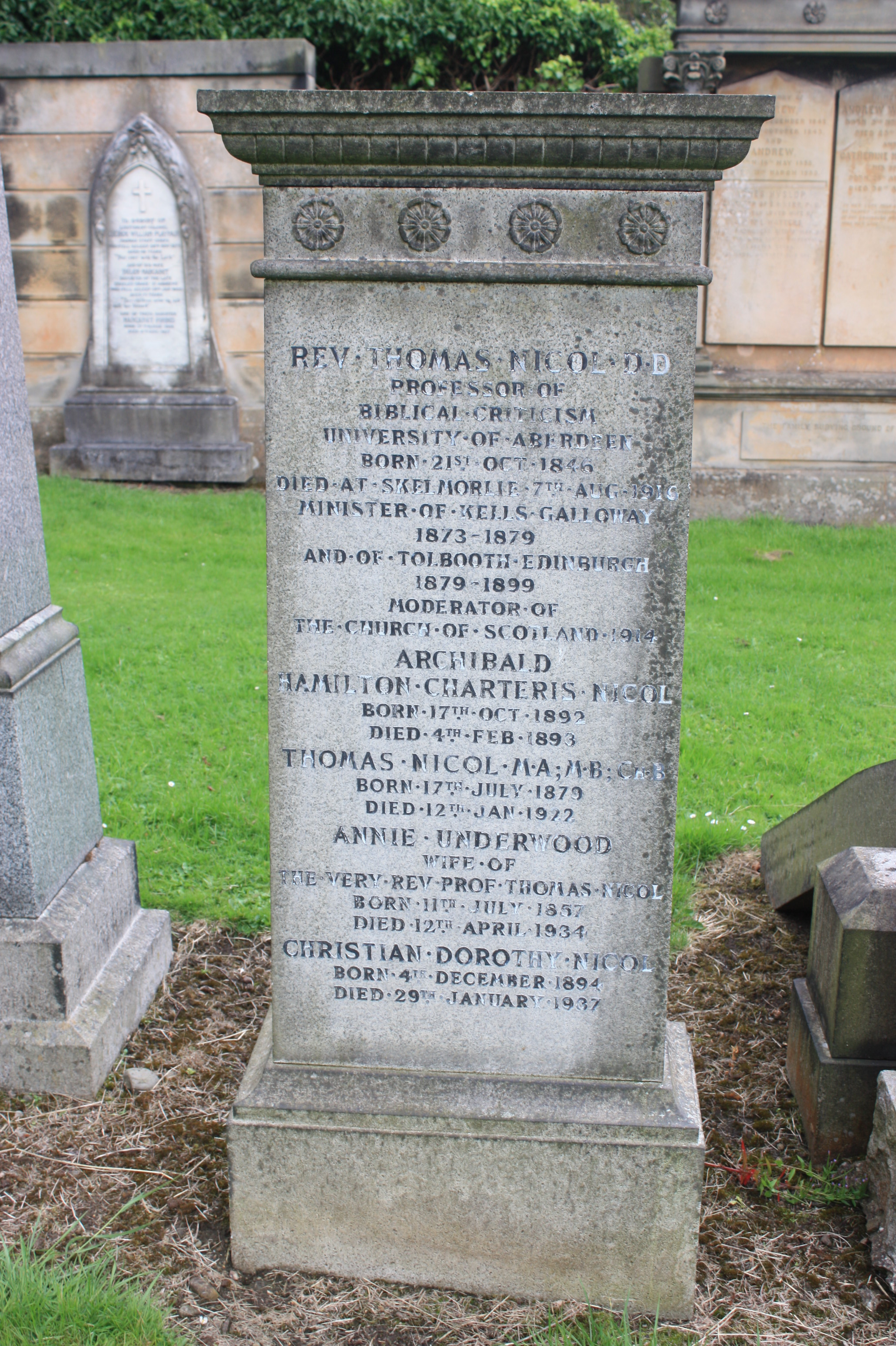
The grave of the Very Rev Thomas Nicol, Grange Cemetery, Edinburgh

He was born in Fordoun, Kincardineshire on 21 October 1846. Son of Thomas Nicol (agricultural labourer) and Christina Mackie of Fordoun, Kincardineshire, Scotland.

He was educated at Edinburgh Academy and University of Aberdeen.

He was minister of Kells in Galloway 1873 to 1879 and minister of the Tolbooth Kirk in Edinburgh 1879 to 1898/9.

In 1898 he was appointed Professor of Divinity and Biblical Criticism at the University of Aberdeen, replacing Prof David Johnston.

In 1907 he delivered The Baird Lecture entitled "The Four Gospels in the Earliest Church History".

In the early 20th century he lived at 53 College Bounds in Aberdeen.

He died at Skelmorlie on 7 August 1916 and is buried in the Grange Cemetery in Edinburgh. The grave lies close to the south-east corner.

== Family ==
He was married to Annie Underwood (1857–1934).

Their children included Thomas Nicol (1875–1972) John Underwood Nicol (1884–1946).

== Publications ==
- Recent Archaeology and the Bible (1897)
- Analytical Concordance to the Bible (1911) (with William Barron Stevenson)
- Syriac Versions of the Bible (1915)
