= Pearson McAdam Muir =

Minister in the Church of Scotland

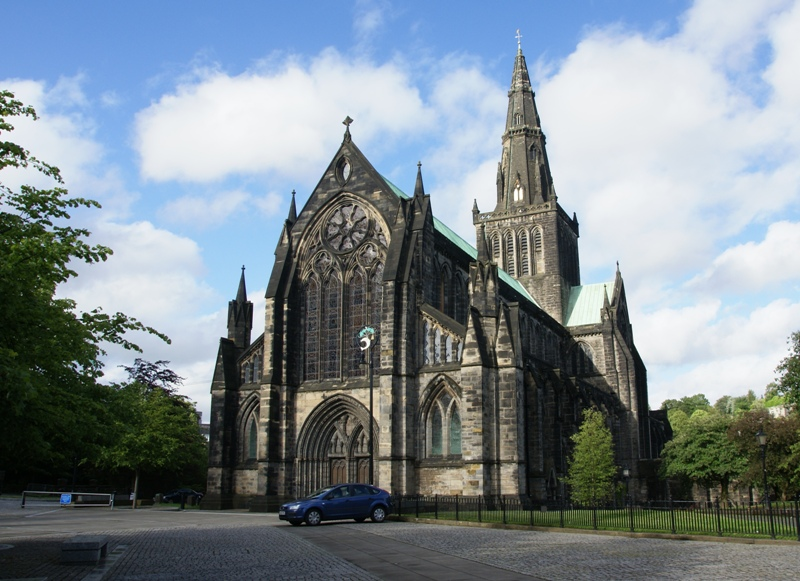
Glasgow Cathedral

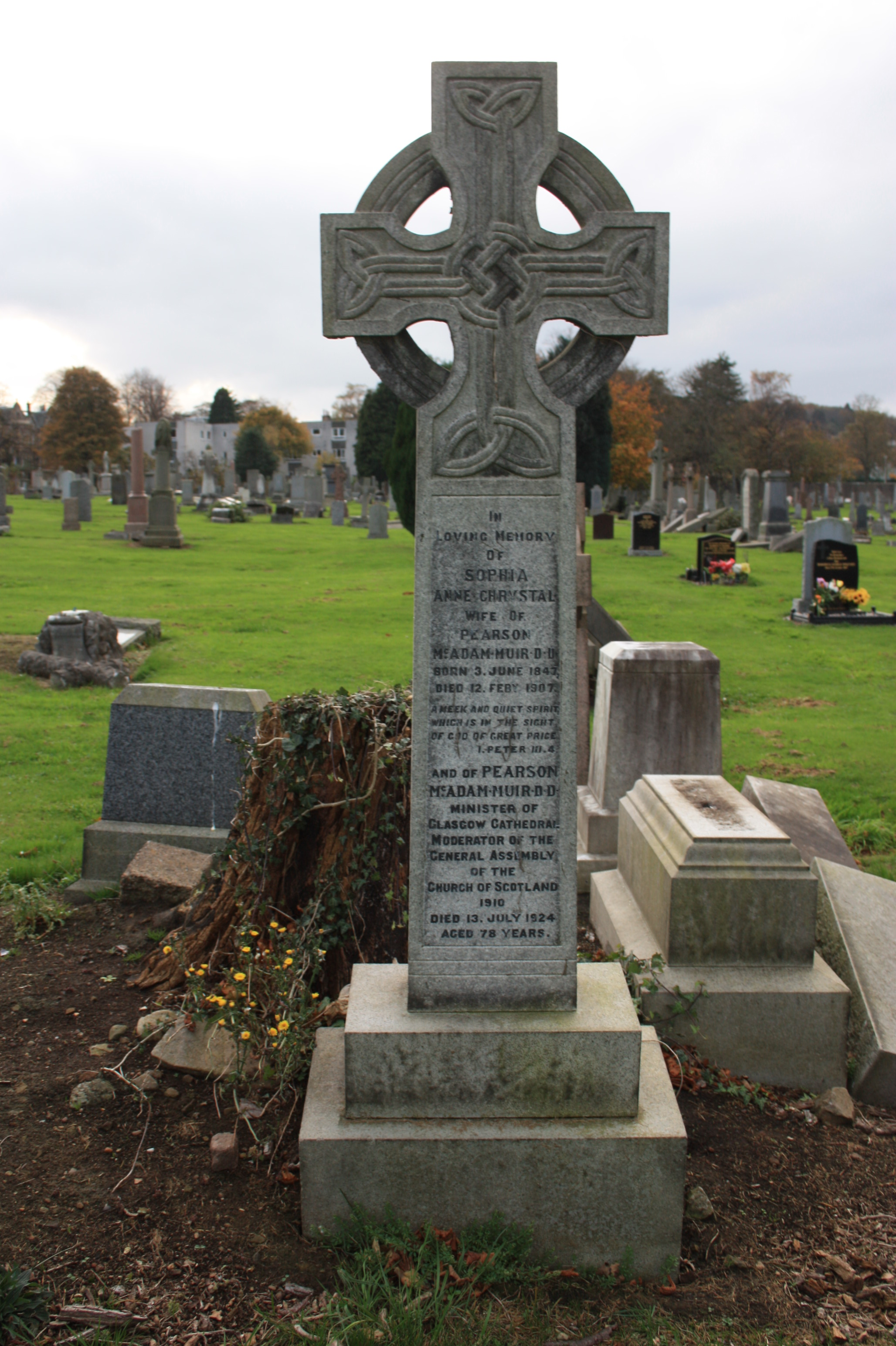
The grave of Muir, Morningside Cemetery, Edinburgh

Pearson McAdam Muir (1846–1924) was a Scottish clergyman who was the minister of Glasgow Cathedral and Moderator of the General Assembly of the Church of Scotland in 1910. He served as Grand Chaplain of the Grand Lodge of Freemasons of Scotland. He was Chaplain in Ordinary in Scotland to King Edward VII.

== Life ==
Muir was born in the manse in Kirkmabreck in Kirkcudbrightshire on 26 January 1846, the son of Rev John Muir (1805–1858) and his wife, Gloriana Pearson McAdam (1806–1888). He was educated at Glasgow High School. He then studied divinity at Glasgow University. He was licensed to preach in December 1868 and began his ministry assisting consecutively in Monkton, Ayrshire, before moving to Prestwick and then Stevenston.

His first sole charge was to Catrine in 1870. He was minister at Polmont near Falkirk 1872 to 1880, replacing John Wightman Ker, then moved to Morningside, Edinburgh to his first major city church. In 1893 Glasgow University awarded him an honorary doctorate (DD). In 1896 he was requested to replace the Rev George Stewart Burns at Glasgow Cathedral.

In 1909 Muir was appointed army chaplain to the Cameronians (Scottish Rifles). Also in 1909 he gave The Baird Lecture his topic being "Modern Substitutes for Christianity".

In 1910 , Muir succeeded James Robertson of Whittingehame as Moderator of the General Assembly, the highest position within the Church of Scotland.

He retired to Edinburgh and died in 1924. He is buried in Morningside Cemetery, Edinburgh.

== Family ==
Muir married Sophia Ann Chrystal (died 1907) in 1871; she was the daughter of James Chrystal, himself moderator in 1879. They had five children.

== Publications ==
- Samuel Rutherford (1881)
- History of the Church of Scotland (1890)
- Religious Writers of England (1898)
- Monuments and Inscriptions in Glasgow Cathedral (1898)
- Modern Substitutes for Christianity (1909)
