= Adam Cleghorn Welch =

Scottish clergyman and biblical scholar

Adam Cleghorn Welch (14 May 1864 – 19 February 1943) was a Scottish clergyman and biblical scholar.

After studying in the Synod Hall of the United Presbyterian Church, he served in the ministry for 26 years. In 1909, he was awarded an honorary Th.D. from Germany for his 1901 publication of Anselm and His Work. From 1907 to 1911, he held the convenership for the College Committee of the United Free Church. In 1913, he became professor of Old Testament at New College, Edinburgh, retiring in 1934. From 1933 to 1934 he was appointed the Baird Lecturer, and in 1934 he was president of the Society for Old Testament Study. In 1938 he delivered the Schweich Lectures on Biblical Archaeology. He died at Helensburgh, Dunbartonshire.

== Bibliography ==
- The Work of the Chronicler (1939)
- Prophet and Priest in Old Israel (1936)
- Post-exilic Judaism (1935)
- The Code of Deuteronomy (1924)
- The Story of Joseph (1913)
- The Religion of Israel Under the Kingdom (1912)
- Anselm and His Work (1901)
