= The Baird Lecture =

The Baird Lecture is a lectureship that was endowed by James Baird to promote the Christian religion.

== History and endowment ==
In 1873 James Baird established The Baird Trust and gave into its care £500,000 to be used for aggressive Christian work. A part of the income of this fund was to provide for a series of lectures in Glasgow and also, if required, at one other of the Scottish university towns. Each course was to be delivered by a minister of the Church of Scotland, who could be reappointed, and was to consist of at least six lectures.

== Catalogue of titles ==
- 1873: The Inspiration of the Holy Scriptures, by Robert Jamieson
- 1874: The Mysteries of Christianity, by Thomas Jackson Crawford
- 1875: Endowed Territorial Work, by William Smith
- 1876: Theism, by Robert Flint
- 1877: Anti-Theistic Theories, by Robert Flint
- 1879: Messianic Prophecy, by Paton James Gloag
- 1880: Historical Development of Supernatural Religion, by John Christie
- 1881: Natural Elements of Revealed Theology, by George Matheson
- 1882: The Westminster Assembly, by Alexander Ferrier Mitchell
- 1883: St Paul’s Use of the Terms Flesh and Spirit, by Prof Wm Dickson
- 1885: The Revelation of St John, by Prof William Milligan
- 1887: The Church of Christ, by Prof Archibald Hamilton Charteris
- 1889: Early Religion of Israel, by Prof J Robertson
- 1891: The Ascension and Heavenly Priesthood of our Lord, by Prof Wm Milligan
- 1892: Sacrifice: Its Prophecy and Fulfilment, by Archibald Scott
- 1895: The Scottish Church in Christendom, by Prof H Cowan
- 1897: Apostolic ministry in the Scottish Church, by Prof Robert Herbert Story
- 1899: The Scottish Reformation, by Alexander Ferrier Mitchell
- 1901: The Church and its Social Mission, by Very Rev J Marshall Lang
- 1903: The Ministry and Sacraments of the Church of Scotland, by Very Revd Donald Macleod
- 1905: The Rule of Faith, by Prof W P Paterson
- 1907: The Four Gospels in the Earliest Church History, by Prof Thomas Nicol
- 1909: Modern Substitutes for Christianity, by Very Rev Pearson McAdam Muir
- 1911: New Testament Criticism: Its History and Results, by Revd J A McClymont
- 1913: Christian Freedom, by Prof W M McGregor
- 1915: The Apostles of India, by Revd James Nicoll Ogilvie
- 1917: The Idea of Immortality, by Prof G Galloway
- 1920: The Christian Vindication of Patriotism, by Robert Stevenson
- 1922: Jeremiah, by Prof George Adam Smith
- 1924: Religious Experience, by R H Fisher
- 1926: Music in Church Worship, by G W Stewart
- 1928: The Idealism of Christian Ethics, by G Walker
- 1929: The New Testament and its Transmission, by Prof George Milligan
- 1932: The Riddle of the World, by Prof David S Cairns
- 1934: Post Exilic Judaism, by Prof Adam Welch
- 1935: Parish and Parish Church, by Revd P D Thomson
- 1942: Youth in the new Order, by W M Wightman
- 1946: New Forms of the Old Faith, by Revd James Black
- 1947: The Chaplains in the Church of Scotland, by Revd T B Stewart Thomson
- 1949: The Epistle to the Hebrews, by Prof Wm Manson
- 1950: Church and Ministry, by Prof G. D. Henderson
- 1955: A History of Worship in the Church of Scotland, by Revd W D Maxwell
- 1960: Christian Faith and the Providential Order, by Rev Archibald Campbell Craig
- 1965: History and Duties of the Office of Elder, by Rev G M Dryburgh
- 1971: Ethics in a Permissive Society, by Prof Wm Barclay
- 1975: Message, Media, Mission, by Revd R F Falconer
- 1978: Saltire and Thistle, by Revd J.BP Bulloch
- 1985: Kirk by Divine Right, by Very Rev Andrew Herron
- 1990: Music’s Magic Lost: Can it be regained?, by Revd Ian Mackenzie
- 2004: Netting Citizens, by Rev. Johnston McKay
- 2007: Celebrating 150 years of Scottish Scholarship
- 2009: What should they know of preaching who only preaching know? by Very Revd Dr Andrew McLellan
