= Alexander Ferrier Mitchell =

Scottish ecclesiastical historian

Alexander Ferrier Mitchell (1822–1899) was a Scottish ecclesiastical historian and Moderator of the General Assembly of the Church of Scotland in 1885.

== Life ==
He was born at Brechin on 10 September 1822, son of David Mitchell, convener of local guilds, and his wife Elizabeth, daughter of James Ferrier of Broadmyre. After being educated at Brechin grammar school, he proceeded in 1837 to St. Mary's College, St. Andrews, winning an entrance bursary in classics. He graduated M.A. in 1841, and in 1844 was licensed to preach.

After acting as assistant to the ministers at Meigle and Dundee, he was in 1847 ordained by Meigle presbytery to the charge of Dunnichen. Adhering to the established church during the secession movement, he became in 1848 a member of the general assembly. In the same year, when only 26, he was appointed professor of Hebrew in St. Mary's College, where he innovated in teaching methods. As convener from 1856 to 1875 of the committee of the mission to the Jews, Mitchell did much to develop missions in the Levant, which he visited himself in 1857. His main interests lay, however, in Scottish ecclesiastical history, and in 1868 he succeeded John Cook as professor of divinity and ecclesiastical history in St. Mary's College.

Mitchell held his chair for 26 years, and during that period published a number of works on Scottish ecclesiastical history. He was an active member of the Scottish Historical and Text Societies, and took a prominent part in the general councils of the Presbyterian Alliance, attending the meeting at Philadelphia in 1880. In 1885 he was elected moderator of the church of Scotland, and the address he delivered at the close of the session was separately published (Edinburgh and London, 1885). In 1894 he retired from his professorship. He was made D.D. of St. Andrews in 1862, and honorary LL.D. of Glasgow in 1892. He divided his later years between his house at Gowan Park, near Brechin, and 56 South Street, St Andrews.

He died at St. Andrews on 22 March 1899, and was buried in Brechin Cathedral churchyard.

== Family ==
In 1852 he married Margaret Tweedie Johnstone, the eldest daughter of Michael Johnstone of Archbank, near Moffat, and was survived by three sons and four daughters, including Robert Haldane Mitchell.

== Works ==
Mitchell published:

- The Westminster Confession of Faith, 1866; 3rd ed. 1867.
- The Wedderburns and their Work, 1867.
- Minutes of the Westminster Assembly (with John Struthers), 1874.
- The Westminster Assembly (Baird Lectures), London, 1883; new edit. Philadelphia, 1895.
- Catechisms of the Church of Scotland, Edinburgh, 1886.
- The Scottish Reformation, ed. D. Hay Fleming, with biographical sketch by Dr. James Christie, London, 1900.

Mitchell also edited for the Scottish Text Society the Richt Vey to Heuine, by John Gau, in 1888, and the Gude and Godlie Ballatis from the 1567 version in 1897. For the Scottish Historical Society he edited in 1892 and 1896 two volumes of The Records of the Commissions of the General Assembly, 1646–50. He also published an edition of Archbishop Hamilton's Catechism (1882), and three lectures at St. Giles's, Edinburgh (St. Giles's Lectures, 1st ser. No. 4, 4th ser. No. 1, and 6th ser. No. 8).
