= Robert Flint (theologian) =

British theologian (1838–1910)

Reverend Professor Robert Flint FRSE FBA

Professor of Divinity, University of Edinburgh
- In office 1876–1903

Professor of Moral Philosophy and Political Economy, University of St Andrews
- In office 1864–1876

Personal details
- Born: 14 March 1838 Greenburn, Sibbaldbie, Dumfriesshire, Scotland
- Died: 25 November 1910 (aged 72) Edinburgh, Scotland
- Occupation: Theologian, philosopher, sociologist

Robert Flint (14 March 1838 – 25 November 1910), commonly referred to as Professor Flint was a Scottish theologian and philosopher who wrote also on sociology.

== Life ==
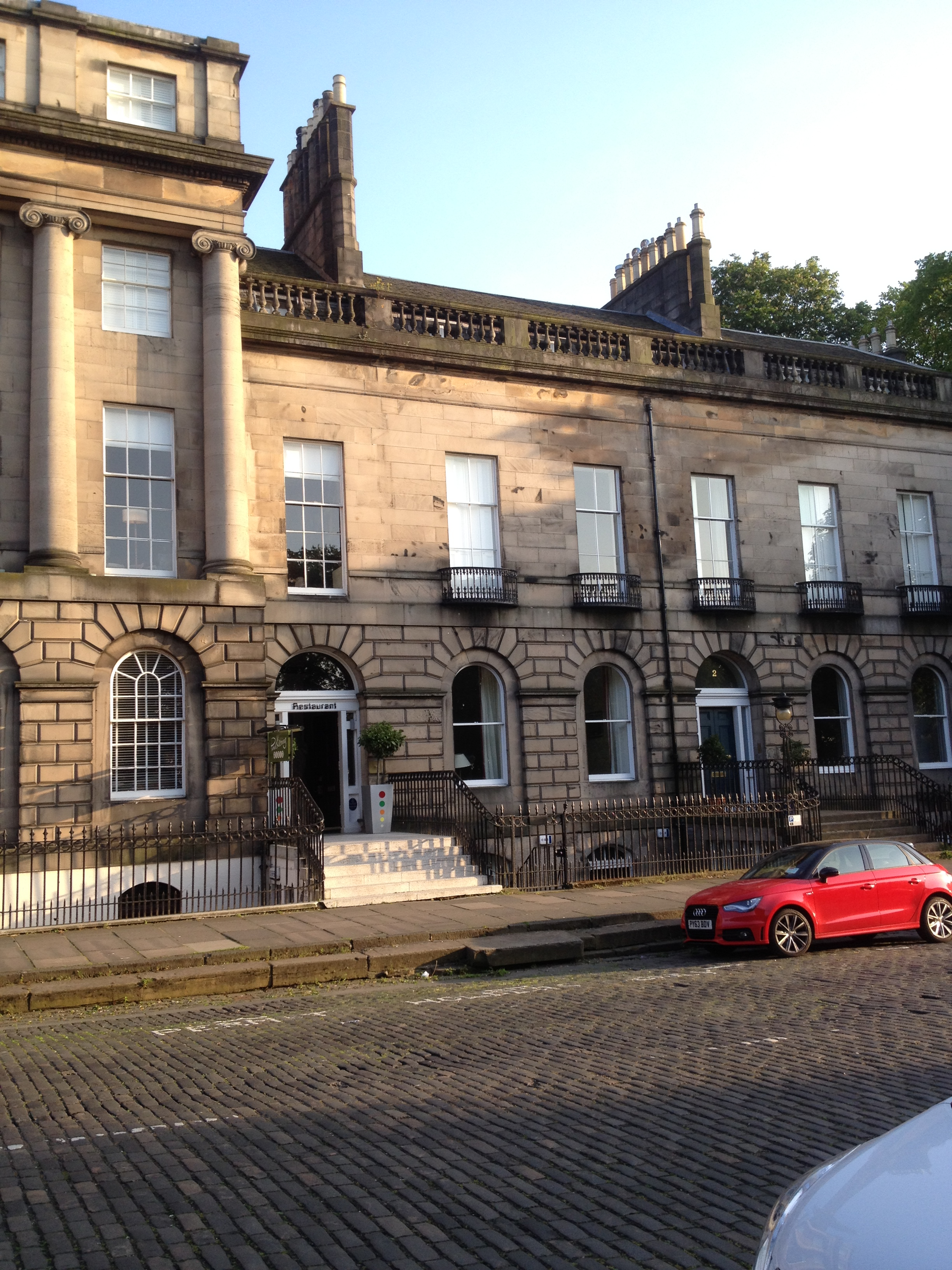
Flint's home at 3 Royal Terrace, Edinburgh

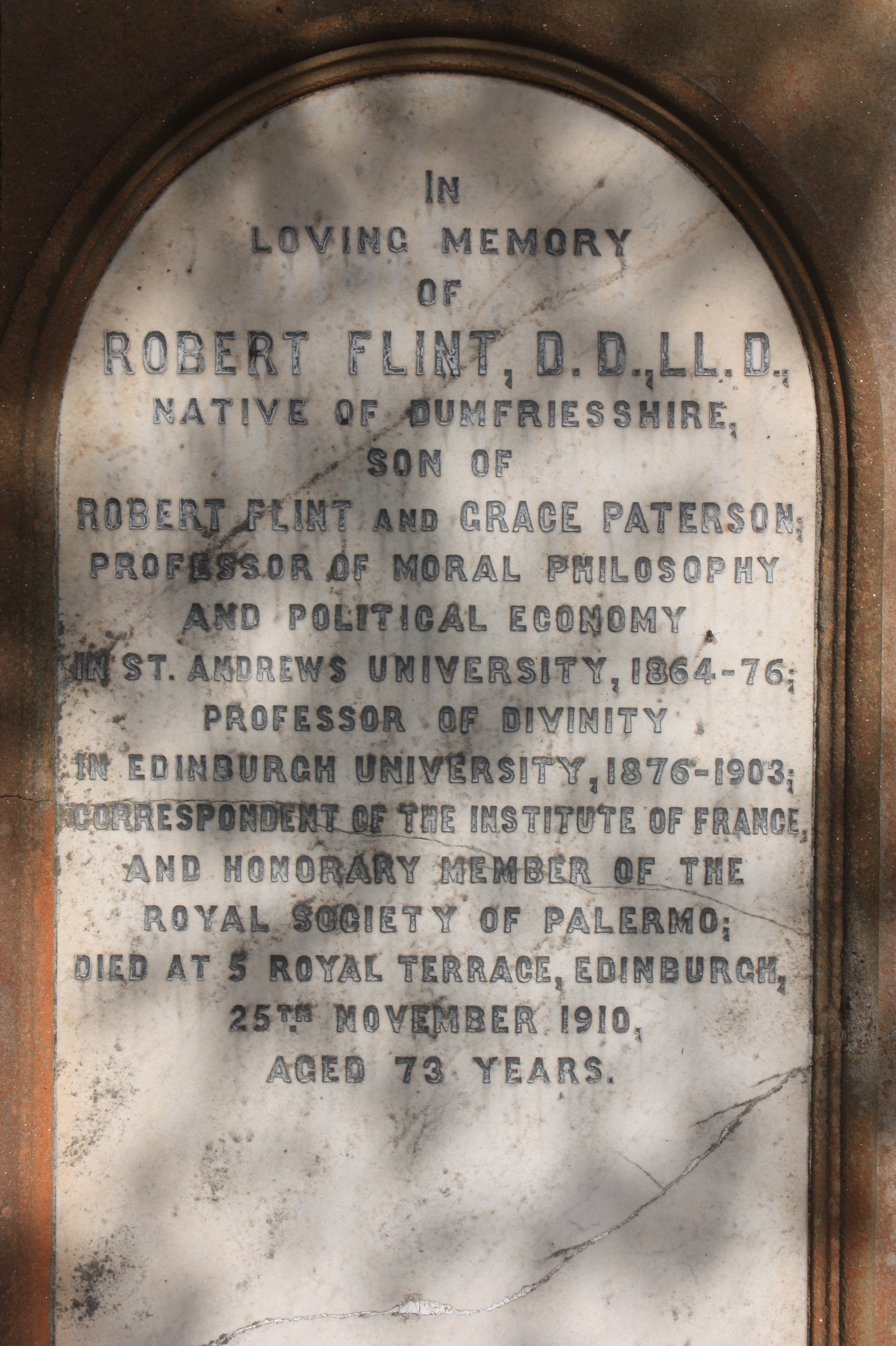
The grave of Prof Robert Flint, Liberton Cemetery, Edinburgh

Flint was born at Greenburn, Sibbaldbie near Applegarth in Dumfriesshire on 14 March 1838, the son of Grace Johnston (née Paterson) and Robert Flint, a farm overseer. His first school was at Evan Water then he moved to Moffat. In 1852, he entered the University of Glasgow where he distinguished himself (without graduating) in arts and divinity.

Having been employed as a lay missionary by the 'Elders' Association of Glasgow', Flint was licensed to preach as a Church of Scotland minister by the Presbytery of Glasgow in June 1858, and for a short time acted as assistant to Norman Macleod, at the Barony Church, Glasgow. He was minister of the East Church, Aberdeen from 1859 to 1862, and of Kilconquhar church in Fife from 1862 to 1864, a small country village parish, which gave him leisure for study, improved by visits to Germany.

On the death of James Frederick Ferrier in 1864, Flint was elected to succeed him in the moral philosophy chair at the University of St Andrews, among the competing candidates being Thomas Hill Green. This chair he held till 1876, when he succeeded Thomas Jackson Crawford in the divinity chair of the University of Edinburgh. On this appointment he was awarded doctorates by both the University of Glasgow (LLD) and the University of Edinburgh (DD). Thomas Chalmers had similarly migrated from the one chair to the other.

Flint was appointed to a number of foundation lectureships. He was Baird lecturer (1876–77); in 1880 he travelled to America, and delivered a course as Stone lecturer at Princeton University; in 1887–88 he was Croall lecturer. He was elected on 21 May 1883 corresponding member of the Institute of France (Académie des sciences morales et politiques), and was elected a Fellow of the Royal Society of Edinburgh in 1880. His proposers were Sir Robert Christison, Sir Alexander Grant, Alexander Campbell Fraser and Peter Guthrie Tait. He served as Vice President to the Society for three sessions: 1886–92; 1893–99; and 1902–07.

He resigned his chair in 1903 to devote himself to literary work, a purpose hampered by failing health. His post was filled by Rev Prof William Paterson Paterson (later Moderator of the General Assembly of the Church of Scotland.)

For some time he lived at Musselburgh. He was scheduled to deliver the Gifford lectures at Edinburgh in 1907, but was unable due to illness.

Flint died, unmarried, at his residence, 5 Royal Terrace, Edinburgh, on 25 November 1910. In 2015 the building was occupied by a restaurant and hotel.

He is buried against the eastern wall of the old south section of Liberton Cemetery in south Edinburgh.

== Artistic recognition ==
His sketch portrait of 1884 (wearing armour), by William Brassey Hole, is held by the Scottish National Portrait Gallery.

== Works ==
- Christ's Kingdom upon Earth (1865) sermons
- The Philosophy of History in Europe, vol. I: The Philosophy of History in France and Germany (1874)
- Theism (1877) Baird Lectures 1876/7; 7th edition, revised (1889)
- Anti-Theistic Theories (1879) Baird Lectures 1876/7
- Vico (1884)
- Historical Philosophy in France and French Belgium and Switzerland (1893)
- Socialism (1894)
- Sermons and Addresses (1899)
- Agnosticism (1903)
- Philosophy as scientia scientarum and a history of classifications of the sciences (1904)
- On theological, Biblical, and other subjects (1905)
