= Christopher New =

English academic, author and philosopher

Christopher New is an English academic, author and philosopher.

In 1969, New became the head of the philosophy department at The University of Hong Kong. He is the author of the historical novel series, The China Coast Trilogy, which deals with the British presence in China during the 20th century. New has also written novels set in India, Egypt and Europe. He currently divides his time between Asia and Europe.

== Bibliography ==
=== China Coast Trilogy ===
- Shanghai. Summit Books. 1985. ISBN 0-671-42197-2.
- The Chinese Box. Soho Press. 2002. ISBN 962-8783-06-8.
- A Change of Flag. Soho Press. 2002. ISBN 962-7160-95-4.

=== Other novels ===
- The Kaminsky Cure, Saqi. 2005. ISBN 0-86356-531-X
- The Road to Maridur, Asia2000. 2002. ISBN 962-8783-23-8
- A Small Place in the Desert, Asia2000. 2004. ISBN 962-8783-34-3
- Goodbye Chairman Mao, New English Library. 1980. ISBN 0-450-04619-2
- Gage Street Courtesan, Earnshaw Books. 2013. ISBN 978-988-16163-5-7
- Chinese Spring, Contraband. 2019. ISBN 978-191-22351-4-8

=== Philosophy ===
Book

- The Philosophy of Literature: An Introduction, Routledge. 1999. ISBN 0-415-14485-X

Journals

- New, C.G. (1 July 1966). "IV.—A Plea for Linguistics". Mind. 75 (299): 368–384. doi:10.1093/mind/LXXV.299.368.
- New, Christopher (April 1974). "Saints, Heroes and Utilitarians". Philosophy. 49 (188): 179–189. doi:10.1017/S0031819100048051.
- New, Christopher (January 1992). "Time and Punishment". Analysis. 52 (1): 35–40. doi:10.2307/3328880. JSTOR 3328880.
- New, Christopher (June 1993). "Antitheism: A Reflection". Ratio. 6 (1): 36–43. doi:10.1111/j.1467-9329.1993.tb00051.x.
- New, Christopher (January 1995). "Punishing Times: Reply to Smilansky". Analysis. 55 (1): 60–62. doi:10.2307/3328621. JSTOR 3328621.
- New, Christopher (Autumn 1997). "A Note on Truth in Fiction". The Journal of Aesthetics and Art Criticism. 55 (4): 421–423. doi:10.2307/430930. JSTOR 430930.
