= Sibbaldbie =

Coordinates: 55.176°N 3.3423°W

- Location within Dumfries and Galloway
- Council area: Dumfries and Galloway
- Country: Scotland
- Sovereign state: United Kingdom
- Police: Scotland
- Fire: Scottish
- Ambulance: Scottish

Sibbaldbie is a small village in Annandale, Dumfries and Galloway, Scotland.

== History ==
The village is an ancient parish was incorporated into that of Applegarthtown in 1609. In 1882, the village had a school with 65 students. Sibbaldbie Church was established in the 12th century but was allowed to fall into ruin after 1609. The cemetery and kirkyard remain.
