= John Gau (translator) =

Scottish translator (c. 1495 – 1553)

John Gau (Note: The most recently published reliable source, the Oxford Dictionary of National Biography, spells his last name Gaw. Other authorities cited here use Gau.) (c. 1495 – 1553), Scottish translator, was born in Perth towards the close of the 15th century. He was educated in St Salvator's College, St Andrews. He appears to have been in residence in Malmö, Sweden, in 1533, perhaps as chaplain to the Scots community there. It was there that he wrote the work for which he is known, The Richt vay to the Kingdome of Heuine.

In 1536 Gau married a Malmö citizen's daughter, bearing the Christian name Birgitta. She died in 1551, and he in or about 1553.

== Richt Vay ==
In 1533 John Hochstraten, the exiled Antwerp printer, issued a book by Gau entitled The Richt vay to the Kingdome of Heuine ("The Right way to the Kingdom of Heaven"), of which the chief interest is that it is the first Scottish book written on the side of the Reformers, but it became just one of several translations of Lutheran prose works attacking the Scottish church. It is a translation of Christiern Pedersen's Den rette vey till Hiemmerigis Rige (Antwerp, 1531), for the most part direct, but showing intimate knowledge in places of the German edition by Urbanus Rhegius. Only one copy of Gau's text is extant, in the National Library of Scotland. It has been assumed that all the copies were shipped from Malmö to Scotland, and that the cargo was intercepted by the Scottish officers on the look out for the heretical works which were printed abroad in large numbers. This may explain the silence of all the historians of the Reformed Church: John Knox, David Calderwood and John Spottiswoode.

The first reference to the Richt Vay appeared in George Chalmers's Caledonia, ii. 616. Chalmers, who was the owner of the unique volume before it passed into the Britwell Court collection, considered it to be an original work. The antiquary David Laing printed extracts for the Bannatyne Club (Miscellany, iii., 1855). The evidence that the book is a translation was first given by Sonnenstein Wendt in a paper "Om Reformatorerna i Malmö," in Rördam’s Ny Kirkehistoriske Samlinger, ii. (Copenhagen, 1860). A complete edition was edited by Alexander Ferrier Mitchell for the Scottish Text Society (1888). See also Life of Patrick Hamilton by Peter Lorimer.

== Legacy ==
The online magazine The Bottle Imp established the John Gau of Malmö Prize to recognise and encourage the study of Scottish literature in the Nordic region.
