= James Chrystal =

Scottish minister

James Chrystal or Crystal (1807–1901) was a Scottish minister who served as Moderator of the General Assembly of the Church of Scotland from 1879 to 1880.

== Life ==
He was born in 1807 on Cochrane Street in Glasgow, the second son of William Chrystal, the rector of Glasgow Grammar School. He was educated at the Grammar School then studied at the University of Glasgow graduating MA in 1825.

He was licensed to preach by the Presbytery of Glasgow in 1829 and presented to the congregation of Auchinleck in Ayrshire by Sir James Boswell of Auchinleck on 25 April 1833, being ordained there on 19 September 1833.

He was sometimes Clerk of Presbytery. He was awarded an honorary Doctor of Divinity (D.D.) by Glasgow University in 1861); and an honorary Doctor of Laws by St Andrews University in 1893). He is mentioned in 1835 as donating £3 3s 6d from Auchinleck to general church funds of the Church of Scotland under the remit of Thomas Chalmers.

In 1838 he is listed as a formal dinner guest in Cumnock.

In 1879 he succeeded The Very Reverend John Tulloch as Moderator of the General Assembly the highest position within the Church of Scotland.

He was minister of Auchinleck from 1833 to 1893, 60 years service, being replaced by Rev James Hill.

He died on 6 February 1901 as Father of the Church.

== Family ==
In October 1834 he married Sophia Playfair (d. 1890) daughter of Patrick Playfair of Dalmarnock a Glasgow merchant trading with the West Indies. Their children included William (1835-1845); Jane Playfair (1837-1884); Patrick Chrystal (1838-1885); James Robert Chrystal (b.1839) minister of Coltness; Andrew (1841-1885) merchant in Montreal; David (1843-1857); John Smith Chrystal (b. 1845); Sophia Ann (b. 1847) married Rev Pearson McAdam Muir (moderator in 1910).
