= Church of Scotland Yearbook =

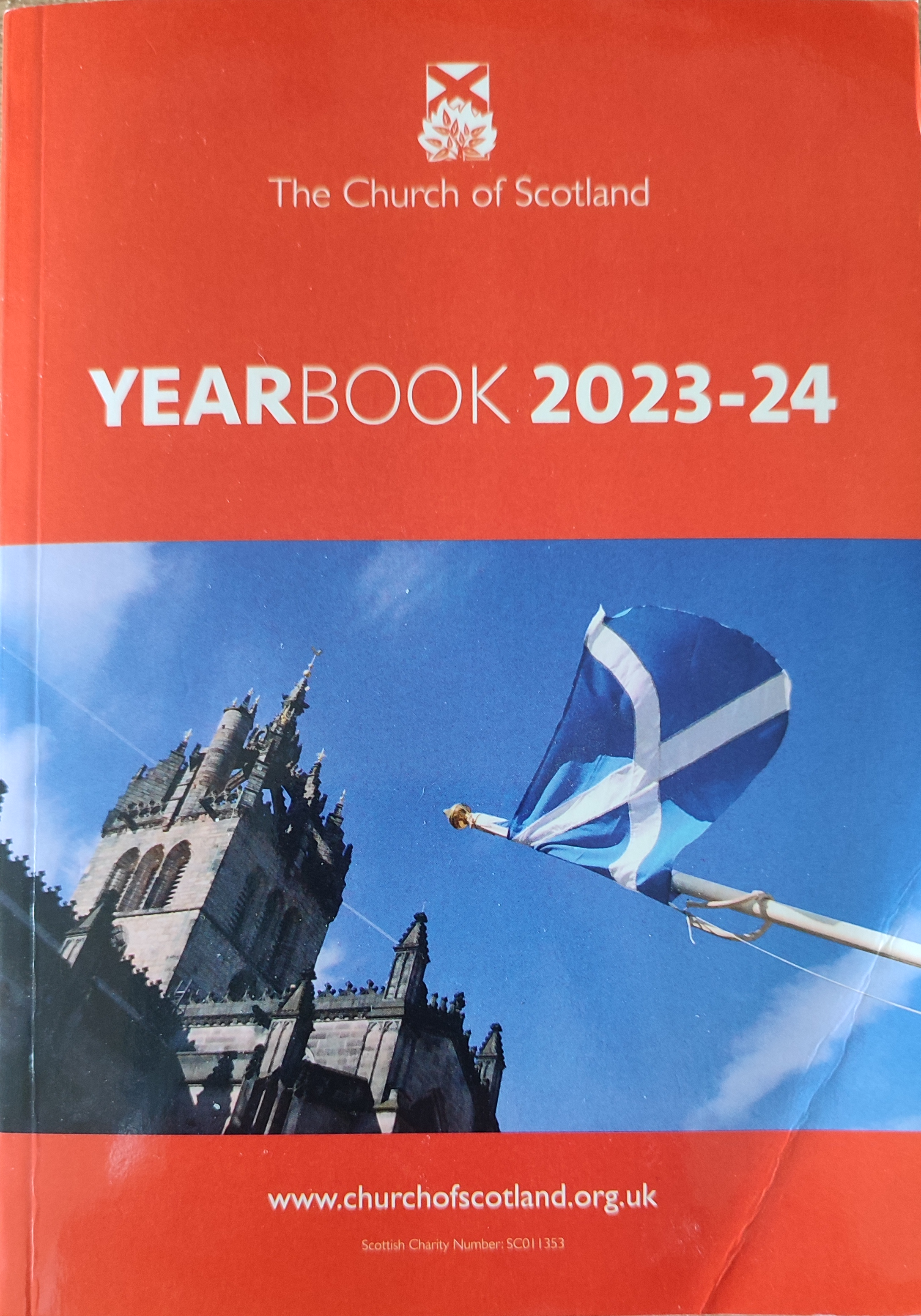
Church of Scotland Yearbook, 2023-2024

The Church of Scotland Yearbook (known informally as the Red Book because of its red binding) is a collection of statistical data published annually by the Church of Scotland. It was first published in 1886, and has been published annually ever since. A new free version is sent to every minister each year, although it can also be purchased by the general public.

It contains contact information for every minister, as well as contact details for the church offices, clerks, and general personnel.

The largest section is a list of every congregation, sorted into alphabetical order within their respective Presbytery. For each congregation, the contact details for the congregation and minister is given (or Interim Moderator, for when a congregation is vacant). At the end of each Presbytery List is also listed other ministry staff who work within the bounds (such as chaplains for the military or hospitals), as well as a separate list for retired clergy.

Another main section contains the congregational statistics for every parish in the Church of Scotland, and gives the following information, again sorted by Presbytery:

- Number of communicants (members) at the end of the previous year
- Number of elders at the end of the previous year
- Membership numbers of the Church of Scotland Guild
- Parish's ordinary general income for the prior year.
- Ministries and Mission charge [now called 'Giving to Grow'], which is the amount each congregation is to give to central funds to pay towards ministry and the denomination.
- Number of young people (under the age of eighteen) involved in the life of the congregation

The final main section is a list of all ministers (both working and retired), sorted alphabetically by surname.

There are a number of smaller sections which are not included in the printed edition (but have in previous versions). These can be found on the main Church of Scotland website.

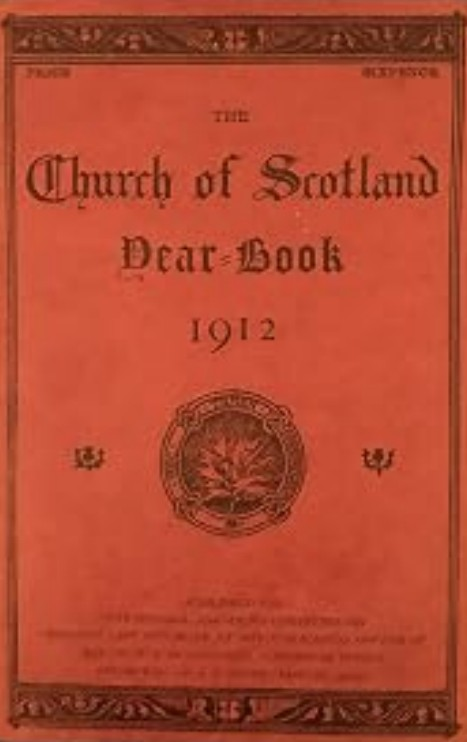
Cover of the 1912 edition

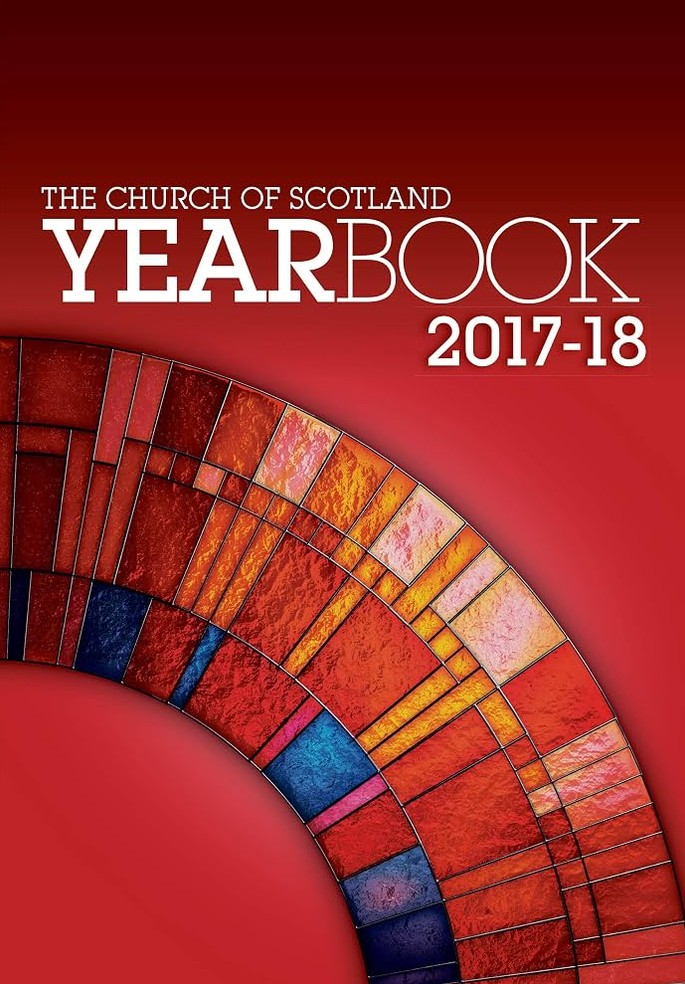
Cover of the 2017 edition
