= Paul Methuen (reformer) =

Scottish reformer

Paul Methuen (or Methven) (fl. 1566), was a Scottish reformer.

Methuen was originally a baker in Dundee, was an early convert to the new Protestant doctrines. Although imperfectly educated, his eloquence and intimate acquaintance with scripture enabled him to render such good service to the Protestant cause that he became obnoxious both to the prelates and the secret council; and the latter not only issued an order for his apprehension, but also forbade the people to listen to his orations or to harbour him in their houses. The Regent, Mary of Guise, ordered his arrest, which he avoided through prior warning by Provost Haliburton. To show their disappointment at his escape, the secret council fined the town of Dundee in the sum of 2,000l. During the war between Scotland and England, which began in the autumn of 1556, and continued through the following year, the Protestants enjoyed considerable liberty, and their numbers rapidly increased. Methuen, William Harlaw, John Douglas, and John Willock now began to preach with greater publicity in different parts of Scotland. On 10 May 1559 Methuen and other prominent reformers were put on trial before the justiciary court at Stirling for usurping the ministerial office, for administering without the consent of their ordinaries the sacrament of the altar in a manner different from that of the Catholic Church, in the burghs of Dundee and Montrose, and for convening the subjects of the realm in those places, preaching to them erroneous doctrines, and exciting seditions and tumults. Being found guilty, he was 'denounced rebel and put to the horn as fugitive'.

He was nominated by the lords of the congregation to the church of Jedburgh, Roxburghshire, 19 July 1560, in which year and the following he was a member of assembly. He was deposed from his incumbency, with some difficulty, towards the end of 1562, for adultery with his servant, and sentence of excommunication was also pronounced against him. Thereupon he fled to England and resumed his ministerial office there. In 1563 it was declared in the assembly that he was 'verie sorrowful for his grievous offence, and wald underly whatever punishment the kirk would lay upon him,' which declaration, on 27 Dec. 1564, 'the haill Assemblie with ane voyce are content to receive.' After an absence of upwards of two years the assembly, on 26 June 1566, ordained his public repentance. He was ordered to appear at the church door of Edinburgh when the second bell rang for public worship, clothed in sackcloth, bare-headed and bare-footed; to stand there until the prayer and psalms were finished; when he was to be brought into the church to hear the sermon, during which he was to be 'placeit in the publick spectakill [stool of repentance] above the peiple.' He was to repeat this procedure at Dundee and Jedburgh, where he had officiated as minister. Methuen went through a part of this discipline, but being overwhelmed with shame, or despairing to regain his lost reputation, he stopped in the midst of it, and again returned to England.
