= Andrew Herron =

Scottish minister

Andrew Herron (29 September 1909–27 February 2003) was a Scottish Church of Scotland minister and biblical scholar. He served as Moderator of the General Assembly of the Church of Scotland in 1971.

== Life ==
He was born into a working class family, the son of a railwayman, in Glasgow on 29 September 1909. He was educated at Strathbungo Higher Grade School and Albert Road Academy. He then studied Arts and Divinity at Glasgow University. During his university education, to help pay his ways, he worked at night as a proof-reader on the then Glasgow Herald.

== Ministry ==
Herron was ordained a minister within the Church of Scotland in 1934 and became assistant minister of Springburn. His first full charge was Linwood in 1936. In 1940 he translated to the neighbouring parish of Houston and Killellan. When, in the 50's, it was proposed to make Houston a new-town, Herron took up a Scots law class at Glasgow University to equip himself to resist the proposal. He completed the degree and obtained a practising solicitor’s certificate.

He was Clerk to the Presbytery of Paisley 1953 to 1959. In 1959, he demitted from the charge of Houston and Killellan to become the full-time Clerk to the Presbytery of Glasgow in 1959, retaining this role until 1981. During this time he spearheaded the campaign for "no" in the 1979 referendum on Scottish devolution.

From 1961 to 1992 (post-retiral) he was Editor of the Church of Scotland Yearbook.

His role as Moderator 1971/72 was succeeded by Very Rev Ronald Selby Wright. During his time as Moderator, he became one of the first to go and see the then Pope. He had been invited to an audience with Pope Paul VI. He was the first Moderator of the General Assembly since 1787 not to possess an honorary doctorate of divinity.

In the year after being Moderator, he became convenor of the General Administration committee of the General Assembly and the Business Committee. He had previously served on the Convener of the Department of Publicity and Publications.

== Family & Personal Life ==
In 1935 he married Joanna Fraser Neill (Queenie), who predeceased him. They had four daughters and a son, the latter who had also predeceased him. He retired in 1981 and died in Giffnock on 27 February 2003 aged 93.

== Publications ==
- Record Apart (1974)
- A Guide to the General Assembly of the Church of Scotland (1976)
- A Guide to Congregational Affairs (1978)
- A Guide to the Presbytery (1983)
- Historical Directory to Glasgow Presbytery (1984)
- Kirk by Divine Right (1985)
- A Guide to Ministerial Income (1987)
- The Law and Practice of the Kirk (1995)
- Kirk Lore (1999)
- A Guide to the Ministry

Herron helped to establish the Church of Scotland's own publishing house: the St Andrew Press in 1954.
