= Thomas Murchison =

Thomas Moffat Murchison (1907-1984) was a Church of Scotland minister and Scottish Gaelic scholar.

== Early life ==
He was born 27 July 1907, in Glasgow and brought up on the family croft in Skye. He was educated at Kylerhea Primary School, Portree High School and Trinity College, Glasgow.

== Career ==
In 1958 he was a Bard of An Comunn Gàidhealach.

He was Minister of Glenelg from 1932 to 1937; St Columba Copland Road Church Glasgow from 1937 to 1966; and of St Columba Summertown Church, Glasgow from then until 1972. He was Moderator of the General Assembly of the Church of Scotland from 1969 to 1970. He was the first Gaelic-speaking moderator since 1948 when Rev Dr Alexander Macdonald held the position. He expressed concerns about support for crofters and the importance of developing the Western parts of the Highlands.

He died on 9 January 1984.

== Personal life ==
Murchiston married Mary Black Morton Philp (1913-2010) in 1940. He had two daughters, Anne and Fiona, and a son, Andrew.
