= 2018–2023 United Kingdom higher education strikes =

Series of education strikes in UK universities

United Kingdom higher education strikes
- "The Four Fights"; Part of the 2021–present UK cost-of-living crisis and UK industrial disputes and strikes (2022–present)
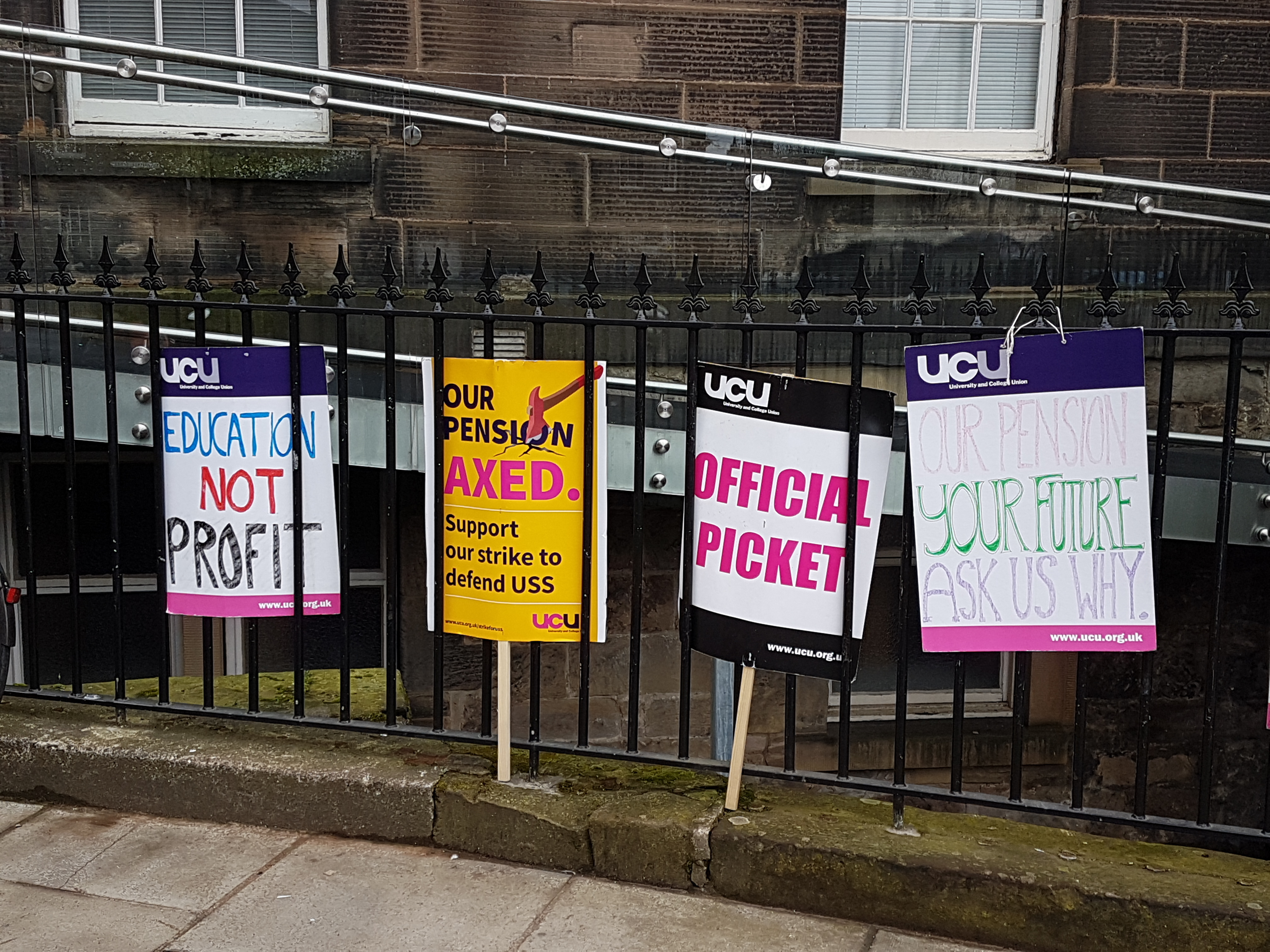
- Strike placards in 2018
- Date: 29 January 2018 – 6 November 2023
- Location: United Kingdom
- Goals: Opposition to USS reform; The Four Fights: Achieving pay equality; Reducing workload; Reversing casualisation; Improved pay
- Methods: Strike action, Picketing, Political demonstration, Marking and Assessment Boycott, Actions Short of A Strike (ASOS)
- Result: UCU victory on USS reform; more favourable terms offered and 2022 cuts reversed.; UCU ballot to extend action on the Four Fights dispute fails in November 2023.

Parties
University and College Union (UCU); Unison; Unite the Union	USS Pension; Universities UK; Universities and Colleges Employers Association

Lead figures
UCU: Jo Grady, General Secretary	UCEA: Raj Jethwa, CEO (2020-present); Prof. Mark E. Smith, Chair (2015-2022); George Boyne, Chair (2022-present); UUK: Prof. Julia Buckingham, President (2019-2021); Prof. Steve West, President (2021-2023)

From 2018 to 2023, the UK university sector faced an industrial dispute between staff, represented most often by the University and College Union (UCU), and their employers, represented by Universities UK (UUK) and the Universities and Colleges Employers Association (UCEA). The dispute was initially over proposed changes to the Universities Superannuation Scheme (USS), a pension scheme. The changes would have seen a significant drop in worker compensation, and in response the sector experienced industrial action on a scale not before seen. Pay equality, workload, casualisation, and pay levels (dubbed the "Four Fights") were added to the dispute in 2019. Action was curtailed by the onset of the COVID-19 pandemic in the United Kingdom, but resumed in 2021.

By March 2023 a resolution had been reached on the USS, which returned to 2017 terms in a victory for the UCU. The UCU was however not successful on The Four Fights, as a November 2023 ballot for extending action failed on turnout. Many universities faced mass redundancies in 2024 amid declining funding. Around a quarter of universities were planning to cut staff in 2025.

The dispute was the longest in UK higher-education history, involving 42,000 staff and affecting over one million students. The lost teaching hours, along with COVID related disruption, was the subject of a 2024 class action lawsuit which was resolved outside of court. It has been characterised as a "milestone" for "impending service sector strikes of the 21st century." It pre-dated but ran concurrently with a wave of industrial action nationwide in response to the cost of living crisis.

== Background to the strikes ==
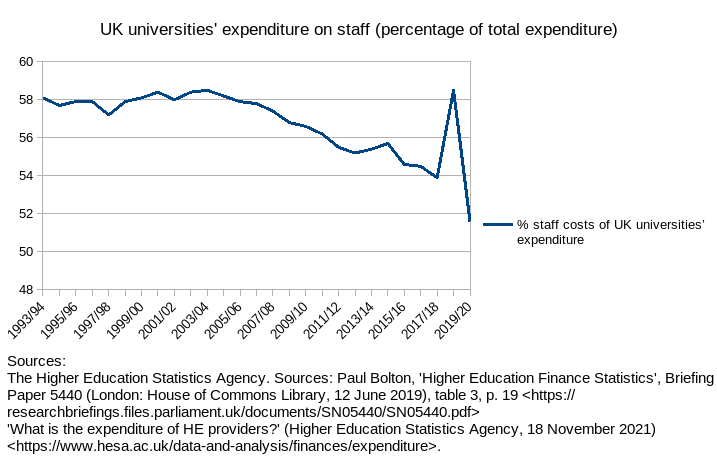
UK universities' expenditure on staff costs (percentage of total expenditure), 1993/94–2019/20, according to the Higher Education Statistics Agency The large fluctuation in 2018-20 reflects "an exceptional, non-cash expense adjustment to reflect the changes in provision for future pension deficit reductions".

UK university pay and student income, 2006–16, inflation-adjusted to 2017 prices. Over the period, total spending per student rises by around £2000; vice-chancellors' remuneration rises by £21873; professors' pay falls by £7544; and average pay across all academic staff falls by £4304.

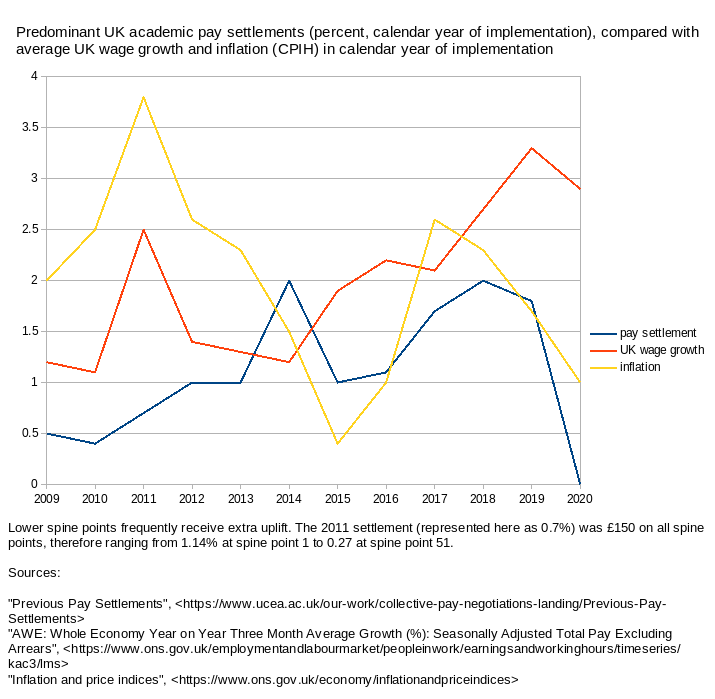
Predominant UK academic pay settlements (blue), compared with average UK wage growth (red) and inflation (yellow) in calendar year of implementation

As of 2018, the United Kingdom had 130 universities. Staff at 68 universities founded before 1992 were members of the USS pension scheme and were involved in disputes about that scheme. (Most academic staff at institutions which became universities after 1992 were members of the Teachers' Pension Scheme, which was unaffected by the USS dispute.) Staff at all universities were involved in disputes about pay and conditions of employment.

The strikes took place in the context of wider tensions over higher education and pension provision in the UK.

=== Pensions ===
==== The USS pension scheme ====
The Universities Superannuation Scheme was created in 1974 to provide sector-wide pensions for UK university staff (focusing on academic staff). Its terms changed little until 2011, when major reforms were implemented, followed by further changes in 2014–15. These left scheme members markedly worse off: one academic study concluded that the reduced wealth of post-2011 entrants was equivalent to an 11% drop in their total compensation or a 13% drop in their salaries.

By 2017, the USS scheme had over 400,000 members.

==== Wider UK pensions ====
- The UK Pensions Act 2004 had placed stringent requirements on private-sector pensions to ensure that their liabilities could be met even if all their member organisations collapsed at once—which in the context of USS would entail the whole University system going bust, an event deemed unlikely by many. Over 2006–17, the proportion of UK private-sector defined-benefit schemes open to new joiners declined from 43% to 14%. In the analysis of Mervyn King and John Kay, 'The 2004 Pensions Act is a prime, but by no means unique, example of well-intentioned but inept financial regulation. Over-prescriptive, it has led to the demise of the defined benefit schemes that it was designed to protect. If proposed changes to the USS are implemented, there will be no defined benefit schemes of any significant size outside the public sector open to new members.
- Similar or even more dramatic proposed pension cuts for universities' non-academic staff. For example, in January 2018, Southampton University began consultations on closing its defined-benefits pension scheme for non-academic staff, and in March 2018, Staffordshire University began consultations on moving support staff from the defined-benefit local government scheme to a local defined-contribution scheme.
- Worsening outlooks for pension provision across the UK, in the context of rising remuneration for fund managers and increasing integration of pension funds into speculative financial markets. For example, it was noted that pay for USS's chief executive rose from £484,000 in 2017 to £566,000 in 2018, while two staff members earned over £1m, and running costs stood at £125m per annum.

=== Pay and conditions ===
- Concern among university staff about falling real-terms pay for most staff. Moreover, the pay projections assumed in USS's 2017 valuation and used to argue for reducing pensions assumed an increase in general pay growth: rather than assuming pay would keep up with inflation (as measured by the consumer price index), USS assumed pay growth one percent above inflation (as measured, more generously, by the Retail Price Index). On 16 April 2018, staff were actually offered a payrise of 1.7%, below both CPI inflation (then 2.7%) and RPI (then 3.6%). Concerns about inflation, among both employers and employees, grew acute in 2022, as inflation in the United Kingdom spiked for the first time in over a decade, rapidly eroding the real value of pay, pensions, and student fee income.
- Growing numbers of academic staff were on precarious short-term or zero-hours contracts – in 2018–19, 34% of academic staff were employed on short-term contracts and 13% were paid by the hour. In March 2018, UCU argued on the basis of data from a freedom of information request that an average of 27% UK university teaching hours were delivered by such staff. The issue of casualisation became increasingly prominent in UCU members' understanding of the strikes as they developed. Similar concerns were being voiced across Europe, for example through the 2016 Bratislava Declaration and the 2021 German #IchBinHanna movement.
- Public concern about rising pay for University senior management, particularly Vice-chancellors.
- Similar concerns were reflected by strike action around the same time more widely in UK professional classes: junior doctors undertook their first strikes in the history of the National Health Service (England) in 2015–16, while barristers began strike action on 1 April 2018.

=== National UK higher education policy ===
- Debates about tuition fee levels and the mechanisms for paying them. In particular, on 19 February 2018, the UK Prime Minister Theresa May had announced an official review of UK higher education funding.
- The increasingly corporate and privatised character of higher education institutions. For example, universities, whose capital expenditure had traditionally been funded to a significant extent by government funding, were increasingly borrowing from private capital markets, making them concerned about their credit ratings, and with uncertain consequences for their finances and governance.
- The creation of the Office for Students on 1 January 2018, whose powers came into force 1 April 2018. For example, on 28 February 2018, the OFS said that "universities that fail to mitigate the impact of the strikes would open themselves up to regulatory intervention".

== 2018 USS pension negotiations, and associated strike action ==
=== Prior to industrial action ===
In July 2017, USS reported a technical deficit (i.e. a gap between the fund's assets and its liabilities) of £17.5 billion, reported as the largest such shortfall in the UK at that time. USS's deficit evaluation was based on suggestions that although the fund's assets had grown (reaching £60 billion, a one-fifth increase on the previous year), its liabilities had also grown (reaching £78 billion, a one-third increase over the previous year). Following negotiations regarding the calculation of the deficit, the USS Joint Negotiating Committee accepted a technical deficit of £6.1 billion in November 2017.

The key change proposed by UUK was to close USS's defined benefit scheme (possibly temporarily), replacing it with a defined contribution scheme.

Specifically, the USS Joint Negotiating Committee therefore made the following proposals, to be introduced after 1 April 2019:

- Closing of the defined benefits section of the scheme (though mentioning the possibility of reintroducing it), with all future benefits (apart from death in service and ill health retirement benefits) being transferred to the defined contribution scheme.
- Contributions would remain 8% for members and 18% for employers (of which 13.25% contributes directly to pensions, the rest being used for management and running costs, etc.).
- Members would be enabled to pay only 4% while still receiving the usual employer contribution, while the option of paying an extra 1%, matched by the employer, would be removed.
- Members' 8% (or 4%) would include a contribution to partly finance death in service and ill health retirement benefits.

The closure of defined benefits was presented as a red line by UCU, which argued in favour of finding ways to sustain defined benefits, or to introduce a collective defined contribution scheme (the primary legislation for which was introduced in the UK in 2015, but which had not as of March 2018 been advanced to secondary legislation).

==== Arguments for the changes ====
USS argued that market conditions had simply proven less favourable than previous valuations had assumed, with the chief executive, Bill Galvin, arguing that 'the unavoidable fact is that market conditions have changed since 2014. Real interest rates have fallen since 2014, relative to inflation, and asset prices have soared ... We are now having to pay more – to get less in return – than we expected in the past'. Moreover, USS emphasised that its room for manoeuvre was constrained by the Pensions Regulator.

In theory, the deficit could have been resolved through higher contribution rates. However, UUK argued that defined benefit schemes were becoming prohibitively expensive. They said they had a legal duty to put in place a credible plan to reduce the deficit by the summer of 2018. Otherwise, pension contributions from employers and staff would have to sharply increase, potentially resulting in redundancies and cuts to other areas of teaching, research and student support. UUK stated the defined contributions proposal would compare well with private-sector competitors, with employer contributions double the private sector average.

USS had a legal responsibility to satisfy the UK pensions regulator that the scheme was sound, and the regulator was requiring change.

==== Arguments against the changes ====
UCU stated that UUK's proposal would "leave a typical lecturer almost £10,000 a year worse off in retirement than under the current set-up", with younger staff the worst affected, with some losing up to half their anticipated pensions.

Critics of the changes offered the following main arguments against implementing the changes to the scheme promoted by UUK.

- UUK's assessment of the health of the higher education sector after a 2015/16 report by the Higher Education Funding Council for England (HEFCE) found the sector was financially sound. Independent analyses undertaken by University of Warwick economist Dennis Leech and UCL academic Sean Wallis argued that UUK used a "flawed valuation model".
- The proposed USS changes were shaped by the demand of the UK pensions regulator that USS should be made less risky to employers than USS's actuaries had wished. It was argued, however, that in view of the exceptional economic circumstances associated with the Bank of England's quantitative easing from 2009, the regulator was placing unrealistic expectations on UK pensions nationally.
- Concern also grew, on the basis of research by Michael Otsuka from the London School of Economics, that UUK's negotiating position was disproportionately influenced by the views of Oxford and Cambridge Universities, whose constituent colleges made separate submissions to consultations.
- Current employees were annually paying £2.1bn into the USS fund, while it was annually paying out £1.8bn to pensioners. To cover the current annual cost of pensions from investment returns, the fund required a net annual return of 3%. One of the assumptions used in the July 2017 valuation was that the fund would stop accepting contributions – the sort of situation that would normally arise if the companies in a pension scheme went bust, which was an unlikely real-world situation for the UK higher education sector. USS's analyses showed that, assuming the most likely circumstances rather than the most challenging circumstances (technically referred to as the "best estimate"), the pension scheme was sustainable in the long-term. In contrast to technical deficits based on stringently conservative assumptions, this more probable valuation showed the fund in credit by £8.3 billion.
- At the inception of USS, employer contributions were 16% of salary, rising to 18.55% in 1983. However, from January 1997 to September 2009 they were decreased to 14% (before rising to 16% from October 2009 to 2016 and 18% thereafter). It was suggested that staff were bearing the consequences of an earlier lack of investment by employers.

=== UCU ballots for industrial action (29 January 2018) ===
On 29 January, UCU announced that 88% of UCU members had voted to back strike action and 93% backed action short of a strike. The turnout was 58%, meeting the 50% minimum set by the Trade Union Act 2016.

Shortly after, on 13 February, the trade union UNISON, many of whose members in the Higher Education sector were also USS members, began a consultative ballot on striking alongside UCU. On 20 February, UNISON wrote to vice-chancellors in support of UCU's position.

=== Strike action commences (23 February 2018) and new negotiations follow ===
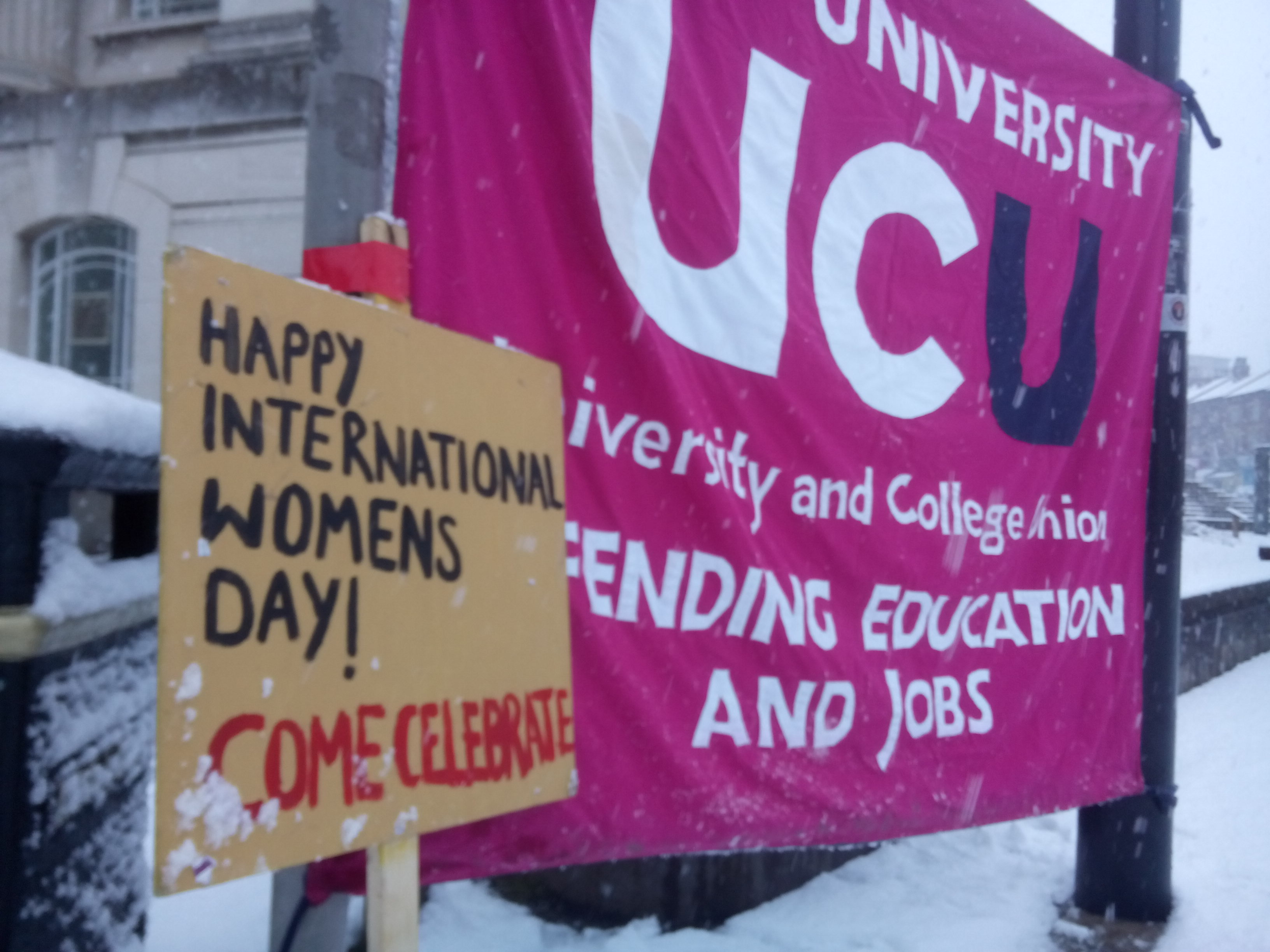
International Women's Day and Leeds UCU signs, 2018

Strikes commenced on 23 February, coinciding with an exceptional level of snow and ice from the 2018 British Isles cold wave which added further disruption to education. With the commencement of strikes, UUK agreed to meet UCU for further negotiations on 27 February. Leaked emails suggested they would not negotiate on UCU's key issue, retaining defined benefits. The meeting led to an agreement to undergo conciliation through Acas, the UK's national industrial dispute conciliation body. UCU tabled and published a set of proposals which it argued was consistent with the majority of UUK members' positions in USS's earlier consultation, but strikes were not called off.

A spokesperson for Universities UK said: "Both sides are currently engaged in serious and constructive talks at Acas. We are committed to seeking a viable, affordable and mutually acceptable solution to the current challenges facing USS pensions."

=== UCU's proposal (27 February 2018) ===
UCU tabled an alternative proposal at the first round of talks with UUK which UCU stated would involve universities accepting some increased risk and small increased contributions from employers and scheme members. UUK's response was that they would need time to cost the union's proposal which it feared would require "very substantial increases in contributions". However, some vice-chancellors voiced support for UCU's plan.

UCU's proposal, along with suggestions for longer-term strategies, was:

- Universities should accept a slightly riskier but probably more lucrative investment strategy, leading to a deficit of £5.1 billion rather than £6.1 billion, a level accepted by the majority of institutions when it was proposed by USS in September 2017.
- Retaining defined benefits on salaries up to £55,550.
- Reducing the annual accrual rate from 1/75 to 1/80.
- Increasing contributions by 2.7% for employers and 1.4% for members (i.e. 4.1% split 65/35 between employers and employees).

The parties held inconclusive talks on 5 March, scheduling the next talks for 7 March. However, a bizarre Twitter spasm from UUK on the night of 5 March insisted that the group was available for talks on 6 March, and this led to talks at noon on 6 March. Talks continued on 7 March, inconclusively. On 8 March, UCU's Higher Education Committee agreed that it would call further strikes if necessary after the Easter vacation, between April and June.

=== Joint UUK and UCU proposal (12 March 2018) ===
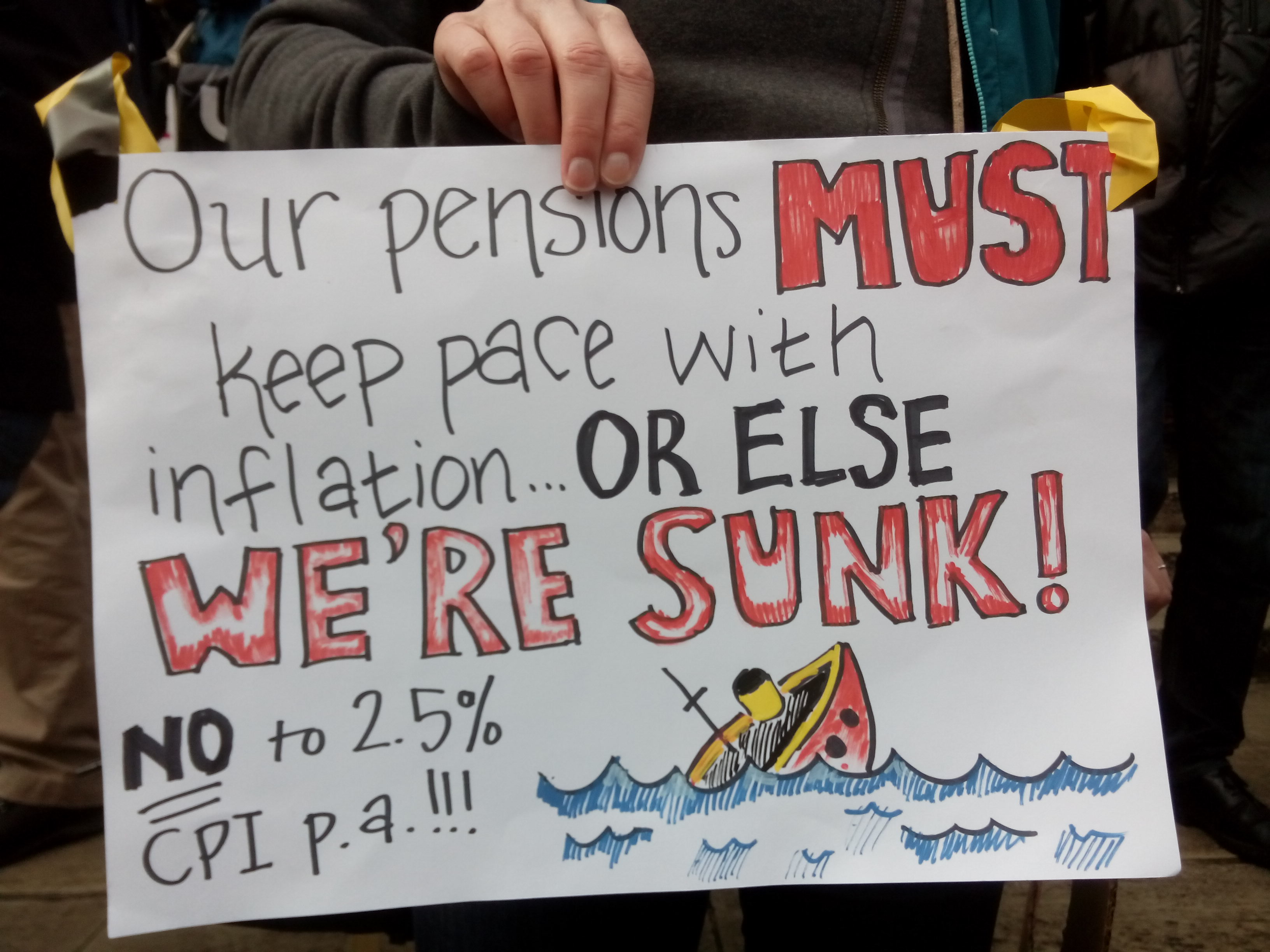
Placard from 13 March 2018 UCU protest, Leeds.

On the evening of Monday 12 March UCU and UUK issued a joint agreement, arrived at through ACAS, to be put to their respective members.

The agreement was specifically for a three-year "transitional benefit arrangement" lasting from 1 April 2019, maintaining defined benefits up to a salary threshold of £42,000, reducing the accrual rate to 1/85, but raising contributions to 19.3% of salaries for employers and 8.7% for members. The next valuation was to be informed by an "independent expert group", 'aiming to promote greater transparency and understanding' of the methodologies, assumptions, and viability of the scheme. Indexation and revaluation was to be measured using CPI and capped at up to 2.5% p.a. (meaning that if inflation, measured by CPI, rose above 2.5%, the pension would lose value in real terms). UCU was to suspend industrial action and "encourage" branches to reschedule any classes disrupted by the strike. The agreement stated that "there is commitment between both sides to engage in meaningful discussions as soon as possible to explore risk sharing alternatives for the future from 2020, in particular Collective Defined Contributions".

Vice-chancellors were to inform UUK whether they would back this deal by the end of day on Wednesday 14 March while UCU representatives consulted with their members on whether to reject the deal or not the next day.

=== Acas agreement withdrawn by UCU (13 March 2018) ===
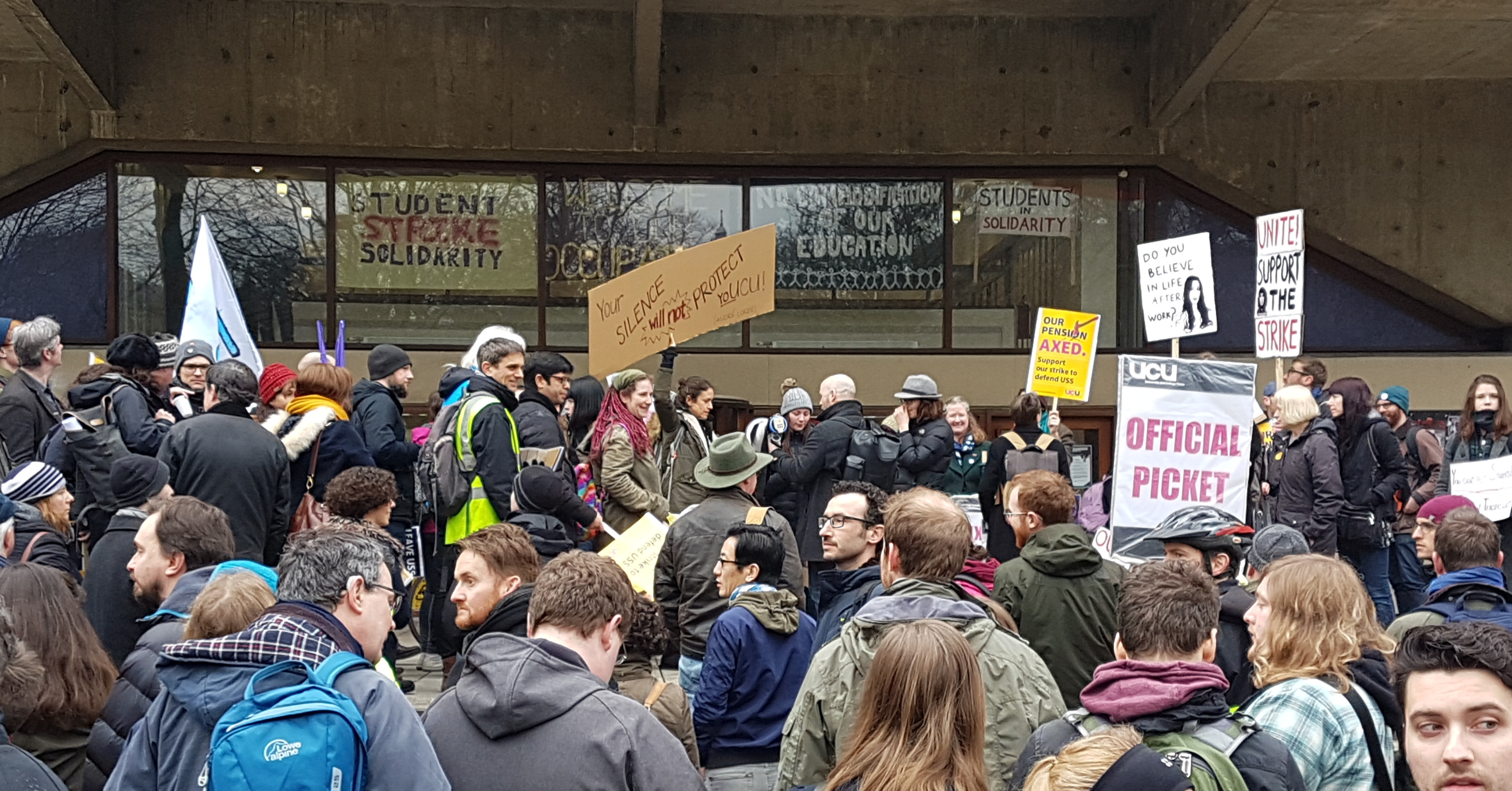
UCU meeting at the University of Edinburgh

Local branch meetings were held on Tuesday 13 March to consider the ACAS agreement. These meetings informed a meeting of elected and branch representatives the same day. This agreement was rejected by UCU's membership on the grounds that it failed to address members' concerns. Many UCU members used the Twitter hashtag #NoCapitulation to express their disapproval of the agreement, helping to co-ordinate a strong response to the proposals.

UCU general secretary Sally Hunt said that preparations for strikes during the exam period would be made, while urgently seeking further talks.

A UUK spokesperson said:

It is hugely disappointing that students' education will be further disrupted through continued strike action. We have engaged extensively with UCU negotiators to find a mutually acceptable way forward.

In some places, the decision was followed the next day by rallies.

=== Developments 14–23 March 2018 ===
As of 14 March, UUK's consultation with its members remained ongoing.

A statutory 64-day consultation by USS on pension changes had been due to commence on 19 March, but as of 15 March, USS were declaring an unspecified delay to the commencement of consultations.

On 16 March, UCU called on members employed as external examiners to resign until the dispute was resolved. By 23 March over 600 resignations had occurred.

On 18 March, UUK announced that it would convene an "independent panel", featuring an independent chair and involving academics and pension professionals, to "consider issues of methodology, assumptions and monitoring, aiming to promote greater transparency and understanding of the USS valuation". The panel would invite UCU "to play a full role in providing evidence to the panel" and would also liaise with USS and the pensions regulator. UCU's response was that "UCU will of course look at any proposals UUK makes but our members have made it quite clear that what is needed is a much improved offer".

On 22 March, UCU sanctioned fourteen further strike days to fall in the April to June 2018 exam period should the talks fail to come to a resolution.

On 23 March, UNISON announced that its consultative ballot of its USS members had returned 91% support for industrial action, and that it would begin a formal ballot for strike action in April.

=== UUK makes a new offer (23 March 2018) ===
On 23 March, UCU announced a new offer from UUK. This proposed the creation of a formal "Joint Expert Panel" to reconsider how valuations should be undertaken, leaving open the possibility of maintaining the status quo not only for the statutory period up to April 2019, but possibly beyond. The panel would

take into account the unique nature of the HE sector, inter-generational fairness and equality considerations, the need to strike a fair balance between ensuring stability and risk. Recognising that staff highly value Defined Benefit provision, the work of the group will reflect the clear wish of staff to have a guaranteed pension comparable with current provision whilst meeting the affordability challenges for all parties, within the current regulatory framework.

The Financial Times noted that this would be "a far more comprehensive review of the current structure and valuation of the Universities Superannuation Scheme" than previously considered, but also noted that "the new agreement avoids any mention of increases in contributions by either employers or employees to plug the hole in the scheme". UCU was due to consult members' representatives at a formal meeting on 28 March.

Meanwhile, on 26 March, the UK's Joint Negotiating Committee for Higher Education Staff began its round of negotiations for pay in the sector for 2018/19, with unions demanding a large pay uplift.

=== New strike dates announced as UCU members balloted on proposal (28 March 2018) ===
UCU announced that members would be electronically balloted on the new offer in April to decide on the proposal for the Joint Expert Panel. UUK pledged to maintain the current contributions and retirement benefits until at least April 2019 while the review by the panel of experts took place.

At the same time, UCU gave formal notice of a five-day strike action, aimed at disrupting the exams and assessments period, at some universities for 16 to 20 April 2018, potentially to be called off if there was progress in the negotiations. 13 universities including Manchester, Cardiff, Oxford, St Andrews, Leeds and Southampton would be affected by this next round of strikes with the prospect of industrial action at the other 52 universities to take place later in April and continuing into July if no agreement was reached. However, staff would not take part in additional strike action if UCU members vote to accept the UUK proposal.

As of 28 March, nearly 700 external examiners had recorded their resignations in a UCU document. The Guardian reported that "students at the end of their courses could find themselves unable to graduate if crucial exams cannot be invigilated, marked or assessed" as a worst-case scenario.

Debate followed among UCU members as to whether to accept the proposals or not. As of 4 April, some branches had decided to recommend that their members reject the proposals as they stood, and prominent discontent with the proposals continued to be registered in the run-up to the ballot closing.

=== UCU accepts UUK proposal (13 April 2018) and Joint Expert Panel is formed ===
The result of the ballot was the UCU members accepted UUK proposal. Industrial action was suspended and the impending strikes of 16 April were called off.

Total balloted	53,415
Total votes cast	33,973
Total number valid votes	33,913
Turnout	63.5%
Yes to accept the UUK offer	21,683 (64%)
No to reject the UUK offer	12,230 (36%)

On 18 April, UCU confirmed that it was ending its call for external examiners to stand down. Commentary suggested that scrutiny of the pension negotiations by the union membership was nonetheless ongoing.

On 18 May, UUK and UCU announced that the Joint Expert Panel would be chaired by Joanne Segars. On 21 May UCU announced three nominations to the panel. Other members were later determined as Ronnie Bowie, Sally Bridgeland, and Chris Curry (appointed by UUK) and Catherine Donnelly, Saul Jacka, and Deborah Mabbett (appointed by UCU). The Joint Expert Panel was scheduled to report in September.

On 1–3 June, a tumultuous UCU congress included calls for the general secretary, Sally Hunt, to resign over what was perceived to be undemocratic practice within the Union's prosecution of the dispute. Much of the congress's proceedings had to be aborted, and a new congress was proposed for the future. (On 18 October a recalled congress saw the withdrawal of motions to call for resignation, but a motion of censure was passed complaining at a lack of transparency and accountability in Hunt's representation of UCU members during the dispute.)

=== USS plans contribution increases (25 July 2018) ===
While the Joint Expert Panel deliberated, USS announced that, given that the legal deadline for addressing the fund's deficit had passed, it would, in accordance with statutory procedure, act already to raise both staff and employer contributions, following a statutory consultation period, to maintain the scheme's benefits. The proposed rises (as a percentage of salary) were to be phased in over a year:

	Staff contributions	Employer contributions
status quo	8%	18%
April 2019	8.8%	19.5%
October 2019	10.4%	22.5%
April 2020	11.7%	24.9%

These plans were announced against a backdrop of USS's annual report calculations of the deficit falling, due to changing assumptions about factors such as returns on corporate bonds and mortality. On different measures, the 2018 annual report showed a 2014 deficit of 12.6bn falling to a 2018 deficit of 12.1bn; or a £17.5bn deficit falling to £8.4 billion deficit. Though this plan was criticised by UCU and UUK, as of 22 November 2018, USS continued to plan to implement it.

=== Joint Expert Panel releases first report (13 September 2018) ===
On 13 September, the Joint Expert Panel that had been convened to re-examine the valuation of the USS scheme issued its first report. The Panel's press release recommended a number of adjustments to the methodology and data used in the 2017 valuation of the USS scheme, and stated that "it is the Panel's belief, based on independent actuarial analysis, that the full implementation of these adjustments could mean total required contributions estimated at 29.2% to fund current benefits [...] This compares to the current rate of 26% (18% of salary paid by employers, 8% by employees) and the rate of 36.6% from April 2020 which is proposed by USS, based on the valuation as it stands". It was suggested that this proposal might entail raising employees' contributions to 9.1% of salary, and employers' by 2.1%, taking their contribution to 20.1%.

On 15 October Sam Marsh, of the University of Sheffield, reported in detail on his own analysis of data obtained from USS after a long period of requesting the information. He found that the methodologies by which USS's 'test 1' measures the pension scheme's viability were flawed, and that by maintaining previous investment strategies, USS would have the surplus it would require to meet its future liabilities. UUK asked the USS trustee to investigate Marsh's arguments. Marsh's commentary had also attracted prominent support from Michael Otsuka. USS defended its position the next day, accepting that Marsh's reanalysis was 'not wrong in isolation', but arguing that de-risking was necessary anyway. In response, UCU commissioned an independent report by First Actuarial which on 16 November 2018 supported Marsh's arguments and levelled a number of criticisms at USS's valuations and reasoning.

On 8 November, UUK reported on a consultation of its members, which found them, like UCU, to support the Joint Expert Panel's recommendations. The news was welcomed by UCU. This suggested that a consensus position between these parties had been more or less achieved, meaning that the main faultline in the dispute now ran between USS on the one side, and UCU and UUK on the other.

=== USS declares 2017 valuation complete but agrees to a new 2018 valuation (22 November 2018) ===
On 22 November, USS declared that 'as member and employer representatives on the Joint Negotiating Committee could not agree on an alternative outcome to the 2017 valuation', it would maintain the defined benefits scheme but implement contribution increases using the Scheme's default rules for cost-sharing between members and employers, as published on 25 July (starting with a small increase in contributions in April 2019). The 2017 valuation was eventually signed off on 29 January 2019.

However, USS agreed to undertake a new valuation of the fund as it stood at 31 March 2018, which the Joint Expert Panel had suggested would indicate a far smaller deficit. It was thought that this new valuation might forestall further requirements for contribution increases after April 2019.

=== Consultation on 2018 USS valuation closes (28 February 2019) ===
On 2 January 2019, USS began a consultation with UUK on its 2018 valuation, which closed 28 February. USS proposed that it should be possible to increase overall contributions from 26% of salary (the contribution level that obtained from April 2016 to April 2019) to 29.7% of salary, rather than the higher increases planned in response to the 2017 valuation—but only if scheme members agreed to a system of 'trigger contributions' (additional contributions that would be triggered if short-term measures of deficit exceeded a certain level). UUK members, however, expressed scepticism at the necessity and appropriateness of this arrangement. In response, on 9 May 2019, USS proposed three options 'for finalising the 2018 valuation', retaining the scheme's previous benefits, and requiring lower contributions than the arrangement that the scheme had defaulted to in the absence of an agreement, but requiring much higher contributions than the proposals put forward by the JEP:

1. A fixed total contribution rate of 33.7% of salary.
2. A standard total contribution rate of 29.7% but with 'sufficiently strong contingent contribution arrangements' enabling higher contributions in certain circumstances.
3. A fixed total contribution rate of 30.7%, 'subject to a 2020 valuation'.

Meanwhile, on 15 March the Council of Trinity College, Cambridge voted to withdraw the college unilaterally from USS as of 31 May 2019, in a move that came to be called Trexit. By October 2019, the college had replaced the USS scheme with a defined benefits scheme to avoid the college bearing any responsibility for other pensions in the UK higher education system in the event of foreclosures in the sector. The move sparked protests, resignations, and a boycott.

On 21 May 2019, it was revealed that Jane Hutton, in her capacity as a non-executive director on the USS board of trustees, had in March 2018 complained to the Pensions Regulator, alleging that her efforts in 2017 to check whether the USS deficit had been miscalculated had been frustrated by delays and obstructions to providing her with data to which she needed access to fulfil her fiduciary duties. As of May 2019, the Pensions Regulator and Financial Reporting Council were investigating the allegations. On 14 June 2019, as the investigation continued, the Regulator rebuked USS for claiming that aspects of USS policy were mandated by the Regulator when in fact they were not. On 11 October 2019, it was reported that Hutton had been dismissed as a director of USS on the grounds that, according to an independent investigation, "she had breached a number of her director's duties owed under company law and contract". USS said that the dismissal was independent of Hutton's whistleblowing and the ongoing investigation; Hutton said she did not view the decision as valid and was considering further action.

On 22 August 2019, the Joint Negotiating Committee, representing UCU and UUK, met to determine the position that they would put to the USS trustees. The independent chair, Andrew Cubie, used his deciding vote to support UUK's preferred plan. In this scheme, total contributions per member would be 30.7% of salary, with 9.6% being paid by the employee and 21.1% by the employer. A further valuation would follow in 2020 and in the absence of an alternative agreement, the contribution rate would rise to 34.7% in October 2021 with members paying 11% and employers 23.7%. UCU argued that employees' contributions should not rise above 8%, and that the Joint Expert Panel had suggested alternative paths to achieving this that had been agreeable to both UCU and UUK. UUK offered to limit staff contributions to 9.1% instead of 9.6% if UCU would agree to hold no strikes on pensions for two years, an offer which UCU rejected. The 21.1%:9.6% contribution rates were ratified on 12 September by the USS trustee board.

== Responses to the 2018 pension strikes ==
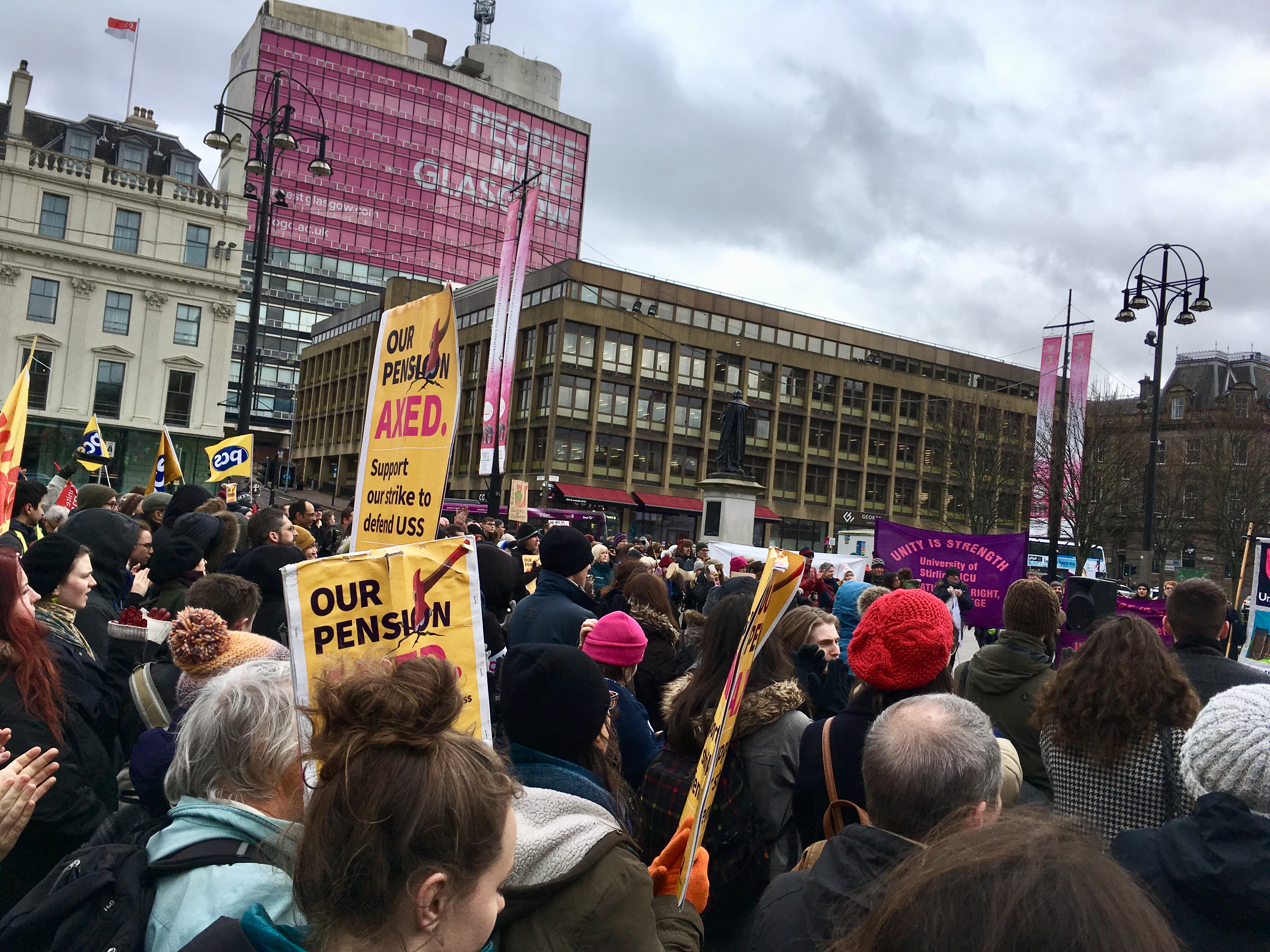
Crowds gather at a UCU strike rally in George Square, Glasgow.

=== Changes in UK law ===
The strike brought to the attention of unions and the UK government a potential ambiguity in UK legislation: migrant workers on Tier 2 and 5 visas have an annual 20-day limit on unpaid absence from work. As some universities had seen local strike action during 2017–18 in addition to the 14 days of national strike action, fears arose that staff members who were on strike for more than 20 days in a year might have their visas revoked, and that this might in turn impinge on their legal rights to take industrial action. On 12 July, the home secretary Sajid Javid declared that it was "not the government's policy to prevent migrant workers from engaging in legal strike action" and that he would introduce changes to the rules and guidelines on immigration to be explicit that strike action did not count as "unpaid absence".

=== Staff ===
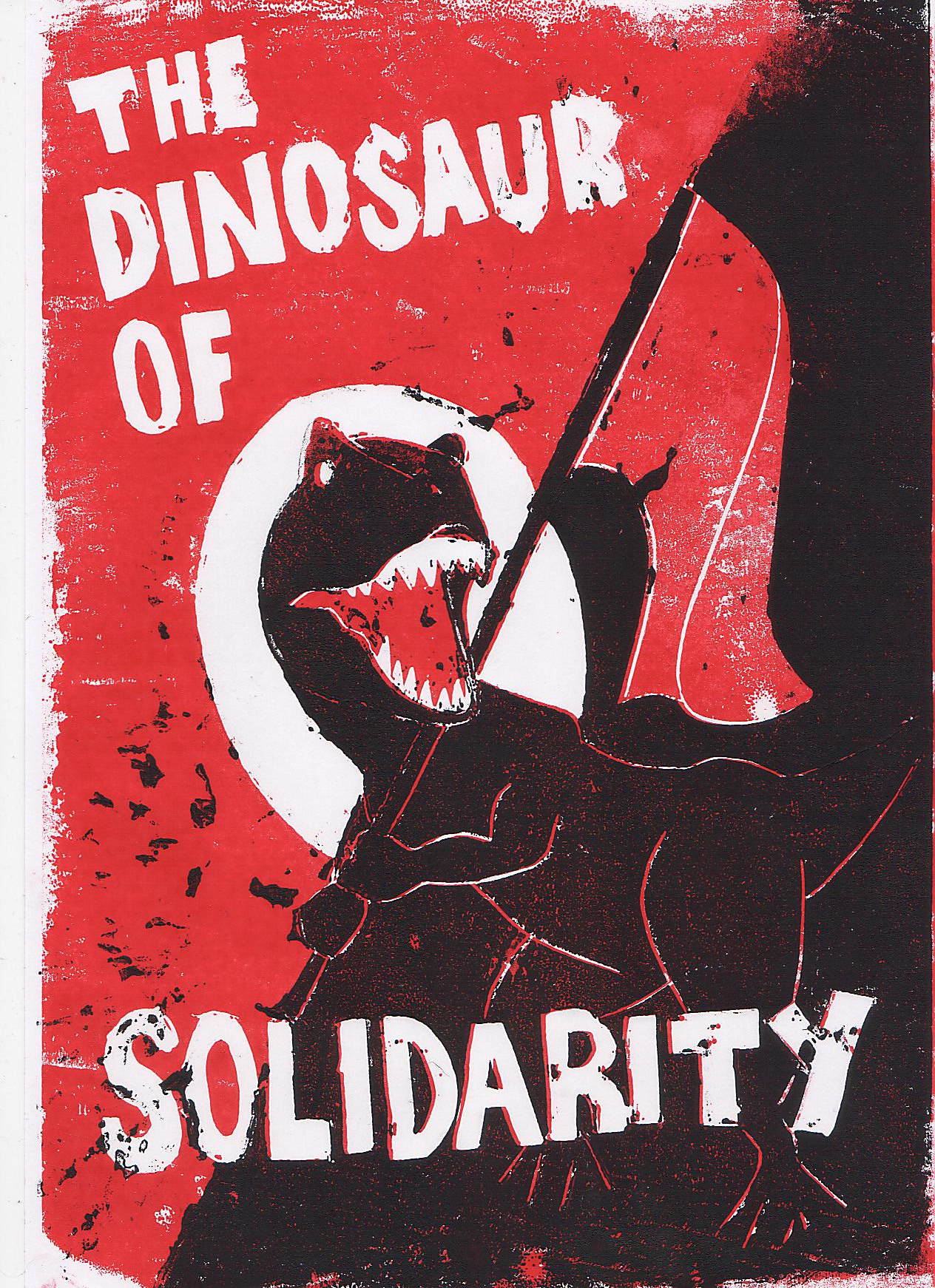
Dinosaur of Solidarity lino print, alluding to the presence of a dinosaur on Southampton UCU's picket lines.

In the ballot for the strike, UCU achieved an unusually high turnout and strong support for industrial action, and membership grew by about 15,000 between the beginning of 2018 and 12 April.

Staff organised "teach-outs" off campus at "every university with a substantial picket line"; these featured education sessions which tended to be left-wing or critical of recent changes in UK higher education, apparently led by the University of Leeds, whose UCU branch had tested the model during a local dispute in autumn 2017. Some pickets also featured staff singing rewrites of popular songs, among them Leeds University UCU's Strike Up Your Life (based on the Spice Girls' hit Spice Up Your Life) or dance routines, prominently including Cambridge University UCU's performance to Public Enemy's Fight the Power. A number of branches saw the production of zines; for example, geographers at the University of Nottingham produced a 'strike zine'. A Cambridge researcher working in the UK under a visa made an art installation reflecting their precarious situation. Meanwhile, Southampton University UCU's 'Dinosaur of Solidarity', a person in a dinosaur costume, became a minor social-media sensation.

As the strikes commenced, academics at Oxford and Cambridge began using those universities' democratic structures to change the universities' position on pension reform. Oxford staff's attempts to use the university's supreme governing body, Congregation, to effect a change of policy failed due to procedural problems on 5 March, but the next day Oxford's vice-chancellor Louise Richardson declared that the university would nonetheless heed the wishes of staff to "reverse its response to the UUK survey".

As the strikes developed, university staff increasingly called into question the governance structures of UUK, individual universities, and USS, along with the marketisation of the UK higher education sector and its increasingly precarious workforce. By 13 April, over 12,000 people had signed a petition calling for UUK to be made subject to the Freedom of Information Act 2000.

Staff also made extensive use of social media (see below).

=== Universities ===
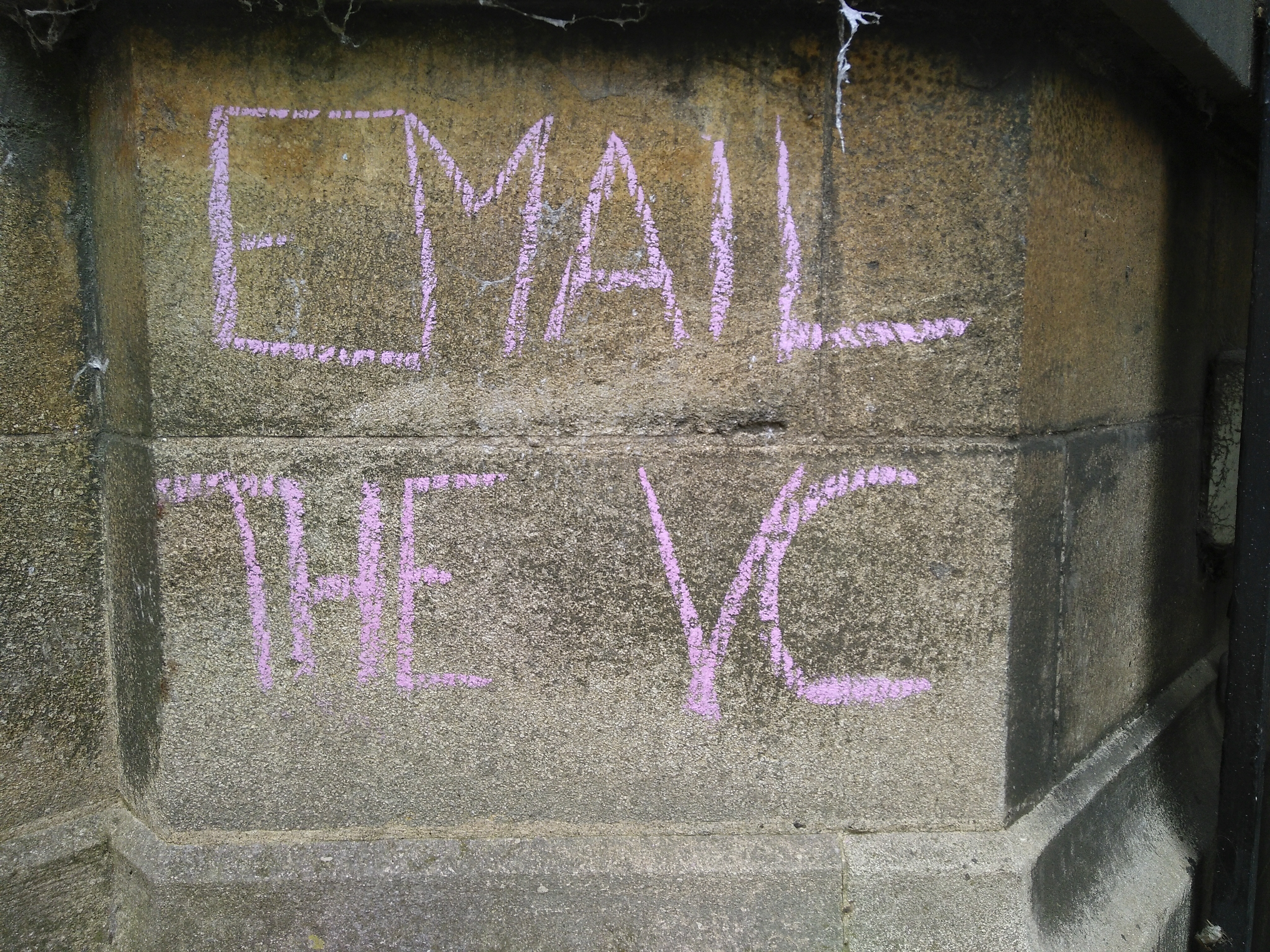
Chalk graffiti reading "email the VC", at the Downing Street entrance to the Sedgwick Site, Cambridge University, during the spring 2020 strikes.

Universities were represented in the dispute by UUK.

However, some vice-chancellors expressed support for UCU's position before the strike. Anthony Forster, vice-chancellor at the University of Essex, described a staff consultation process that led Essex to support retaining defined benefits via increased pension contributions. The University of Warwick's Stuart Croft publicly stated that "I am sure that I am not alone in being mystified at this [proposed] change", and argued, in line with the position of the Liberal Democrats, that the UK government should underwrite USS pensions.

After the strike began, other vice chancellors voiced concern about UUK's position, and by the second day of strike action, 18 were being reported as calling for renewed negotiations, or as supporting UCU's position. Some joined staff on picket lines, among them Anton Muscatelli (Glasgow), Keith Burnett (Sheffield) and Robert Allison (Loughborough). In a letter to The Times of 16 March, the vice-chancellor of Cambridge University, Stephen Toope, expressed sympathy with the concerns of staff and students about not only pensions, but also marketisation of UK universities, and held a wide-ranging public meeting with around 550 staff and students in Great St Mary's Church, scheduling a further such meeting for 26 April.

Some universities decided to cushion the financial impact of strike action on their staff by deducting pay for the days not worked over several months. These included Glasgow, Leicester, Cardiff, Cambridge, and York.

Video recording of lectures had become widespread in UK universities by 2016, and some universities sought to use lectures recorded in previous years to substitute for teaching missed during the strikes. This prompted renewed debates about what rights universities should claim in the intellectual output of their staff, which remained ongoing into 2021.

==== Threatened pay deductions for not rescheduling teaching ====
Conversely, many universities demanded that staff reschedule teaching that had not been delivered during the strike, noting their right to deduct pay for partial performance if staff did not. However, a smaller number appeared to be committed to implementing deductions. Examples which attracted media attention included:

University	Threatened deduction
University of St Andrews	100%
University of Sheffield	25%
University of Kent	50% per breach of contract
University of Leeds	25%
Keele University	20%

In Sheffield's case, pay deduction of 25% for partial performance, rising to 100% after five days, was initially threatened, provoking alumni to threaten to withdraw donations. The university then explained that it would not implement deductions for partial performance. Similar developments occurred at St Andrews, with the Principal, Sally Mapstone, writing that "having considered all matters in the round, I believe that our current policy to deduct pay at 100% for failure to reschedule classes cancelled due to strike action is inconsistent with this University's values and the store we place on our shared sense of community". At Leeds, a number of external examiners resigned in protest at the university's plans, ongoing as of 10 March, to deduct pay for partial performance, while Alice Goodman, widow of the university's noted professor Geoffrey Hill, addressed an open letter to the university's vice chancellor asking the university to reconsider its stance.

=== Students ===
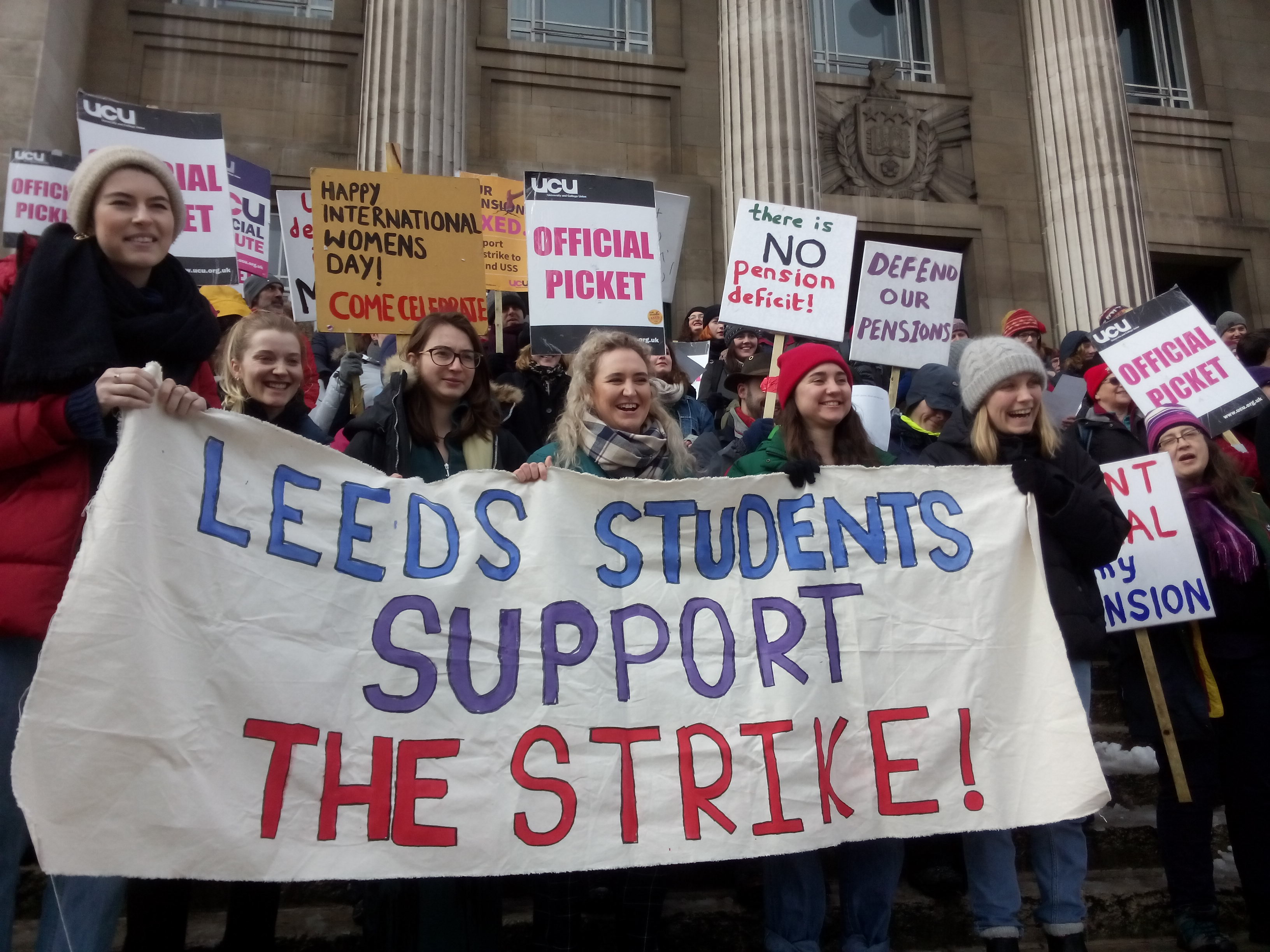
Leeds University students supporting the 2018 USS Pension Strikes on International Women's Day

==== Polls ====
A YouGov poll of 738 undergraduate students conducted for UCU between 13 and 20 February 2018 found that nationally, 61% of students said they supported the strikes, with 19% opposed and the remainder unsure. At striking institutions, support was 66%, with 18% opposed. In February 2018, a poll of 1,500 students for Times Higher Education magazine found over half (51.8%) would support their lecturer in a walk-out and just under a third (29.3%) would not. Support for the national strike was evenly balanced, with 38.4% in favour and 38.4% against.

By 8 March, extensive student support for the strikes was still being reported, observing that students were joining with staff in solidarity against the marketisation of UK higher education.

==== Occupations and other activism ====
On the first day of the strikes the UUK head office in London was occupied by students. Students undertook occupations of university buildings in support of the strike at various institutions, including University College London (26 February), the University of Liverpool (28 February) and the University of Bristol (5 March), along with students at Leicester, Bath, Exeter, Southampton, Sussex, and Reading. A fresh wave of occupations began on 12 March, following the publication of the first ACAS-brokered joint agreement between UCU and UUK, which UCU members rejected. Universities with occupations during that week included Reading, Cambridge (in the Old Schools), Dundee, York (in Heslington Hall), Sheffield (in the Arts Tower), Stirling, Aberdeen, Surrey, Sussex, Glasgow, and, Queen Mary University of London (in the Octagon).

The purpose of the occupations extended into other issues: on 19 March, University of London students occupied Senate House in support of a strike called for 25–26 April by outsourced worked including cleaners, porters and receptionists. At one point during the occupation, students were locked into a room by staff members of the university.

In the wake of the February–March strikes, the students' union at SOAS called on its members to refuse to submit work with deadlines before 23 March, arguing that deadlines so soon after the end of the strikes would negatively affect students' work.

==== Compensation ====
Students, who in England had since 2012 paid fees covering most of the cost of their education, responded by demanding compensation from their universities, explicitly in support of the striking staff: by 20 February 2018, 70,000 had signed letters and petitions of this kind, rising to around 126,000 by 5 March.

On 4 March 2018, it was reported that King's College London had become the first university to offer to use money not spent on striking staff's salaries to compensate students. Robert Liow, a third-year law student at the university, told the BBC that if universities did not refund students part of their fees, they would be profiting from the dispute, as they would gain the money not paid to striking university staff:

I don't want a consumerist education service. I believe education is a public good and not a service to be sold. But if we are going to be treated as consumers we are going to ask for our money back.

On 23 March 2018, it was reported that the international disputes lawyers Asserson had begun co-ordinating a no-win no-fee suit for compensation for students affected by the strikes, inviting students to sign up to participate online. On 24 April 2018, it was announced that over 1,000 students had signed up: enough to apply for a group litigation order. By 17 June, over 5,000 had joined. Asserson estimated that one million students had been affected by the strike, with 575,000 teaching hours lost. They suggested that universities might be liable for £20m compensation.

By May 2019, the Office of the Independent Adjudicator for Higher Education (designated under the Higher Education Act 2004 to run the higher education student complaints scheme within England and Wales) has issued a number of adjudications in response to student complaints, asking universities to offer partial refunds of fees.

Several organizations have emerged to assist students in claiming compensation due to disruptions caused by the strikes. One such platform is Student-Claims, which provides a structured process for students to pursue university strike compensation claims. Their efforts aim to streamline the process and ensure students receive the compensation they are entitled to amid the educational disruptions. Students also have the option to pursue claims independently if they prefer to manage the process on their own.

==== In media ====
On 25 November 2019, Joshua Curiel, a student at the University of Kent, wrote an article for The Guardian encouraging fellow students to support their lectures. Curiel argued that "This strike will have a greater impact if universities see that the lecturers have the full support of their students and understand that changes must be made. We have a part to play in these strikes, to keep the pressure up to ensure fairer working conditions."

=== Politicians ===
On 29 November 2017, Carol Monaghan (Scottish National Party) tabled an early day motion in the House of Commons entitled "Defending Academic Pensions", noting "with concern the proposal by Universities UK to close the defined benefit portion of the Universities Superannuation Scheme (USS) to all future service". The motion was sponsored by Caroline Lucas (Green Party), Martyn Day and Pete Wishart (SNP), and Jim Cunningham, and Mary Glindon (Labour). As of 19 March, it had been signed by 133 MPs.

During the first week of industrial action, UCU's stance was explicitly supported by the Labour and Green Parties. The Liberal Democrats argued that the government should underwrite the USS pension scheme, easing its assessment of risk. The Conservative universities minister Sam Gyimah encouraged the parties to negotiate, and encouraged universities to compensate students for missed education.

The Chinese embassy in the UK also made representations to the Department for Education, expressing concern for the situation of Chinese students in the UK.

=== UCU ===
The "intense infighting" experienced by parts of UCU during and following the 2018 pension strikes and negotiations led UCU to establish a 'democracy commission' to recommend ways to improve participatory democracy within the Union. Among its recommendations was the suggestion that the office of General Secretary should be held for three-year terms, and for a maximum of three terms. The commission suggested introducing a mechanism for members to recall general secretaries. Its recommendations were put to a special congress of the union of 7 December 2019.

=== Scholarly societies ===
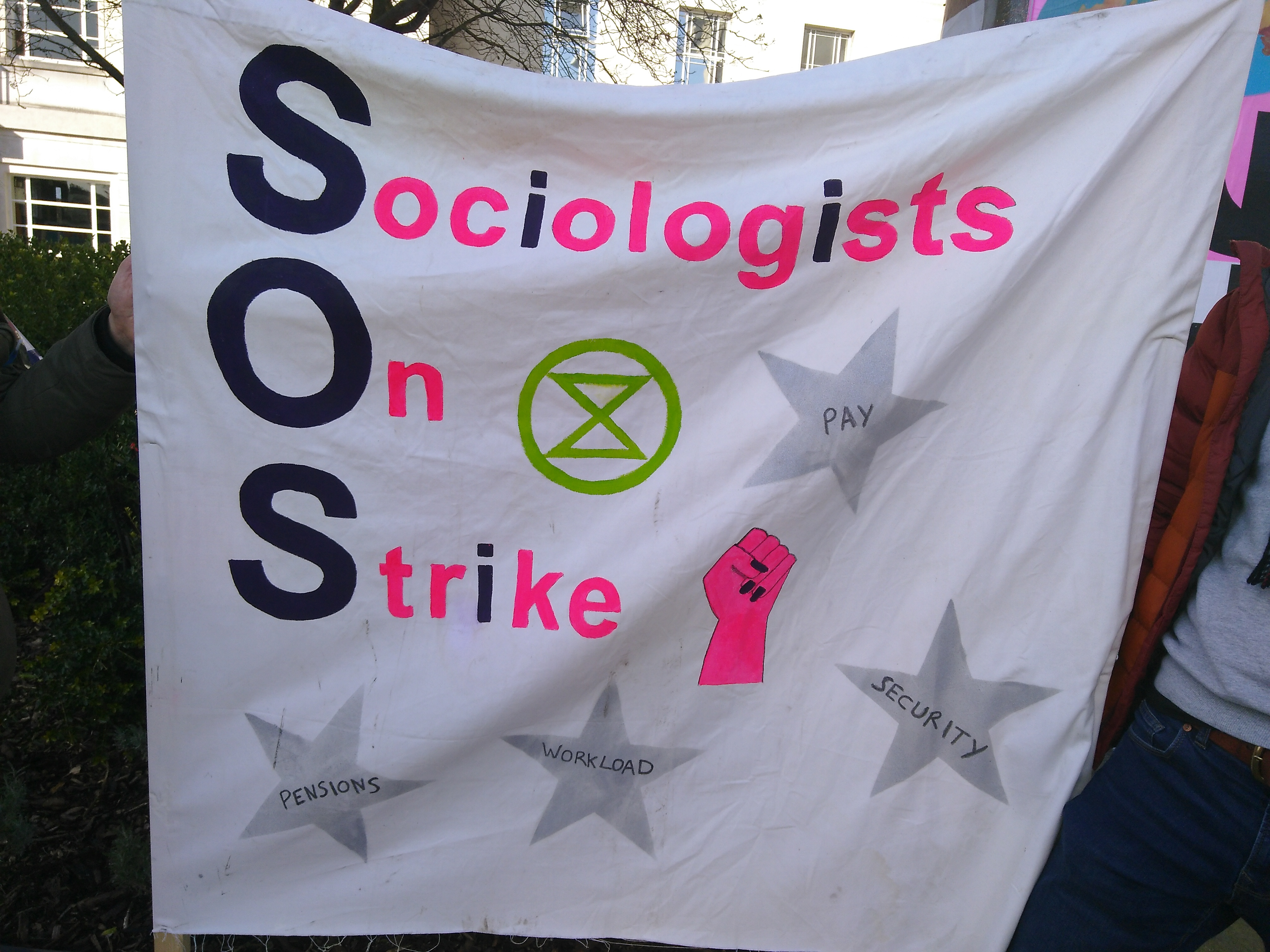
University of Leeds Sociologists on Strike banner

Some scholarly societies issued statements supporting the strike or its goals. They included History UK, which said it 'believes universities should try to maintain the conditions of employment under which academics were originally employed. That includes pensions'; the Engineering Professors' Council; and the British Dental Association. Others did not take a position but did publicly discuss the issues, among them the British Psychological Society.

=== Media ===
==== Traditional media ====
The action attracted national television coverage, and supportive editorials from newspapers including the Observer and the Financial Times, which opined that "the universities must increase their pensions offer, and lecturers should give a fair hearing to any new proposals. Failing that, students should be compensated by the colleges". Support for UUK, meanwhile, was offered in The Times, with Daniel Finkelstein, for example, arguing that "the pension fund is a pot of money shared between current and past staff. All that the trustees and the regulator are trying to do is to make sure it is fairly shared out. They are ensuring the money hasn't all been given away while there are people with future claims against it".

A number of commentators expressed exasperation at a tendency in the media, and on social media, to refer to the strike as a "lecturers' strike", when it involved a wide range of staff, academic and non-academic.

==== Social media ====
UCU members made extensive use of social media during the dispute. They were used to disseminate activists' research on the changes to pensions. Social media were also used to satirise universities' senior management: for example, the hashtag #FindMyProvost was used to mock vice-chancellors who did not engage with staff, and the 'UCU Strikeposting' meme page on Facebook, which was run by students and staff who supported the strike, and quickly amassed over 6,000 likes in 4 weeks. Hashtags were also a powerful organising tool. A prominent example was the Twitter hashtag #NoCapitulation, which emerged as the unifying message university staff rallied behind twenty hours after the Acas agreement of 12 March. Dr Ed Rooksby, a tutor at Ruskin College Oxford, said "the leadership saw this wave of hostility coming towards them and backed down ... I'm sure there wouldn't have been as much momentum without Twitter, and without someone coming up with that hashtag." Dr. Jo Grady, a senior lecturer in employment relations at Sheffield University, stated her belief that Twitter had helped people connect "outside of traditional union frameworks" and that this was ironic as their employers were the ones who encouraged staff to use social media as a tool for self-promotion.

== 2019–20 industrial action on pensions and on the 'four fights' ==
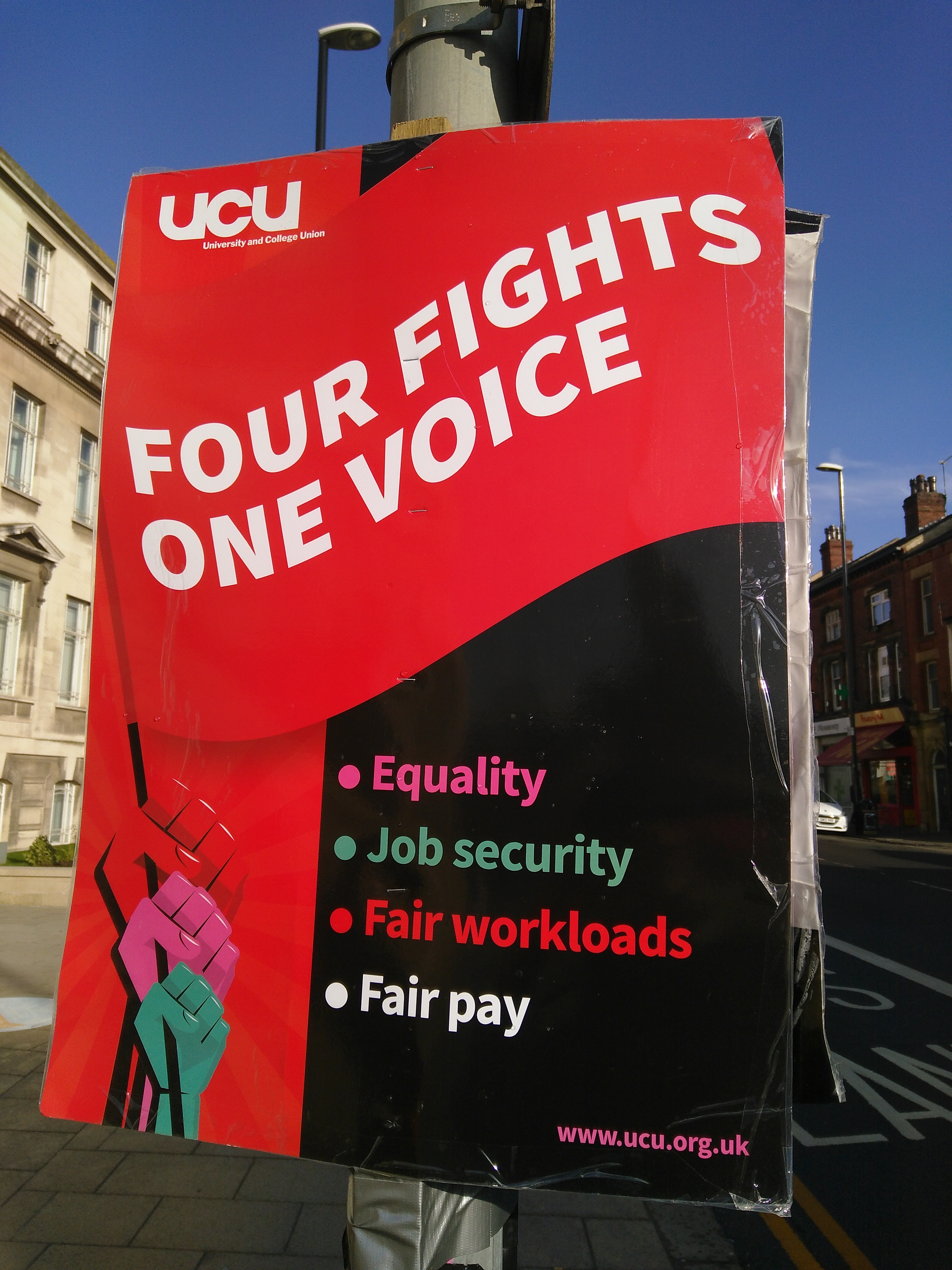
UCU Four Fights placard

According to Esther Muddiman, Rowan Campbell and Grace Krause, "the industrial action undertaken by members of UCU in 2018 in response to a dispute about pensions provision ... acted as a catalyst for discussions about workload, staff wellbeing, equality, pay and conditions – and, we argue, moved the issues of precarity and casualisation up the agenda and brought about new ways of community-building in HE". Accordingly, these concerns formed the basis of ballots for industrial action across all UK higher education unions (UNISON, Unite, EIS, GMB and UCU), running parallel to industrial action on pensions. From September to October 2019, UCU balloted members for industrial action in two disputes: renewed industrial action on pensions (for those institutions participating in USS), and new industrial action on pay and conditions (which UCU called the 'four fights'—pay inequality, job insecurity, rising workloads, and pay deflation—for all higher education branches). Ballots were undertaken separately for each institution in the belief that turnout might pass the 50% of members required by the Trade Union Act 2016 at a sufficient number of institutions to enable meaningful industrial action, while averting the risk of an aggregated national ballot falling below the 50% threshold. It was argued that it was necessary to make industrial action possible on both issues at once to avoid gains to overall remuneration made via one channel being negated by losses on the other.

=== Ballot on USS pensions (31 October 2019) ===
On 26 May 2019, UCU's Higher Education Sector Conference voted to commence a further dispute with USS employers. UCU wrote to relevant vice-chancellors on 7 June asking them to avert possible industrial action by committing "to uphold the level of contributions no higher than 26% (8% for members)", in the first instance by seeking to influence USS policy via employers' representatives on the Employers' Pension Forum (EPF) and the UUK nominees to USS's joint negotiating committee. The Union asked that, failing that, employers "must cover any increases in full that are needed to maintain current benefits until USS's governance and valuation methods and assumptions have been overhauled".

On 31 October 2019, UCU reported that of 64 branches balloted, at least 43 had passed the 50% turnout threshold or were otherwise able to take industrial action. The national aggregate of votes (with four institutions still to be counted) achieved a 53% turnout with 79% voting for strike action.

=== Ballots concerning joint higher education trade union national pay claim (31 October 2019) ===
==== 2018-19 pay negotiations ====
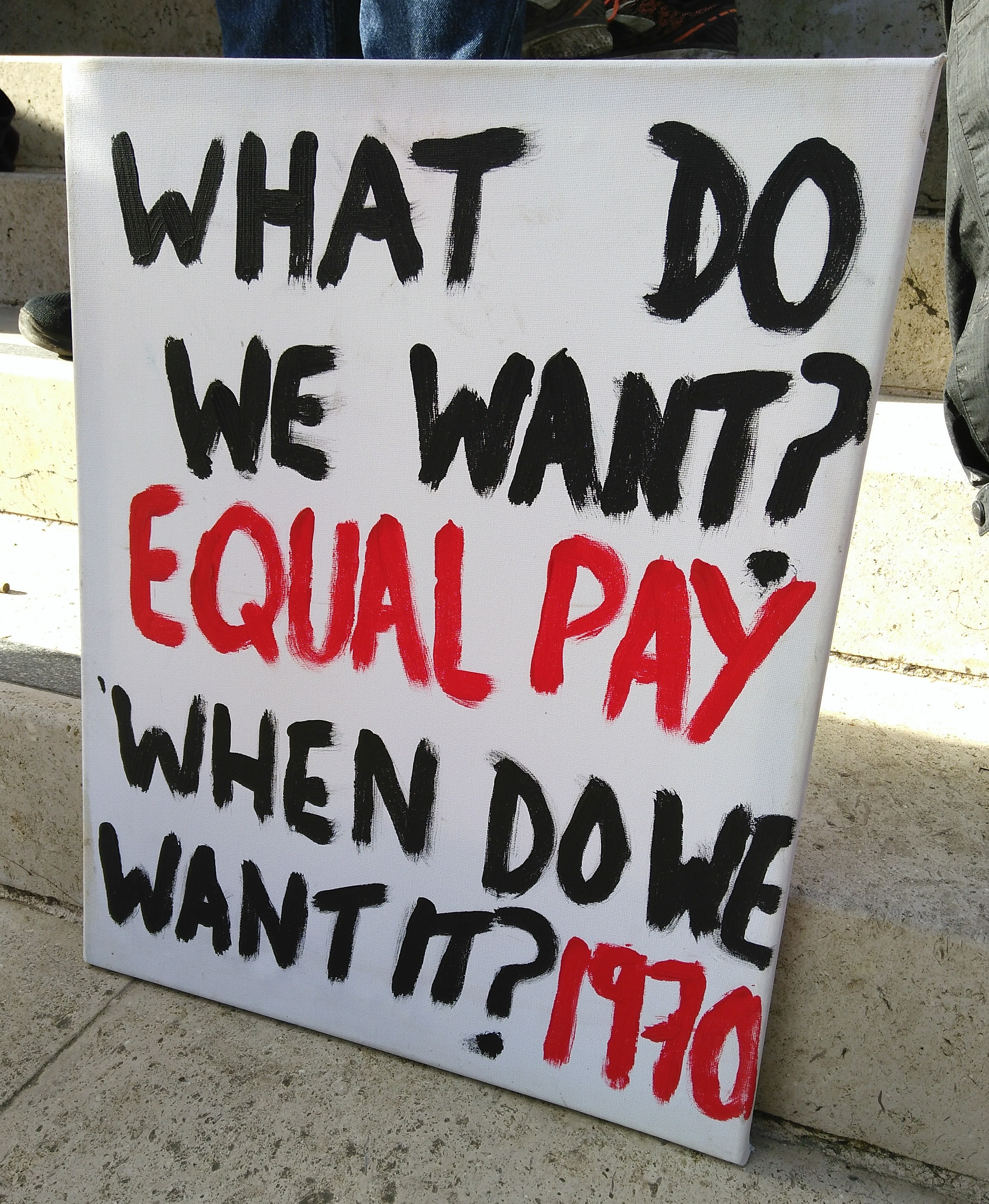
Strike placard relating to the equality component of the "four fights".

In March 2018, the UK's Joint Negotiating Committee for Higher Education Staff began its round of negotiations for pay in the sector for 2018/19, with unions demanding a large pay uplift. Citing long-term real-term declining pay, on 26 March 2018 the unions submitted a pay claim seeking a 7.5% pay increase or £1,500, whichever was greater; a £10 minimum wage to make all higher education institutions "living wage" employers; and gender pay equality by 2020. In April 2018, the Universities and Colleges Employers Association proposed a 1.7% pay increase for 2018–19, raising the offer to 2% (and 2.8% for the lowest paid) in May. These figures were both below inflation, which in March 2018 stood at 2.7%.

On 6 June 2018, UCU commenced a consultative ballot to determine whether to conduct a formal ballot for industrial action in relation to the UK Joint Negotiating Committee for Higher Education Staff's negotiations over 2018-19 pay. The ballot closed on 27 June 2018, with 82% of participating members voting to reject the offer from the university and Colleges Employers' Association of a minimum pay rise of 2 per cent, rising to 2.8 per cent for the lowest paid. UCU formally declared a trade dispute on 24 July 2018. On 21 August 2018, UCU served statutory notice of its intention to ballot members for industrial action regarding the 2018-19 national pay dispute. The ballot opened on 30 August 2018. On 22 October 2018 UCU announced the results of the ballot. Although the majority of Union members who voted elected to take industrial action, the turnout only passed the 50% of members required by the Trade Union Act 2016 at seven universities (alongside which three Northern Irish universities, unaffected by the legislation, also voted to strike). Likewise, on 29 October Unison reported that although a majority of voting members had supported strike action, the vote was frustrated by insufficient turnout. On 7 November, UCU's special higher education sector conference decided to run another ballot, this time aggregating votes across the sector rather than running a different ballot for each university. On 23 November, the ballot was scheduled to run from 14 January to 22 February 2019. This ballot achieved a turnout of only 41%, so again led to no industrial action.

==== 2019-20 pay negotiations ====
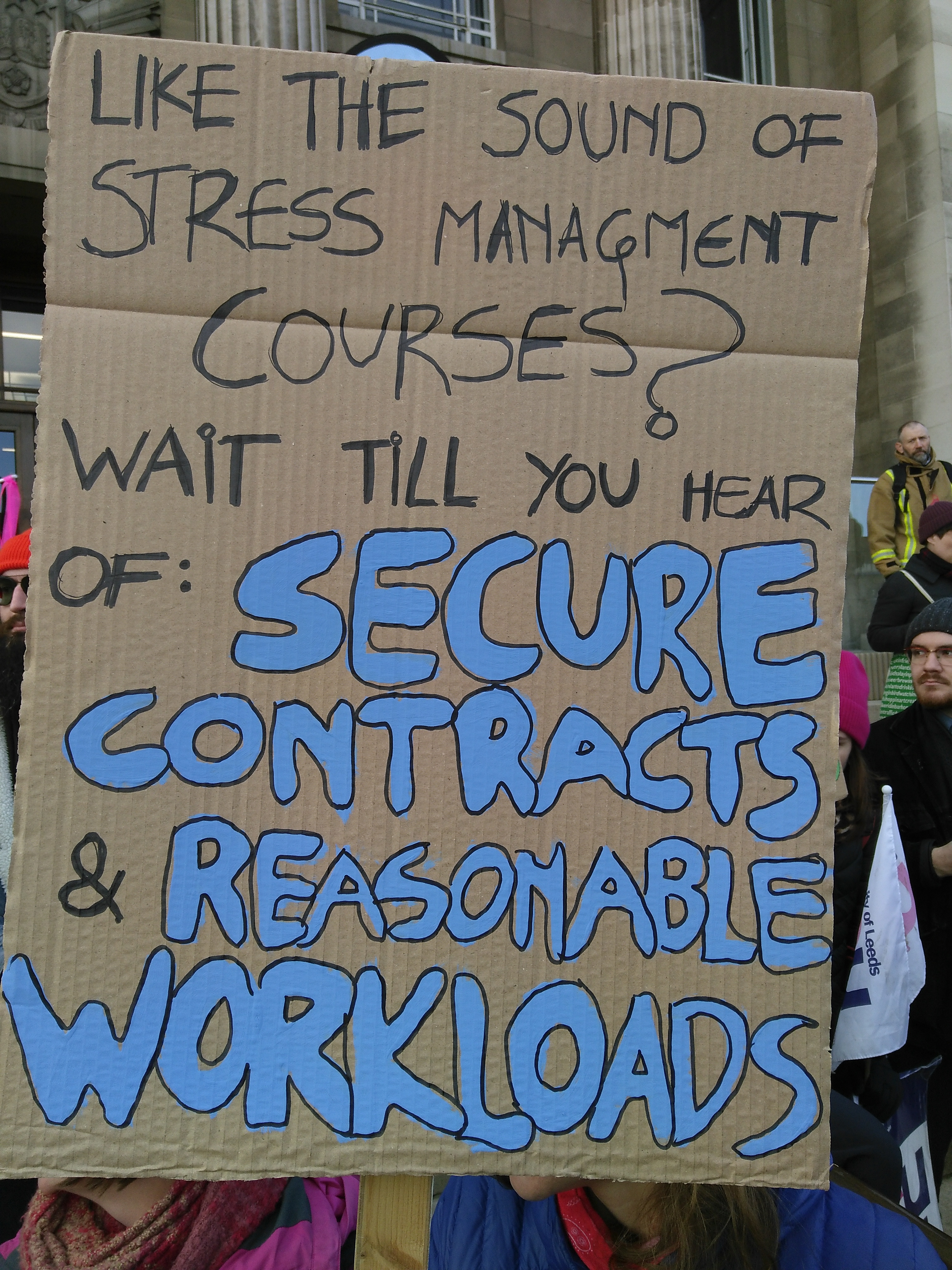
Strike placard relating to the casualisation and workload components of the "four fights".

On 1 May 2019, employers' final offer in the 2019-20 pay negotiations was 1.8%, rising to 3.65% for the lowest paid (deleting the lowest point on the pay scale to ensure a living wage for all staff). For most members, the offered raise was below inflation (then 2.4% RPI), and unions called for an increase of RPI+3% or of £3,349 – whichever was greater. Later that month, the UCU congress resolved to campaign to win an industrial action ballot on this offer, with a campaign naming the 'four fights' of pay, equality, casualisation, and workload. Unite and Unison also resolved to ballot on pay.

On 31 October 2019, Unison reported that although around 66% of members voting had voted for strike action, turnout had not passed the 50% threshold. Likewise, Unite announced that 73.3% of members had voted to take action, but that turnout had been 32.1%.

On the same day, UCU reported that of 148 branches balloted, at least 54 had passed the 50% turnout threshold or were otherwise able to take industrial action. The national aggregate of votes achieved a 49% turnout with 74% voting for strike action (with four institutions still to be counted).

=== UCU announces eight days of strikes (5 November 2019) ===
On 5 November 2019, UCU announced that at those institutions with a legal mandate to strike, eight consecutive strike days would be held from Monday 25 November to Wednesday 4 December, 'unless', in the words of UCU's general secretary Jo Grady, 'the employers start talking to us seriously about how they are going to deal with rising pension costs and declining pay and conditions'. Following 4 December, Union members were also to begin action short of a strike. 60 universities were to be affected (43 regarding both pensions and pay, 14 regarding pay only, and 3 regarding pensions only).

UCU's 2016 workload survey found an average of 51.6 and 50.9 hours a week in further and higher education, respectively, where contracts most often compensate 35–37. Action short of strike notably includes working to contract, implying a decrease of around 15 productive hours a week.

It was estimated that the strikes would affect over a million students.

Spokespeople for UUK and Universities & Colleges Employers Association argued that UCU did not have a strong mandate for action given that the majority of branches had not qualified to take strike action. The UUK spokesperson expressed hopes that the industrial dispute could be resolved without strike action and that UCU 'will now join us to consider governance reforms and alternative options for future valuations' regarding USS. The UCea spokesperson argued that the 2019-20 national pay negotiations had delivered a pay deal 'at the very limit of what is affordable'. Opinion among university leaders was not uniform, however: on 15 November, the vice-chancellor of the University of Essex argued that 'the University of Essex is willing to increase contributions to the scheme to sustain critical features of the USS, including defined benefits'.

On 19 November, UUK and UCEA jointly wrote an open letter 'to staff impacted by the UCU pensions and pay disputes', partly arguing that 'the publication of the JEP's second report will present UUK and UCU with the opportunity to develop a valuable and sustainable future for USS' and that while universities 'simply cannot afford to put more into this year's pay increases than they already have', UCEA had invited negotiations on 'workload, gender pay/equality and casual employment arrangements'. UCU's response included the argument that 'you cannot refuse to talk about pay yet say you want to talk about closing pay gaps that exist for women and BME staff' and that 'we are always keen to negotiate and will attend talks to try and avert the disruption the strikes will inevitably cause'.

=== Strikes take place (25 November – 4 December 2019) ===
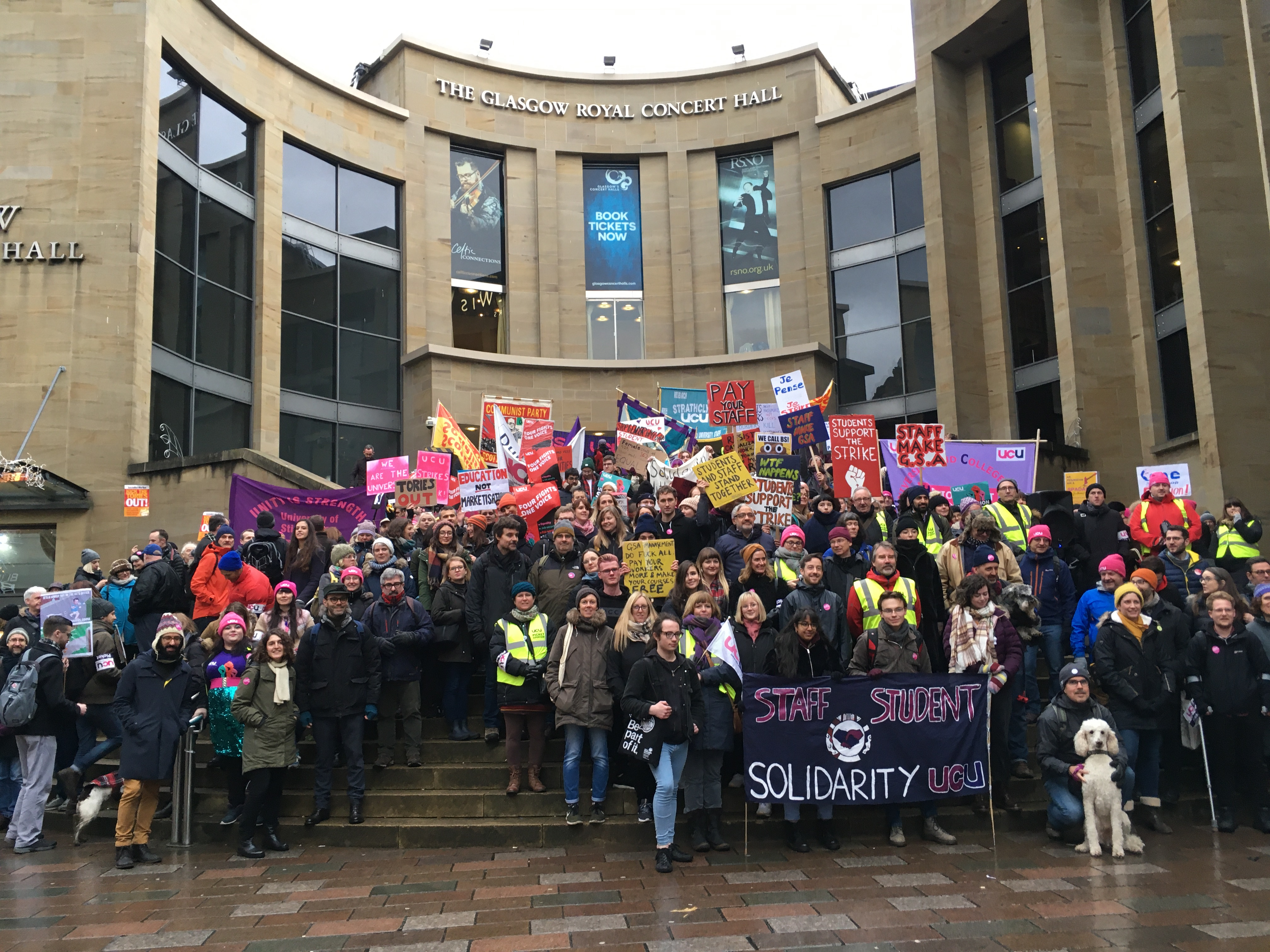
UCU Strike Rally, Buchanan Street, Glasgow.

Strikes began on 25 November. According to figures subsequently gathered by UCEA, 29.2% of UCU members at the affected universities took strike action, representing 5% of all staff at those universities (not all of whom were in the constituency represented by UCU), though around 26% reported pockets of high impact on teaching.

As in 2018, striking staff at a number of universities ran educational 'teach-outs' off campus, which were open to students affected by the strikes. On 27 November, negotiators from UCU and UCEA met, with UCEA pledging to consult its members on 'gender and ethnicity pay gaps, casual employment arrangements and workload' ahead of a meeting the next week, while stating that it had no mandate to alter the pay increase that had been implemented for the 2019–20 academic year.

Employers' organisations continued to argue that the strike represented a minority of staff in a minority of universities, with Oxford Brookes University's vice-chancellor Alistair Fitt arguing further that 'the call for more money comes at a time when universities are operating in a challenging environment amid increased competition, a freeze on tuition fees, and prolonged uncertainty over the implications of Brexit'. A few universities were reported as being heavy-handed in their response to the strikes, with the University of Liverpool attracting criticism for telling its students they must not join picket lines; Sheffield Hallam putting a form online for students to record which lecturers were on strike (which attracted a large number of satirical submissions); and the University of Birmingham telling its staff that picketing on campus would be trespass (which attracted a large petition in opposition). An attempted occupation at the University of Reading in support of the strikes resulted in clashes with "heavy handed" security staff and injuries to the would-be occupiers. The university took disciplinary action against the students involved, banning an undergraduate and a postgraduate student from campus, as well as suspending the undergraduate.

As the strikes began, the Guardian published an editorial arguing that the strikes represented "a battle for the soul of the campus" and that "the market model in higher education has created an intellectual precariat who are right to fight back". Soon after, the Financial Times ran en editorial arguing that "while academics and universities might not want to hear it, if the USS is to continue operating, the money has to come from them", and also saying that "the current industrial action carries wider significance than the fate of a disputed retirement plan. It has exposed the precariousness of Britain's higher education system as it has become more of a marketplace", and calling for an "independent inquiry" into the handling of the USS valuation "by all key players, including the Pensions Regulator".

The National Union of Students supported the strikes, as did the Labour shadow secretary for education, Angela Rayner. Support from individual university students' unions was less clear, with some, such as the University of Birmingham Guild of Students, taking an explicitly neutral stance. Reading University Students Union voted to support the strikes, but was unusual in doing so. The Times reported that 'by and large' students 'support their lecturers and their anger is with universities and vice-chancellors'. In Edinburgh, students occupied David Hume Tower in solidarity with the strike, while students at Strathclyde University occupied a lecture theatre (both in support of the strikes and in protest at what they called 'rampant mismanagement, alleged corruption and irresponsible fossil fuel investment at the University of Strathclyde'). Students at the University of Stirling occupied a management building for two weeks, later receiving an eight-week suspension in punishment.

Some scholarly societies, such as the American Studies Association, expressed support for the strike.

The 2019 strikes took place in a somewhat different regulatory and legal environment from the 2018 ones, due to the establishment of the Office for Students and the emergence of a body of case-law from the Office of the Independent Adjudicator on the compensation of students for lost teaching in the wake of the 2018 strikes. Growing anxiety about the position of international students whose visa requirements for class attendance might be affected by the strikes, in the context of the UK Home Office's hostile environment policy towards migrants, was also in evidence. The University of Liverpool and Goldsmiths University attracted particular attention for telling international students that missing classes on account of refusing to cross picket lines might jeopardise their visas.

=== Following strike action (5–12 December 2019) ===
In the wake of the strike action, UCU called for 'action short of a strike' in the form of 'working to contract', interpreted primarily as working only the hours notionally required and not rescheduling teaching missed during the strikes. As in 2018, universities' responses to this varied, with some threatening pay deductions for 'partial performance' in the event of staff not rescheduling teaching and others not planning to deduct pay. Press coverage included mentioning the University of Liverpool for threatening partial pay deductions and Reading for threatening 100% pay deductions, whereas Cambridge offered to reimburse lecturers for pay lost during the strikes if they rescheduled teaching.

On 4 December, UCU began reballoting thirteen branches which had nearly succeeded in achieving the 50% voter turnout necessary to take strike action, in the belief that the strike action at other branches would galvanise members into voting. It was believed that this would strengthen the threat of further industrial action.

=== Second report of the Joint Expert Panel on pensions (13 December 2019) ===
13 December saw the publication of the Joint Expert Panel's second report. This recommended changes to the governance of USS, to build on "the establishment of a new, jointly agreed purpose statement and shared valuation principles". Reporting focused on the Panel's proposal to introduce a dual discount rate into the USS pension scheme, whereby the fund supporting members who had retired would be put into low-risk, low-return investments, but the remainder of the fund (accruing to working members who had not yet retired) would be free to be invested in higher-risk, higher-return holdings. The report was welcomed by UUK and UCU and media reporting suggested that negotiations in its wake could lead to the cessation of impending industrial action; as strikes loomed in February, however, the UCU general secretary Jo Grady commented that 'most importantly, employers have not yet offered to cover the unfair contribution increases that are pricing members out of the scheme', implying that this was a key sticking point.

The report also recommended three-way talks between UCU, UUK and USS on the governance of USS to lead to future pension policies being more satisfactory to scheme stakeholders. The 'tripartite group' first met on 17 January 2020.

In mid-January 2020, the University of Sussex launched an "industrial action ex gratia scheme" to compensate students up to £100 for inconvenience caused by the ongoing industrial action. It this became the first UK university to offer compensation while industrial action was still in process.

On 15 January, the Wellcome Trust published the report 'What Researchers Think About the Culture They Work In', which found that 29% of respondents felt secure in their jobs. On 20 January, UCU published a report on 'the dehumanising effects of casualisation in higher education' that noted that '67,000 research staff were on fixed-term contracts, making up two-thirds of the total research staff employed at universities, alongside 30,000 contracted teaching staff, many paid by the hour. A further 69,000 academic staff were on "atypical contracts" and so are not counted in the main staff record, while an estimated 6,500 were on zero-hours contracts'.

=== UCEA publish negotiating position (27 January 2020) ===
On 27 January, UCEA published a document 'offered as part of a potential composite JNCHES settlement for 2019-20' addressing the Four Fights issues, with the exception of pay (where the pay rise offered remained at 1.8%). UCEA noted that it had been 'given the scope to go further than ever before as a national employer representative body', proposed to set 'expectations' for the employment practices of individual institutions, and summarised its offer at sector-level thus:

- For contractual arrangements, a new trade union/employer working group to examine the annual national staff record (HESA), looking for example at trends in 'zero hours' and 'hourly-paid' employment, and contractual arrangements across protected characteristics. The group will produce a report of the analysis and findings.
- For workload and mental health, trade union/employer work to further develop the national Stress and Mental Wellbeing resources through our established HE Safety and Health Forum, Trade unions, Universities UK and UCEA involvement in advancing sector-level initiatives to address staff mental health issues.
- For gender pay gap, trade unions and employers to develop an HE specific 'checklist' of suggestions to address blockages and enablers of women's career progression and balanced representation in gender dominated roles. There will also be collection and analysis of the overall data.
- On ethnicity pay, trade unions and employers to examine and report on national ethnicity pay gap data and investigate kinds of actions and interventions being taken by employers. Both also commit to encouraging colleagues to disclose protected characteristics.

UCU welcomed these offers as progress but criticised the lack of an improved offer on pay and argued that UCEA needed to provide universities with 'a clear set of mechanisms for policing and enforcing the expectations which they are signing up to'.

=== Fourteen more universities ballot for strike action (29 January 2020) ===
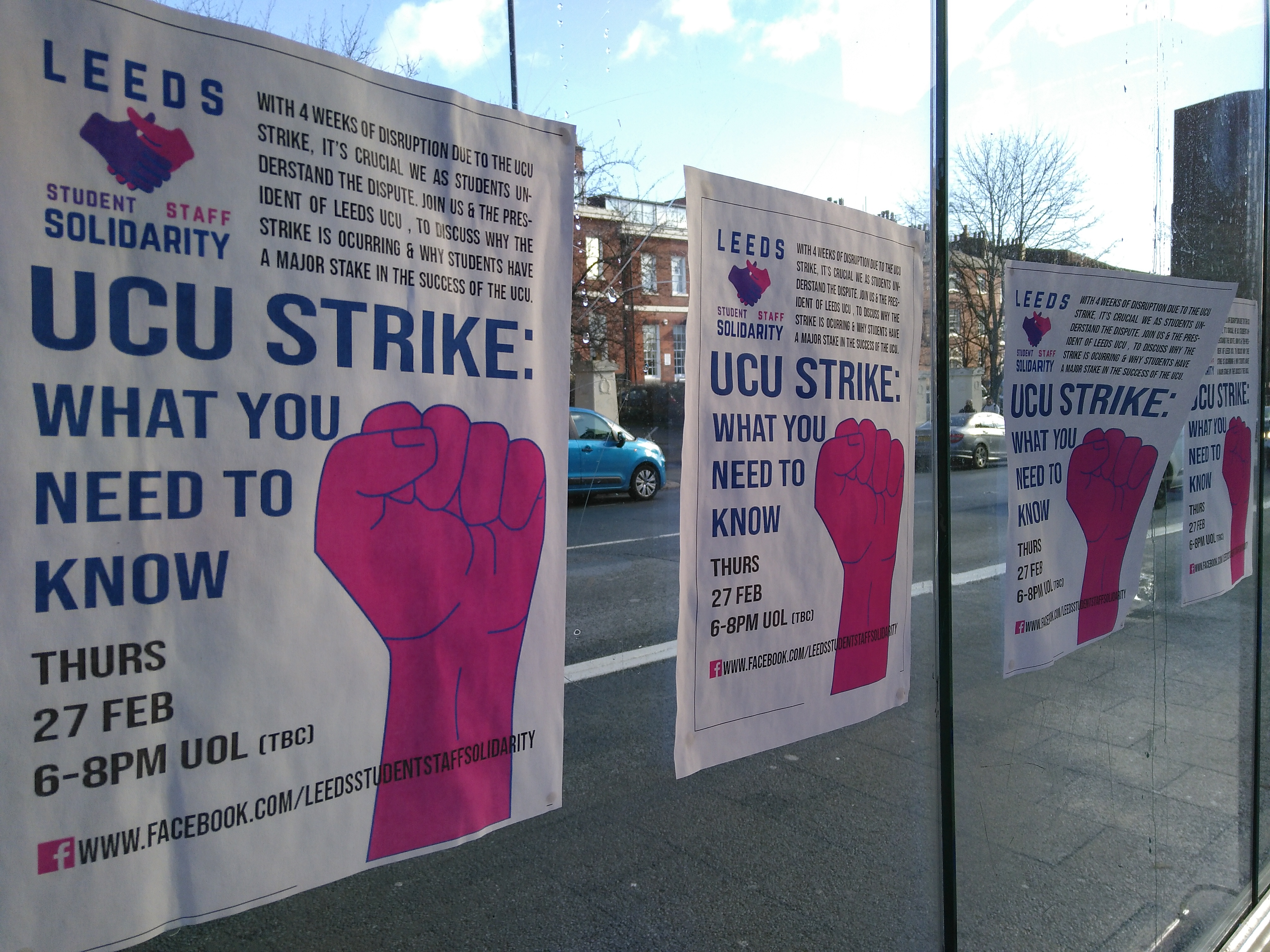
Posters in Leeds, February 2020.

On 29 January 2020, UCU announced results from the December–January reballots of selected universities that had failed to secure a 50% turnout in the 2019 ballots. As a result, two further universities joined the disputes on pensions and pay/conditions; nine joined the dispute on pay/conditions alone; and three joined the dispute on pensions alone; and two that had been on strike about pensions only added pay/conditions to their disputes. The number of institutions with a mandate to strike at this point stood at 74 in total: 47 for pay/conditions and pensions, 22 for pay/conditions only, and 5 for pensions only.

=== Strikes recommence (20 February 2020) ===
==== Before the strikes ====
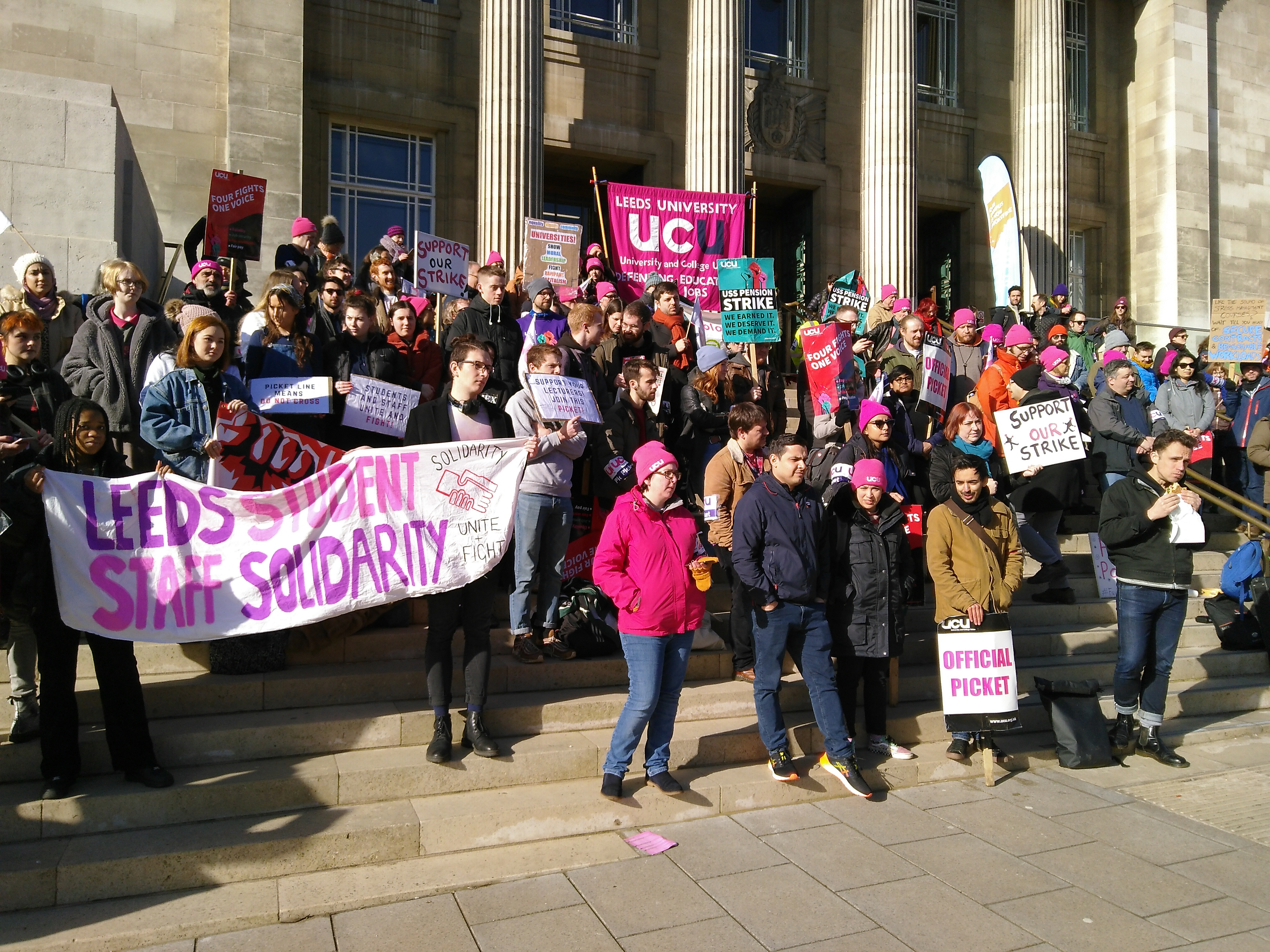
University of Leeds strike rally outside the Parkinson Building, 26 February 2020.

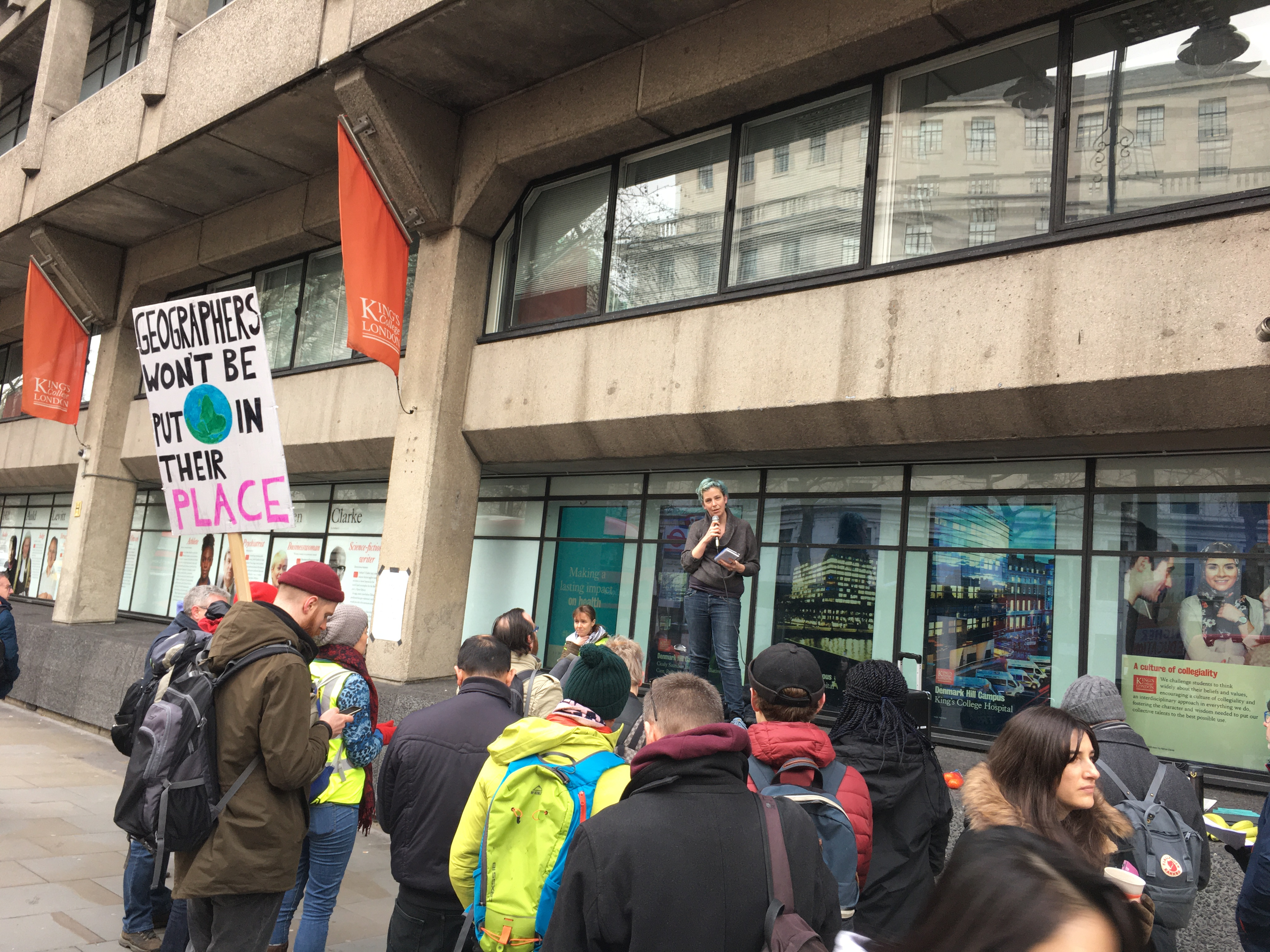
UCU teach-out at KCL entrance during March 2020 industrial action

On 3 February 2020, following consultation with branch representatives at the union's Higher Education Committee, UCU announced fourteen days of strike action, escalating over a period running from 20 February to 13 March: 20–21 February, 24–26 February, 2–5 March and 9–13 March.

During February, UUK consulted its members on the possibility of making a new offer in the pensions dispute, responding to UCU's request that employers shoulder more of the burden of rising pensions contributions. 84% opposed the idea of making a new offer. Meanwhile, UCEA did not alter the offer it had made on 27 January. During the same period, the Times Higher Education reported restiveness among some UCU members about the desirability of further strikes.

==== Weeks 1–2 (20–26 February) ====
Strikes began on 20 February, with 74 universities affected, and news reporting on the day focusing on the determination of striking staff picketing in rainy weather. Following a few days with little apparent progress, UCEA resumed negotiations with UCU on Monday 24 February, and UUK resumed negotiations on Tuesday 25th. Negotiations continued throughout that week.

==== Week 3 (2–5 March) ====
Negotiations went on and, following the leaking of minutes from a Russell Group meeting about casualisation, the Russell Group issued a statement pledging to address casualisation in that part of the university sector.

By the end of the third week of strike action (Friday 6 March), UCU summarised the position of negotiations as showing good progress on achieving a UK-wide, sector level framework to address casualisation, gender pay-gaps, and workload, with continued debate concerning the pay deal. Regarding pensions, the Union represented UUK as putting more pressure on USS for reform, but little progress on convincing employers to shoulder a higher proportion of rising pension contributions.

==== Week 4 (9–13 March) ====
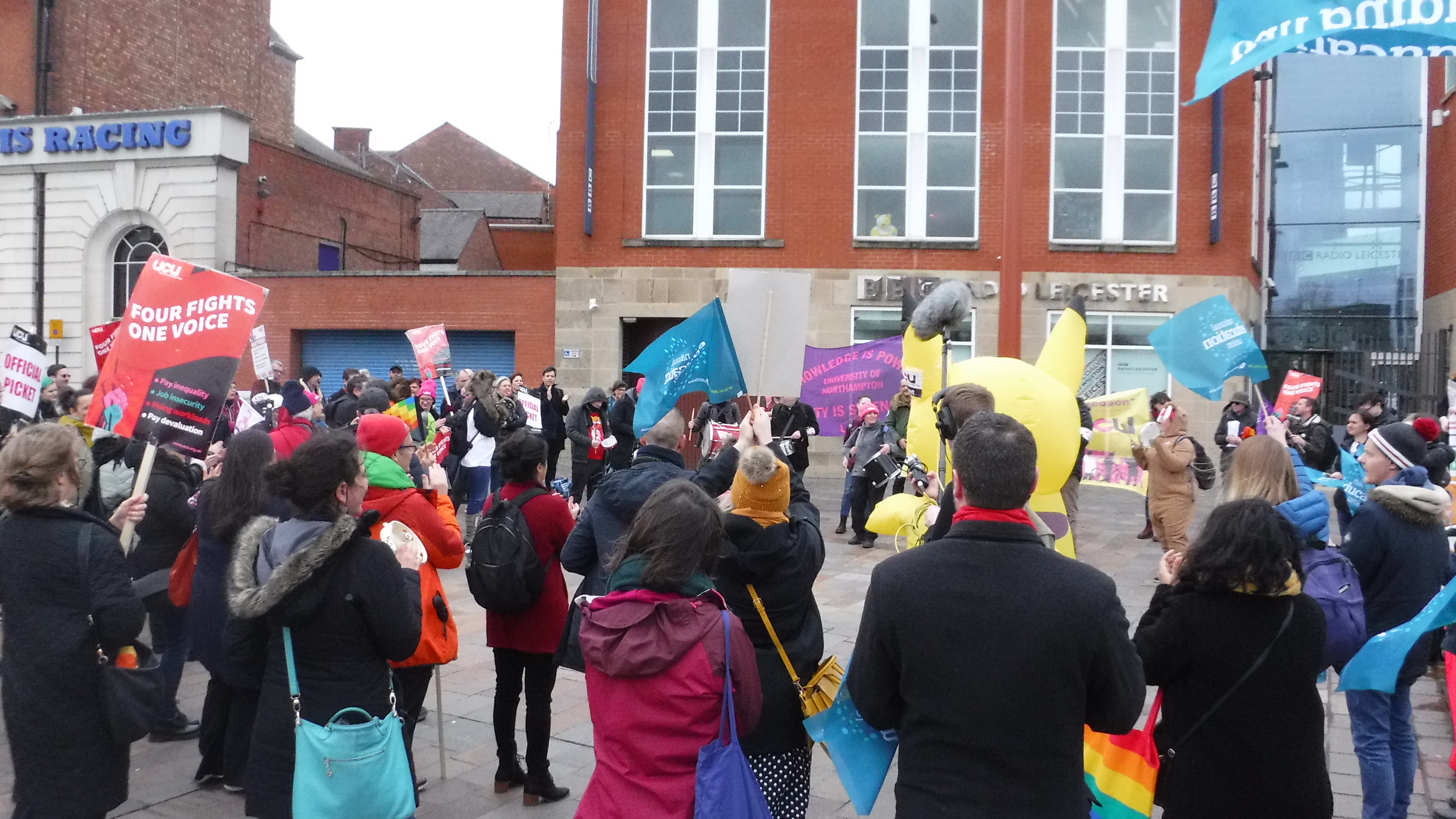
Leicester education rally 10 March 2020

Little news emerged from negotiations, and on 11 March UCU negotiators on the Four Fights made it clear that good progress had been made on three, but that the sticking point for them was pay, and argued that UCU members would need to continue industrial action to achieve improvements in that area.

Meanwhile, debate on USS was complicated by USS beginning their 2020 valuation, with UCU criticising USS's valuation methods and calling on UUK for support. No significant change appeared to have come about in employers' willingness to shoulder more of the rising costs of the pension scheme.

As the strikes came to an end, UK universities found themselves under a relatively sudden set of pressures as the COVID-19 pandemic led to falling projections for international student recruitment, and UK universities rapidly switching their teaching to online modes. UCU cancelled rallies on the last day of strikes to reduce the risk of infection.

==== Responses to the strike ====
Student support at the outset of the strike was estimated at 47% by an unscientific poll reported by the BBC. With continued NUS support for the strikes, twenty-six students' unions wrote to the Minister of State for Universities, the chairs of the UCEA and USS trustee boards and the Chief Executive of Universities UK, expressing support for UCU and urging a swift resolution to the strikes. As in previous strikes, there were student occupations, in this case of the Old Schools in Cambridge and the South Cloisters of UCL.

UCU members continued to find innovative ways to picket, with developments including a group of picketing runners circumnavigating the University of Leeds campus.

== Developments from March 2020 to December 2021 ==
=== Pandemic and cessation of industrial action ===
The prospect of convulsive changes to university staff workload and working conditions caused by universities' responses to the pandemic increased the complexities and tensions surrounding the dispute. To continue legally constituted industrial action, most branches needed to reballot for action shortly after March 2020; however, the reballots on both disputes were postponed due to the crisis, and the legal mandate for industrial action expired on 28 April 2020.

==== 2020–21 student rent strikes ====
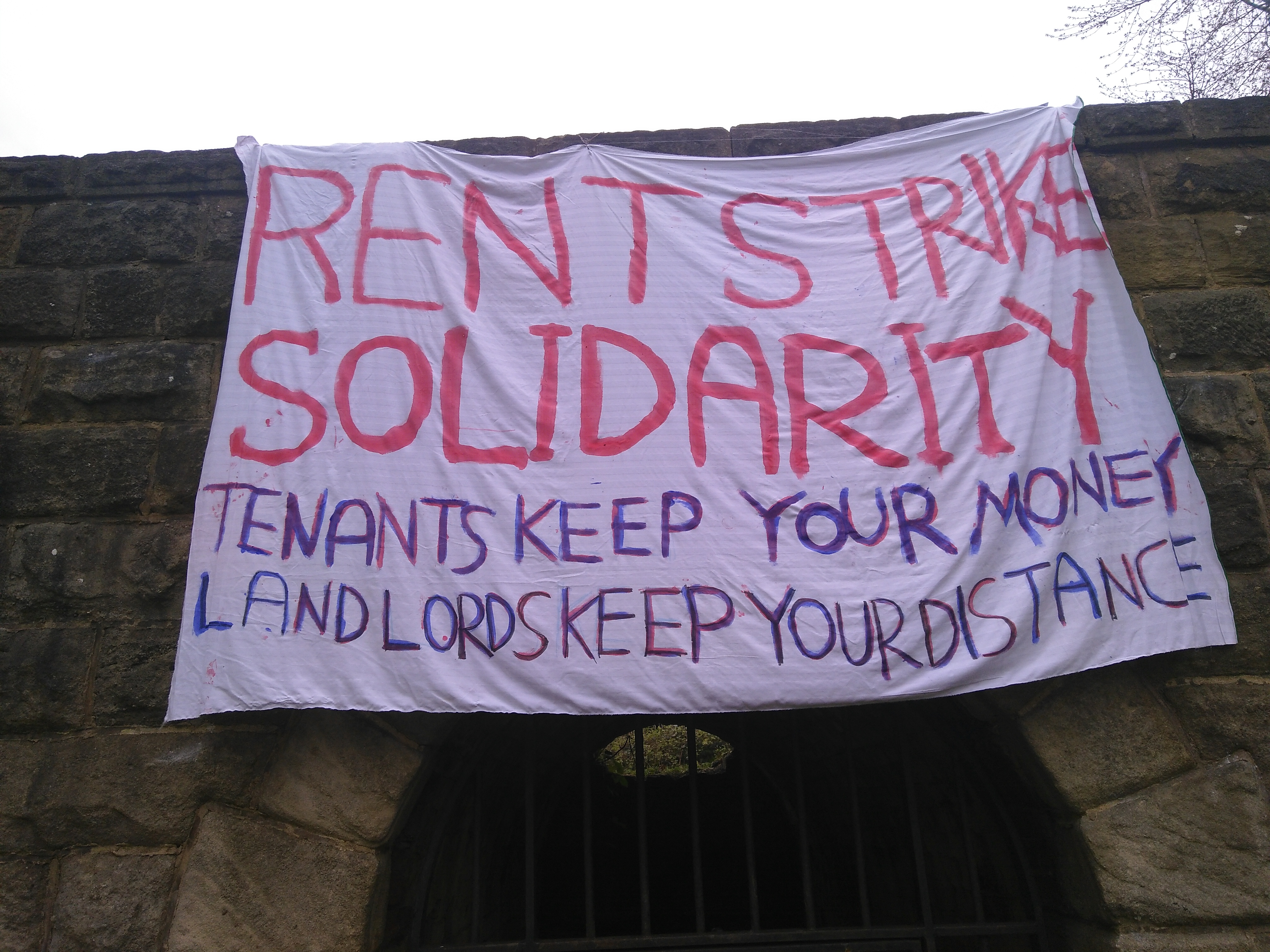
Rent strike solidarity banner, Leeds, April 2020

While university staff did not take industrial action widely during 2020–21, students in a number of universities organised rent strikes to force rebates on rent payments for student accommodation, arguing that they were not being given the in-person education that they had been promised and which they were renting accommodation to access. Students at the University of the West of England and Bristol University were among early organisers, beginning rent strikes in March 2020 against many landlords who continued to charge them full priced rent. While triggered by situations arising from the COVID-19 pandemic, these protests were in the wider context of rapidly rising student rents. The 2020 University of Manchester protests were particularly prominent: Manchester students launched a rent strike and occupation in November 2020, calling for a 40 percent rent reduction for the duration of the 2020/21 academic year, for the option of ending their tenancies early without penalty, and for additional help for self-isolating students. In response to the rent strike the university cut rent by 30 percent for all students in university halls of residence. Rent strikes were also announced in Autumn 2020 at the University of Glasgow, which resulted in a one-month rent rebate, and the University of Cambridge. By January 2021, reporting suggested that between 40 and 55 universities had rent strikes underway.

Furthermore, Student claims companies discuss how students can claim financial compensation if their university experience was affected by COVID-19 disruptions or other issues like online learning, canceled classes, or lecturer strikes, especially in cases where universities may have not delivered the services they agreed to provide. The compensation amount depends on the course, the extent of disruption, and the fees charged by the university. They operate on a no-win, no-fee basis, charging a fee of one-third of the compensation amount only if the claim is successful, and emphasize that students are protected by consumer law to make such claims.

=== Four fights negotiations ===
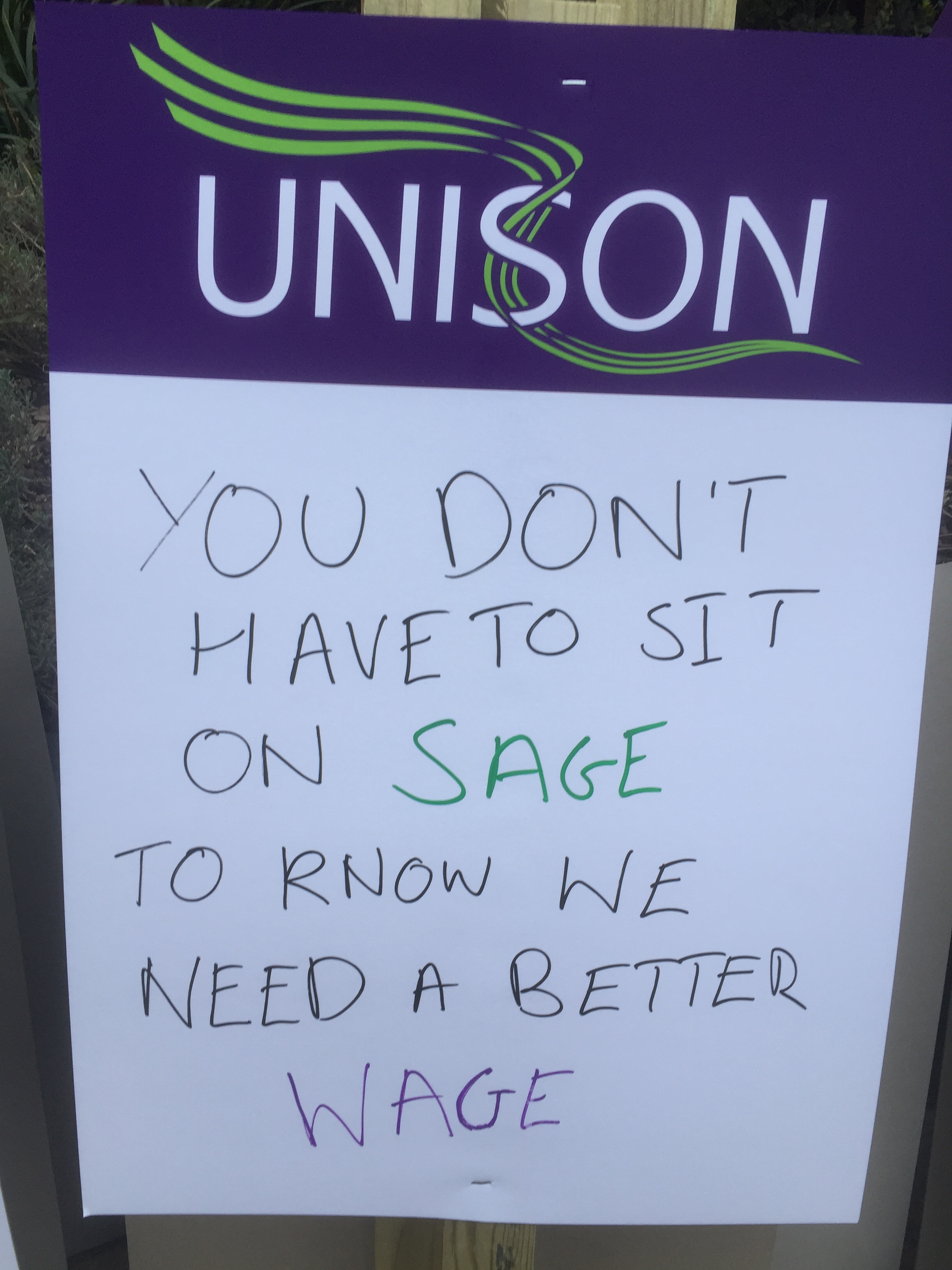
Unison placard from 2022 strikes, alluding to the UK Scientific Advisory Group for Emergencies

Against the backdrop of a cessation in industrial action, the closure of UK campuses, and an improvised sector-wide shift to online teaching, along with tensions over whether universities were fulfilling their obligations to provide safe working environments, negotiations between UCU and UCEA continued. On 1 April 2020, UCEA tabled a new offer regarding the Four Fights dispute. As before, there was no increase in UCEA's previous pay increase offer of 1.8%, but the offer did include more explicit resolutions to establish sector-wide 'expectations' and 'recommendations' that all employers should implement through action and negotiation with unions at a local level. On 16 May UCU announced that it would convene representatives from its branches on 26 May with a decision about the Union's next step to be taken by its Higher Education Committee the next day. Branch delegates opposed the offer, and in July 2020 UCU undertook an electronic consultative ballot of its members, likewise recommending rejection. 61% of respondents rejected the offer and 39% accepted. In consequence, UCEA unilaterally implemented a "1.8% uplift on all points on the spine, with higher percentage awards for points 2 to 16".

Before UCU and UCEA's pay negotiations pertaining to 2019–20 concluded, a new round of negotiations, concerning 2020–21, commenced. UCU submitted a pay claim pertaining to 2020–21 in March 2020, before the effects of the COVID-19 pandemic began to be recognised in the UK, and which continued the Four Fights agenda. UCEA made their final 2020–21 offer in January 2021, proposing to freeze pay except at the bottom end of the pay spine, but to seek paths to jointly address casualisation, workload, pay gaps, career development, and a national framework for the 35-hour working week. Rejected in a February 2021 ballot of UCU members by 86.2% to 13.8%, the pay freeze was unilaterally implemented by UCEA in August 2020.

By the time UCEA had implemented the unagreed August 2020 pay freeze, UCU had shifted its campaigning focus to the 2021–22 pay negotiations, which on a normal schedule would determine pay levels for the academic year beginning in August 2021. In March 2021 UCU and other campus unions submitted a claim seeking "a pay uplift of £2,500 on all pay points", "tackling intersectional pay inequality, dealing with excessive workloads, stress and mental health linked to COVID-19, and addressing wide spread precarious contracts". The claim also developed the Union's position on casualisation by calling for postgraduate researchers to be employed to teach on contracts more like fixed-term, part-time contracts, with associated benefits such as sick pay, than like zero-hours contracts.

UCEA's opening pay offer, in April 2021, was 1.1% overall (with the details of implementation open for discussion); in May UCEA made their final offer, with a headline figure of 1.5%. UCEA stressed their willingness to work on issues other than pay, and the financial pressures on some member universities, presenting the offer as the furthest the sector could prudently stretch; meanwhile, UCU criticised both the proposed pay increase and what they saw as a lack of firm commitment on other Four Fights issues. UCU rejected the offer during the summer and moved to take industrial action.

Meanwhile, some local branches reported progress on casualisation, with the Open University agreeing to move over 4,000 associate lecturers onto permanent contracts in July 2021.

=== USS negotiations ===
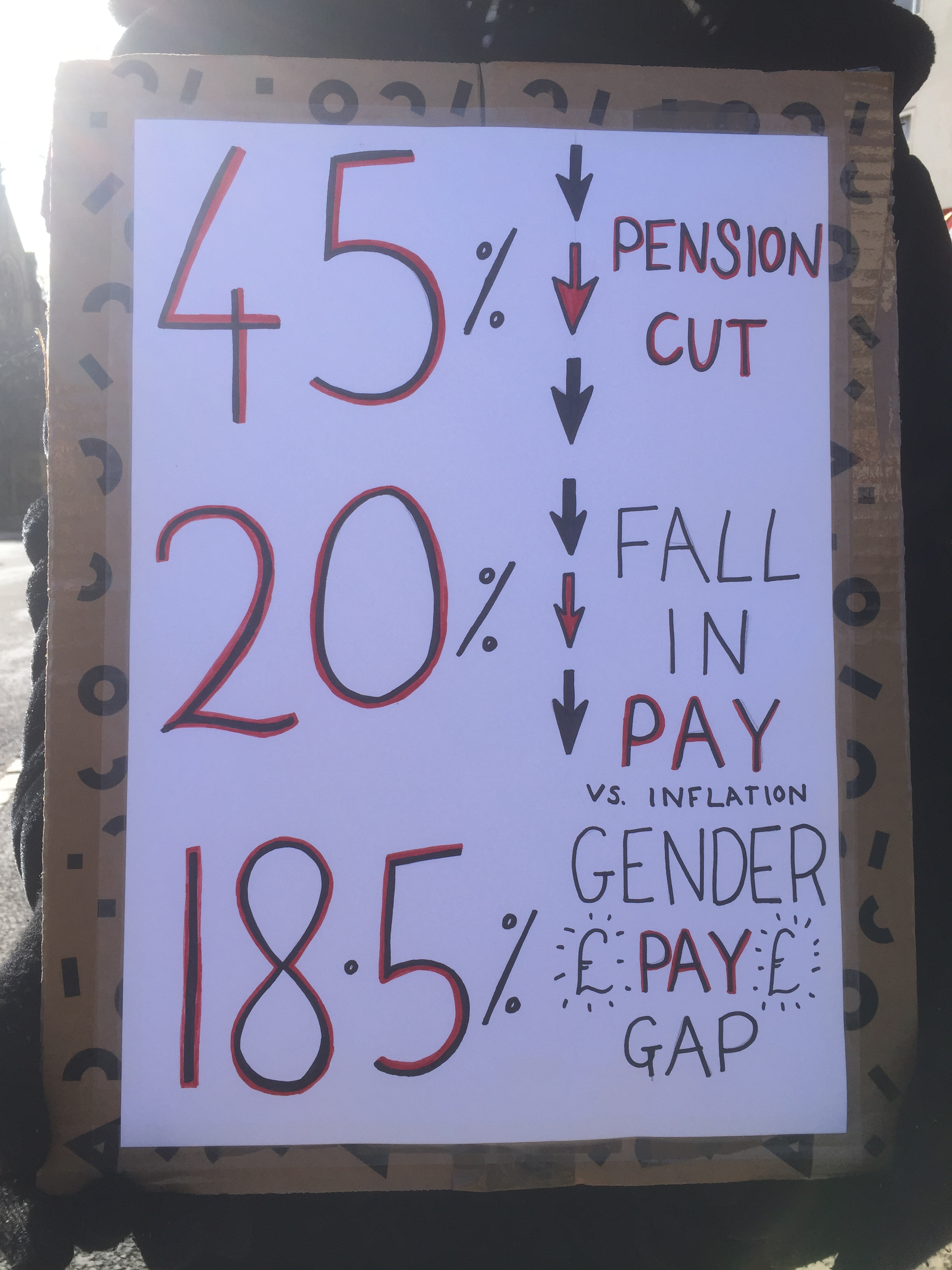
2022 strike placard, adverting to a widely advertised estimate of pension cuts

The dispute over the USS pension was also cast into a new light by the economic shock of the pandemic and fears over the short-time financing of the UK higher education sector; the fund breached a self-sufficiency measure on 12 March and reported itself to The Pensions Regulator accordingly.

In April 2020, UCU and UUK issued a joint statement on their position in relation to USS, in this respect presenting a united front against the pension trustees; Alistair Jarvis, the chief executive of UUK, published a prominent Times Higher Education article entitled "Attractive pensions benefits are possible without huge price hikes".

Meanwhile, July 2020 saw UUS expressing its willingness to reconsider some of its methodologies, while stressing the profundity of the COVID crisis, the aversion to risk of The Pensions Regulator, and the need for employers in the USS scheme explicitly to express their "long-term commitment to the scheme that will allow us to rely on their collective strength for the next 30 years".

However, tensions grew following USS's statutory 2020 valuation of the pension scheme, which fell in the midst of the crisis in financial markets associated with the COVID-19 pandemic. USS published the plans arising from this valuation and commenced a statutory consultation about the proposed changes on 7 September 2020; estimates prominently included the proposal that contributions to the pension fund might have to rise to between 40.8% and 67.9% of salaries to curtail the scheme's rising deficit. Maintaining a degree of consensus, both UUK and UCU criticised these proposals, arguing that they showed an unnecessary aversion to risk and made unrealistic contribution demands on individual staff and employers alike.

Over the coming months, the validity of USS's 2020 valuation would become a topic of fierce debate. USS argued that the unusual market conditions at the time had both positive and negative effects on the outlook of fund and that, net, the valuation was representative of the fund's standing. In March 2021, UUK challenged the valuation and particularly questioned the role of The Pensions Regulator in shaping USS's assessment. Other commentators argued that the valuation was methodologically flawed, yet came to varying conclusions about the policy implications. Meanwhile, in November 2021, two scheme members, Neil Davies and Ewan McGaughey, went so far as to initiate legal action against USS, crowd-funded to the tune of over £50,000 by around 1500 USS members, accusing the trustees of negligence towards scheme beneficiaries and seeking to halt proposed pension cuts while accelerating USS's divestment from fossil fuel companies. USS commented that the case "has absolutely no merit". On 28 February 2022, the High Court agreed to hear the case, scheduling a hearing for March 21.

Faced with USS's insistence on a dramatic weakening of the pension benefits and/or a dramatic increase in contributions, the fragile consensus between UCU and UUK collapsed around April 2021, with UUK seeking to sustain the then current contribution rates and to weaken benefits while UCU continued to press for a profound rethinking of the valuation, design, and governance of the scheme. At a meeting of the scheme Joint Negotiating Committee in August 2020, the following competing proposals were considered, and the chair's deciding vote favoured UUK's position:

	UUK proposal	UCU proposal
employer contribution	21.1% (no change)	24.9% (3.8% rise)
employee contribution	9.6% (no change)	8.1% (1.5% drop)
accrual rate (previously 1/75)	1/85	1/80
salary threshold up to which defined benefits accrue (previously £55,000)	£40,000	£40,000
cap for inflation-proofing benefits (previously full protection up to 5% and half between 5% and 15%)	2.5%	no change to cap (with costs of inflation over 2.5% borne by employers)
membership	no flexible option for members who wish to join USS and earn a guaranteed pension	members who spend over three months in USS entitled to the same benefits as everyone else.

There was also debate about how most accurately to model the outcome of proposed changes for scheme members, with UUK arguing that the changes would be less detrimental than UCU believed. On 29 November 2021, just before strike action commenced, UCU noted that its modelling was consistent with USS's most recent estimates, suggesting that "cuts to guaranteed, defined benefit pensions built up in the future would amount to 41% for a USS member earning around £39k, a typical lecturer salary" in USS's model, and 35% in UCU's, whereas UUK had suggested a reduction of 10–18%. UCU accused UUK of misleading the vice chancellors whom it was representing.

== Industrial action December 2021 – July 2023 ==
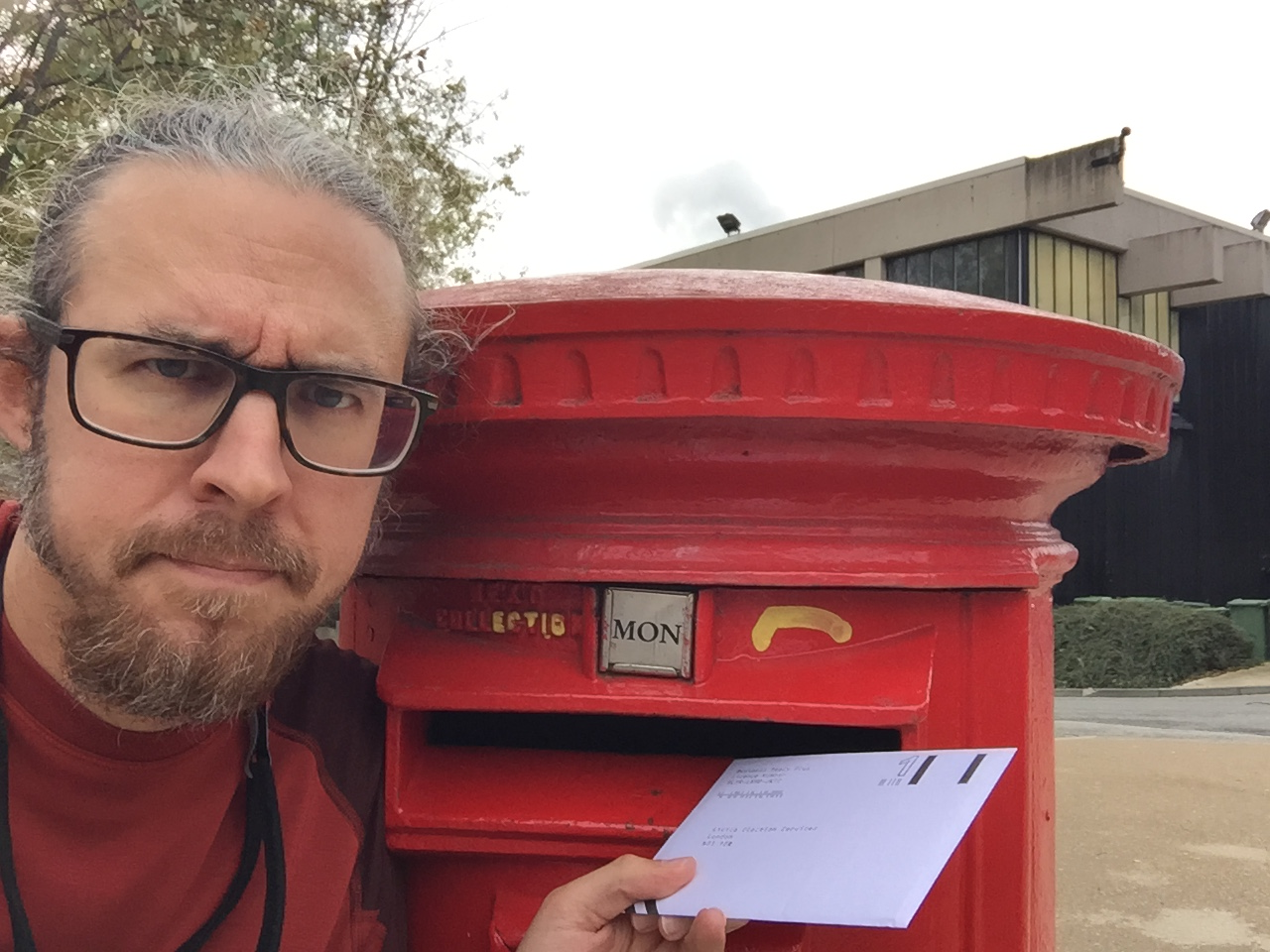
A UCU member ostentatiously posts their industrial action ballot paper in October 2021

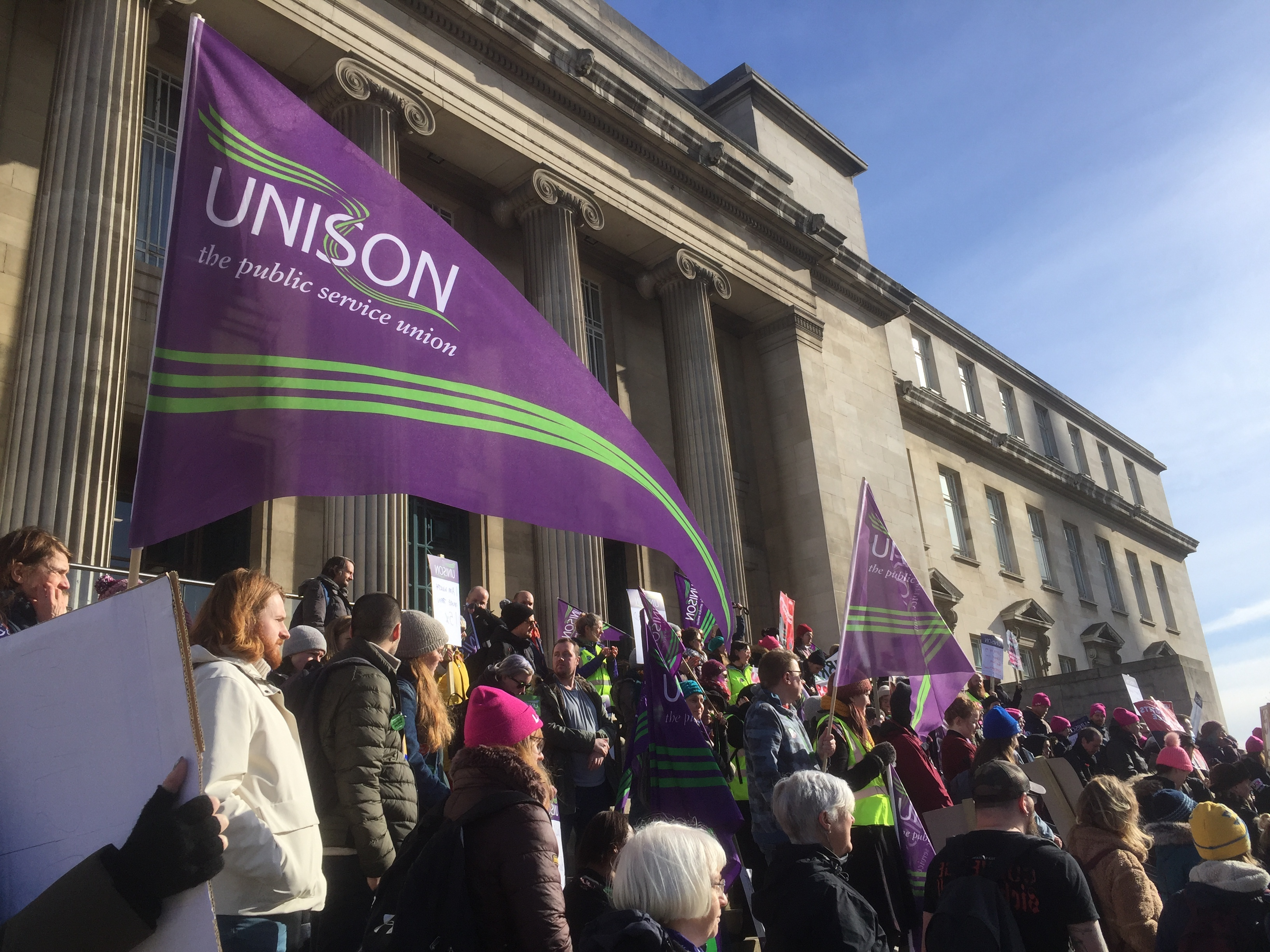
Unison members on strike at Leeds University (mirror image)

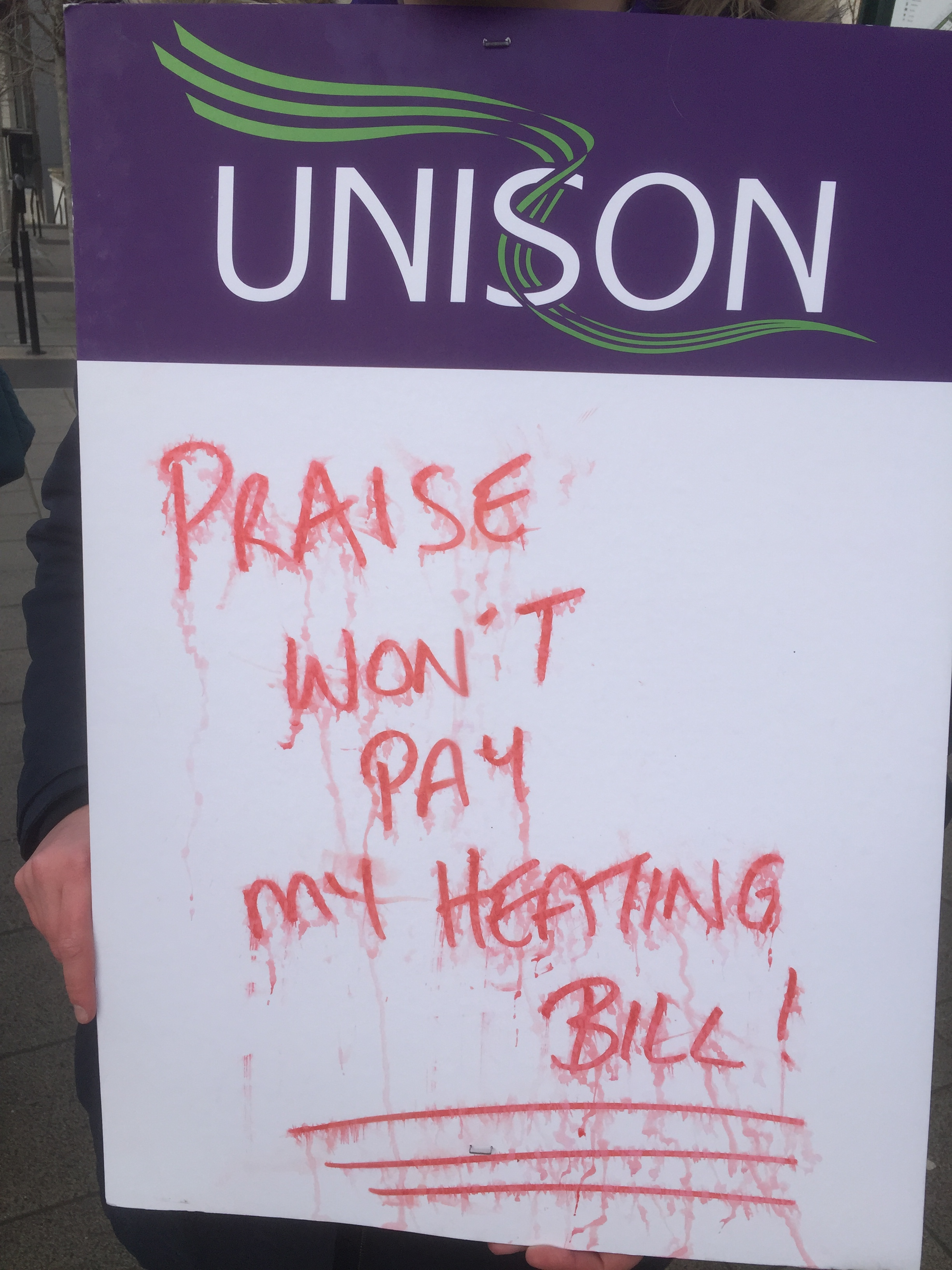
Unison placard, alluding to rising energy costs and falling pay

In October–November 2021, with UK university teaching moving back towards normality following a year dominated by online teaching in 2020–21, UCU once more balloted its members on both pensions and the Four Fights. Industrial action during 2021-22 took place in the context of inflation in the United Kingdom spiking for the first time in over a decade, eroding the real value of pay, pensions, and student fee income, increasing financial worries for both employers and employees in the sector.

=== December 2021 ===
On 4–5 November 2021, UCU announced that of the 68 institutions polled regarding USS, 37 had met the legal minimum turnout threshold for taking industrial action, while of the 145 balloted about the Four Fights, 56 had done so. These figures were very similar to the ballot results in 2019, despite the tumultuous events of the pandemic year 2020–21. In total, 58 institutions voted for strike action of some kind, and 64 for action short of a strike. On 16 November, UCU announced that an initial round of strike action would run from 1–3 December, and that action short of a strike would commence in the form of working to contract.

Accordingly, strikes took place at affected universities 1–3 December 2021. As in previous years, strikes included teachouts, including teachouts hosted online by UCU nationally rather than at branch level alone, along with other activities such as music and running pickets. UCEA claimed that institutions where strikes took place saw one third of UCU members, or 9% of total staff, actually striking. UCU did not recommend that staff should refuse to make up missed teaching following these strike days, though this policy was reversed regarding strikes in February–March 2022.

The National Union of Students supported the industrial action, citing polling evidence that suggested that 73% of its members supported staff in their industrial action and that 9% were opposed; some local student union branches, however, opposed the strikes. Students at Sheffield and Manchester undertook occupations of university buildings in support of the strikes.

Focusing on pensions, The Times ran an editorial arguing that "it's not a welcome message for academics but they need to get real about the costs of their retirement incomes and to contribute more during their working lives", and argued that defined benefits pensions should be jettisoned not only by USS but also by the public sector: "A productive economy needs enterprises and workers that take risks ... A better balance could be achieved by ensuring that the public sector shifts more of the responsibility for pension planning on to individuals, just as happens in almost all commercial organisations". Conversely, The Guardian focused on pay and conditions, arguing that "vice-chancellors and managers should reflect on why levels of staff morale in higher education have plummeted to the extent that industrial action is becoming an annual affair. As the sector has been expanded and transformed through marketisation, the working conditions of those employed within it have markedly deteriorated. Insecure, poorly paid short-term contracts are the norm for younger academics, who are unable to plan their lives with any confidence in what the future may bring."

=== February – August 2022 ===
Just after the December 2021 strike finished, UCU began running reballots in 40 branches that had come close to meeting the 50% minimum voter turnout, with an aim of achieving greater strike actions in 2022. Meanwhile, in January, UCU submitted revised proposals for the USS pension scheme to UUK, without gaining UUK's support.

Ballot results declared on 18 January 2022 added a further ten branches to the action (seven with a mandate for strike action on USS and nine on the Four Fights), and UCU declared that strikes would take place for ten days from February 14 to 2 March (14–18 and 21–22 February for all institutions striking on USS; 21–22 February and 28 February to 2 March for all institutions striking on the Four Fights). Meanwhile, Unison branches at 37 universities balloted on strike action from 6 December to 28 January (England and Scotland) or 9 February (Northern Ireland); nine branches achieved a mandate for strike action on pay and two also on pensions; strikes were scheduled at most branches for 28 February to 2 March 2022. The National Union of Students called a "student strike for education" on 2 March. Strike action ran as scheduled, without producing a change of position from UUK or UCEA.

Faced with the prospect of staff refusing to make up lost teaching following strikes, at least six universities threatened to deduct 100% of staff pay not only for days of strike action but also for subsequent days of action short of a strike. Queen Mary University was the most assertive of these institutions, provoking a new, local strike ballot.

With the Easter vacation drawing near, UCU ran further five-day strikes, on 21–25 March or 28 March–1 April, depending on the schedules of different universities, with striking Unison branches participating on selected days. An extensive petition by female professors expressed concern for the disproportionate effects on pension changes on women and the alleged lack of an equalities analysis of USS's actions.

With the six-month mandate for UCU strike action established in November 2021 expiring, UCU began a new ballot to enable continued industrial action in March 2022.

==== 22 February: USS 2020 valuation concludes ====
On 22 February 2022, the USS Joint Negotiating Committee (JNC) formally voted to conclude the 2020 valuation, with UUK succeeding in achieving most of its planned reforms to USS at the expense of UCU's, from 1 April that year:

	outcome	UUK August 2020 proposal	UCU August 2020 proposal
employer contribution	21.6%	21.1% (no change)	24.9% (3.8% rise)
employee contribution	9.8%	9.6% (no change)	8.1% (1.5% drop)
accrual rate (previously 1/75)	1/85	1/85	1/80
salary threshold up to which defined benefits accrue (previously £55,000)	£40,000	£40,000	£40,000
cap for inflation-proofing benefits (previously full protection up to 5% and half between 5% and 15%)	changes deferred 'until at least the next valuation'	2.5%	no change to cap (with costs of inflation over 2.5% borne by employers)
membership		no flexible option for members who wish to join USS and earn a guaranteed pension	members who spend over three months in USS entitled to the same benefits as everyone else.

USS was assured of the viability of UUK's position by UUK giving a £1.3 billion annual increase in covenant support, and agreement that if an employer exited the scheme it would have to pay an immediate and long-running moratorium. A USS report released at the end of March estimated growth in scheme assets from £66.5 billion at the close of March 2020 to £88.8 billion at the end of March 2022, and a fall in the scheme's deficit from £14.1 billion to £2 billion, which meant that no extra contributions would be required to service the scheme's estimated deficit. UCU seized on the report to argue that belt-tightening in the scheme should be reversed; USS argued that greater evidence for a positive trend was necessary; and UUK indicated that they would be willing to "reduce contributions or increase benefits or some combination of both" if the positive trend held at the next valuation. On 28 April, the University of Glasgow, in conjunction with the local UCU branch, announced its willingness to contribute more to USS, but other such progress was not in evidence.

==== 31 March: 2022–23 New JNCHES pay round begins ====
UCEA offered little, if any, commentary on the UCU strikes during this period, but spelled out its position at the end of March in its statutory statement on the 2022–23 New JNCHES pay negotiations. UCEA emphasised the financial challenges facing the sector and argued that it was making good progress on investing in staff and reducing casualisation, though not on addressing pay inequality. The report concluded by saying "we hope that we can engage in productive and constructive negotiations on a meaningful pay uplift recognising the real difficulty inflation poses for all parties. We are also committed to positively exploring other areas of the claim which fall within the New JNCHES remit". The Joint Trade Unions' claim, meanwhile, featured numerous desiderata, prominently including "a pay uplift that is, at least, inflation (RPI) plus 2%", "a minimum wage of £12 per hour for all", a 35-hour working week, "meaningful, agreed action to tackle the ethnic, gender and disability pay gap", "a framework to eliminate precarious employment practises and casualised contracts", and "a UK level higher education redeployment facility for those whose jobs are at risk of redundancy". RPI stood at 7% at the time.

At a meeting on 25 April 2022, UCEA initially offered a 2.75% pay increase (rising to 6% at the bottom of the pay scale), saying that this would add 2.9% to the national Higher Education pay bill; UCEA closed the meeting with an offer that would add 3.05% to the bill.

==== May – June: marking and assessment boycott ====
Following a new round of ballots for industrial action in March, on 11 April UCU announced that thirty-nine institutions had met the requirements to continue strike action on the Four Fights (forty-one for action short of strike action), and twenty-seven on USS. This represented the lowest level of support among union members since the disputes began in 2018. The union's general secretary promptly circulated a report entitled "A new strategy and plan of action for the Four Fights dispute", which argued that, in view of the relatively low level of branches with a mandate to strike, rather than taking immediate industrial action, UCU should be "calling for a continuation of our campaigning but pledging to build now for more effective future disputes involving the entire sector in 2023". However, the relevant decision-making body of UCU, the Special Higher Education Conference, attended by delegates from all branches on 20 April, opted for a policy whereby eligible branches would take action short of a strike, specifically including a marking and assessment boycott to coincide with the summer examination period, along with ten days of strike action. Delays followed, however, leading to the boycott beginning on 23 May, after most marking in some branches was complete for the year.

As of 20 May, it seemed that up to twenty-one branches were planning to implement the marking boycott, with decisions about whether and when to take strike action also devolved to branch level. Some UCU members reported concern that the Union's demands were too extensive or vague, and that too few branches were taking action for the industrial action to be effective. Around half of the affected universities threatened to deduct 100% of the pay of employees boycotting assessment, and some began contracting marking of student work to private companies. Individual UCU branches began striking local deals to end the boycott from around 20 May, when Durham's branch called off its boycott.

On 30 May, Bill Galvin, the chief executive of USS, acknowledged that the scheme was much healthier than the previous valuation had predicted and that if such trends persisted, following the March 2023 valuation, "it may be possible for the Joint Negotiating Committee [...] to consider increasing benefits or decreasing contributions (or some combination of both)". Shortly after, a UCU negotiator and two co-authors released a paper arguing that UUK had underestimated the likely losses of cuts to the USS scheme implemented in April 2022.

In response to the marking and assessment boycott, some platforms have emerged to assist students in claiming compensation for the disruptions caused. One such platform is Student-Claims, which provides guidance and support for students looking to claim compensation due to the marking boycott. The service aims to streamline the process of claiming compensation for affected students, offering a structured process for submitting claims.

Additionally, universities have set up compensation schemes for students affected by the industrial action. For instance, the University of Exeter introduced the Industrial Action Compensation Scheme to compensate students affected during the 2022/23 academic year, with the scheme accepting applications until 5 January 2024. Students are also advised to check with their respective universities for similar compensation schemes, or explore the possibility of claiming compensation independently.

=== September 2022 – March 2023: nationwide strikes ===
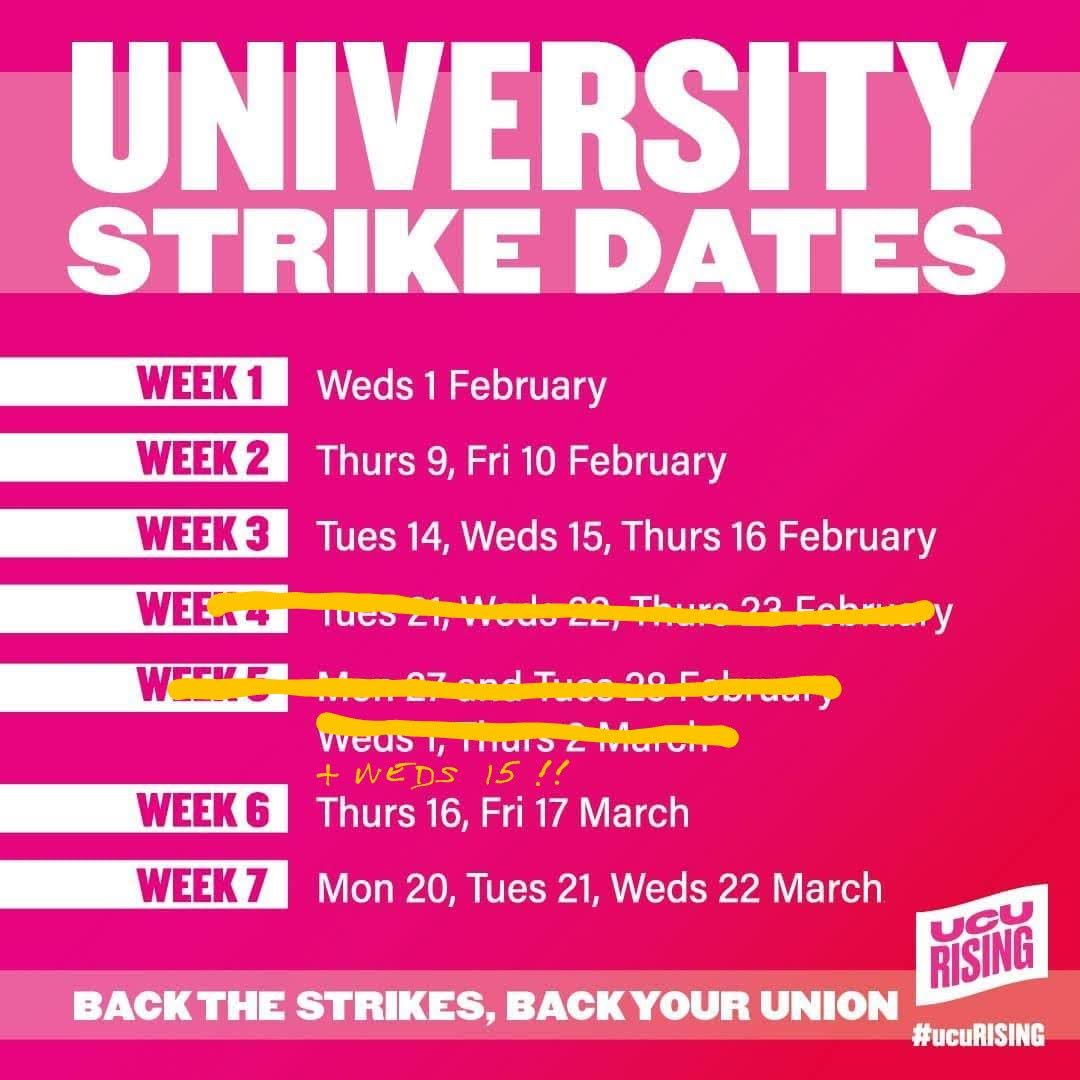
UCU strike dates February–March 2023, showing progressive amendments

After a series of unsuccessful attempts to cross the ballot turnout threshold for taking strike action, nine Unison branches had succeeded in voting for strike action in February 2022. A further ballot during summer 2022 raised the number to twenty, and these branches began strike action on days selected by local branches in September and October 2022. Meanwhile, UCU began a new ballot on 6 September. Unlike other ballots in the period 2018–22, this was nationally aggregated. Closing on 21 October, the ballot resulted in a mandate for strike action at all branches nationwide on the Four Fights, and at all branches participating in USS on pensions. Strikes took place 24, 25, and 30 November, at which time UCU and Unison were joined by ten branches of Unite; reports of the number of striking staff included 70,000 people at 150 institutions. As in previous disputes, UCU members undertook action short of a strike in the wake of strike action, for which some universities threatened 100% pay deductions, with QMUL and Wolverhampton noted in the press as foremost proponents of this approach. In 2023, UCU scheduled strikes for 1, 9–10, 14–16, 21–23 and 27–28 February, and 1–2, 16–17, and 20–22 March. Strikes at this time coincided with widespread industrial action in the UK across the public and transport sectors.

After six days of strike action in 2023, the joint unions paused the strike action "to allow our ongoing negotiations to continue in a constructive environment", citing progress in ongoing negotiations on both pensions and working conditions; the UCU general secretary Jo Grady nonetheless emphasised that industrial action had not ceased and that she sought a renewed mandate for industrial action. At this point, pay negotiations for 2023–24 were concluded with the implementation of the following pay offer, made by UCEA in January 2023:

Spinal Points 3–5	8%
Spinal Points 6–14	7%
Spinal Points 15–25	6%
Spinal Points 26–	5%

UCEA characterised the situation as an "impasse, rather than an agreement": vice-chancellors emphasised that higher payrises would be unaffordable by some institutions, whereas UCU's general secretary had previously characterised this as "a low-ball 5% offer", with RPI inflation standing at 13.4 per cent in December 2022; over 30,000 UCU members had voted on the offer in an online poll and 80% had rejected it in early February 2023. Yet, concerning the Four Fights, Grady suggested that the pay spine was itself being reviewed and would lose its lowest point; that "involuntary" zero-hours contracts might be abolished "on campus"; and that "time limited negotiations for new agreements" were in prospect to address casualisation, workloads, and equality pay-gaps. Meanwhile, concerning pensions, UCU and UUK issued an "interim joint statement" foreseeing that the March 2023 valuation of the pension would enable the restitution of benefits as they stood prior to April 2022, at reduced cost to both employers and employees; saying that "we agree on the urgent need, with the USS Trustee, to examine the case more fully for divestment from fossil fuels and that a greater visibility of climate crisis action and mitigation should be a feature of long-term USS planning"; and agreeing to improve the governance of the scheme to prevent recurrent disputes. Some UCU members expressed concern as to whether Grady calling a pause in the industrial action was consistent with UCU's democratic processes.

On 15 March—a strike day that UCU had added to their calendar of strikes—it was announced that negotiations with UUK promised the restoration of pension terms to be comparable with 2017 levels, while UCEA had offered to, in UCU's words, "agree new standards, frameworks and principles to tackle other forms of casualised contracts, reduce workloads and close equality pay gaps". UCU began consulting members on their preferred response, proposing that strike action should be called off while a formal consultation took place. This process proved highly controversial within the Union; the outcome of a UCU Higher Education Committee meeting on Friday 17 March was that no formal consultation of members was undertaken, and strike action continued to the end of the advertised period, 22 March.

=== April 2023 – September 2023: marking and assessment boycott ===
UCU went on to ballot members on whether to accept UUK and UCEA's offers; the results were announced 3 April 2023. With a 56.4% turnout, 85.6 members gave UCU a mandate until the end of September for strike action regarding the Four Fights; with a 58.4% turnout, 89% of members returned a mandate for action; the votes also gave a mandate for action short of a strike. Following further consultations with members and their representatives, on 17 April 2023, UCU, satisfied with progress, paused industrial action concerning pensions, but a marking and assessment boycott was declared with regard to the Four Fights dispute. These processes were the subject of considerable internal disputes within UCU. UCEA responded that it was impossible for a significant proportion of its members to afford a higher wage bill. Universities responded by threatening to deduct pay for staff participating in the boycott. On 28 May, it was reported that 30 universities had told staff that they would withhold 100% of pay; 43 threatened to withhold 50%–80%. These threats prompted localised strikes at at least twenty universities, including the calling of indefinite strikes at Leeds and Brighton in response to the prospect of 100% pay deductions. Universities adapted extraordinary measures pioneered in response to the COVID-19 pandemic in order to classify and award degrees based on an incomplete collection of marks, with approaches including the awarding of interim unclassified degrees. These steps attracted criticism on the grounds that they would make degree results less accurate, might for some kinds of degrees prevent students from meeting accreditation requirements of professional bodies, could affect international students' ability to meet visa requirements, and might lead to inequalities between students differently affected by the boycott. Some graduate employers prepared themselves to offer jobs based on adapted criteria, however, and, amidst considerable uncertainty, UCEA reported on 23 June that of universities that had responded to a survey, 71% thought that over 98% of their students would be able to graduate that summer. In what was seen as a sign of growing disarray among both employers and UCU branches, at the end of that month, Queen's University Belfast ended the boycott locally by agreeing a 2% "cost-of-living supplement"; the university's membership of UCEA was revoked shortly after.

The boycott persisted through the summer, and UCU threatened further strike action in September, for the beginning of the 2023–24 academic year. But reballoting for a new mandate for industrial action did not begin in time to avoid UCU's mandate for the boycott lapsing before industrial action could be renewed. With the end of its industrial mandate approaching, UCU called off the boycott on 6 September following a consultation of members in which 60% of respondents favoured dropping the boycott. UCU nonetheless declared further strike days (running at most universities 25–29 September 2023) and began balloting members for a renewed mandate for strike action; the ballot was to run 19 September to 3 November 2023.

=== Ballot failure and aftermath ===
The industrial action concluded in November 2023 after a ballot on extending action failed on turnout. The union was not successful in its Four Fights action, and universities across the country enacted a wave of mass layoffs which is ongoing as of 2026.

In 2024 a class action lawsuit was brought against University College London by Student Group Claim, a group representing thousands of students. The group argued that the lost teaching hours- from both the strikes and COVID-related disruption- led to them being eligible for compensation. The case was resolved out of court in February 2026, and the settlement remains confidential. The group indicated that it intended to follow the same process with other universities.

== Tables of UK higher education strikes 2018–20 ==
Britain-wide UCU voter turnout and support for strike action (original ballots only; for sources see next table)
academic year	total UK academic staff		ballot	electorate	turnout	turnout %	yes-votes	yes-votes % of votes	yes-votes % of electorate	number of branches striking
academic year	full-time	part-time	ballot	electorate	turnout	turnout %	yes-votes	yes-votes % of votes	yes-votes % of electorate	number of branches striking
2017-18	140725	71250	USS	42415	24707	58.3	22978	93	54.2	62
2019-20	146780	76745	USS	50071	28338	56.6	21034	74.2	42	43
2019-20	146780	76745	Four Fights	72011	35672	49.54	26226	73.5	36.4	54
2021 (November)	149085 (2020-21 figure)	75445 (2020-21 figure)	USS	50443	26858	53.24	20521	76.4	40.7	36
2021 (November)	149085 (2020-21 figure)	75445 (2020-21 figure)	Four Fights	71060	35956	50.6	25213	70.1	35.5	59
2022 (April)	149085 (2020-21 figure)	75445 (2020-21 figure)	USS	48641	24284	50	19294	79	40	27
2022 (April)	149085 (2020-21 figure)	75445 (2020-21 figure)	Four Fights	68953	31944	46.3	23636	74	34.3	41
2022 (October)	149085 (2020-21 figure)	75445 (2020-21 figure)	USS			60.2		84.9		all
2022 (October)	149085 (2020-21 figure)	75445 (2020-21 figure)	Four Fights	65996	38088	57.7	31378	81.1	57.7	all
2023 (March)	149085 (2020-21 figure)	75445 (2020-21 figure)	USS	51328	29924	58.4	26561	89.1	51.7	all
2023 (March)	149085 (2020-21 figure)	75445 (2020-21 figure)	Four Fights	70957	40028	56.4	34199	85.7	48.2	all

Participation by individual universities in strikes
	2018	2019–20 (r=reballot)		November 2021 – April 2022 (r=reballot)			April 2022		September 2022	2018–21
	USS	USS	Four Fights (UCU)	USS	Four Fights (UCU)	Four Fights (Unison)	USS	Four Fights (UCU)	Four Fights (Unison)	Local disputes
Aberdeen, university of	×	×								
Aberystwyth University	×									
Aston University	×	×	×	×	×					
Bangor University	×	×	×							
Bath, university of	×	×	×	×						
Bath Spa University			×r						×	
Birkbeck College, University of London	×	×r	×r	×	×	×	×	×	×	
Birmingham, university of		×	×	×	×					2019: Caterers, cleaners, and security guards in Unison to secure a local pay increase of 4.85% for the lowest-paid, scaling to 3% for the highest paid.
Bishop Grosseteste University			×		×					
Bournemouth University			×		×			×		
Bradford, university of	×	×	×	×	×					
Brighton, university of			×		×	×		×	×	
Bristol, university of	×	×	×	×	×				×	
Brunel University	×									
Cambridge, university of	×	×	×	×	×					
Cardiff University	×	×	×				×	×		
Central Lancashire, university of					×					
Chester, university of					×			×		
City, University of London	×	×	×	×r	×r	×			×	
Courtauld Institute of Art	×	×	×	×r	×		×	×		
Cranfield University	×									
De Montfort University			×r							
Dundee, university of	×	×	×	×	×		×	×		
Durham University	×	×	×	×	×		×	×		
East Anglia, university of	×	×	×r							
East London, university of			×r							
Edge Hill University			×							
Edinburgh Napier University					×	×		×	×	
Edinburgh, university of	×	×	×	×	×		×	×		
Essex, university of	×	×	×	×	×		×	×		
Exeter, university of	×	×	×				×	×		
Glasgow Caledonian University			×						×	
Glasgow School of Art			×		×					
Glasgow, university of	×	×	×	×	×		×	×	×	
Gloucestershire University						×				
Goldsmiths, University of London	×	×	×	×	×		×	×		Strikes against redundancies 2021–22.
Greenwich, university of			×r		×			×		
Heriot-Watt University	×	×	×	×	×		×	×		
Huddersfield, university of			×r							
Hull, university of	×									
Imperial College London	×	×r								
Institute for Development Studies		×		×			×			
Institute of Education	×									
Keele University	×	×r		×	×		×	×		
Kent, university of	×		×	×	×					
King's College London	×	×r		×	×	×	×	×	×	
Kingston University					×			×		
Lancaster, university of	×	×	×	×	×					
Leeds Beckett University									×	
Leeds Trinity University			×r		×					
Leeds, university of	×	×	×	×	×	×	×	×	×	
Leicester, university of	×	×	×	×r	×					2021: UCU staff regarding redundancies.
Liverpool Hope University			×		×				×	
Liverpool Institute of Performing Arts			×		×			×		
Liverpool School of Tropical Medicine	×									
Liverpool, university of	×	×	×	×	×		×	×		2021: UCU staff regarding redundancies.
London, university of										2018: cleaners, porters, and receptionists to get their work insourced.
London School of Economics	?			×	×					
London School of Hygiene and Tropical Medicine	×			×	×					
London South Bank University									×	
Loughborough University	×	×	×	×	×		×	×		
Manchester Metropolitan University					×				×	
Manchester, university of	×	×	×		×					2020: student rent strike.
Newcastle University	×	×	×	×r	×r		×	×		
Northampton, university of					×			×		
Northumbria University					×r					
Nottingham, university of	×	×	×	×	×		×	×		
Open University	×	×	×	×	×					
Oxford Brookes University					×r					
Oxford, university of	×	×r	×							
Queen Margaret University, Edinburgh			×		×	×		×		
Queen Mary, University of London	×	×	×	×r	×r		×	×		2021: student rent strike.
Queen's University Belfast	×	×	×	×	×		×	×		
Reading, university of	×	×	×	×						
Robert Gordon University									×	
Roehampton University			×		×					
Royal College of Art			×r		×			×		
Royal Holloway, University of London	×	×	×	×	×					
Royal Northern College of Music					×			×		
Royal Veterinary College, University of London	×									
Ruskin College	?									
Salford, university of	×				×					
Scottish Association for Marine Science at University of the Highlands and Islands	×	×								
Senate House, University of London	×									
Sheffield Hallam University			×		×			×		
Sheffield, university of	×	×	×	×	×		×	×		
SOAS, University of London	×	×r	×r	×	×	×	×	×	×	
Southampton, university of	×	×	×				×	×		
St Andrews, university of	×	×	×	×	×		×	×		
St George's, University of London	?									
St Mary's University College, Belfast			×							
Stirling, university of	×	×	×	×	×					
Strathclyde, university of	×	×	×	×r						
Surrey, university of	×									
Sussex, university of	×	×	×	×	×		×	×		
Suffolk, university	?									
Swansea University	?			×r	×r					
Trinity Laban, London						×				
UAL London College of Arts			×r					×		
UCA - University for the Creative Arts					×r			×		
Ulster University	×	×	×	×	×		×	×		
University College London	×	×	×		×					2019: cleaners winning insourcing.
University of the Arts					×					
University of the West of England									×	
Wales, university of	×	×	×							
Warwick, university of	×	×	×							
Westminster, university of					×r			×		
Winchester, university of			×r		×					
Writtle University College					×r					
York, university of	×	×	×	×	×					

== See also ==
- 2013 United Kingdom higher education strike
