= Rector (academia) =

Academic official

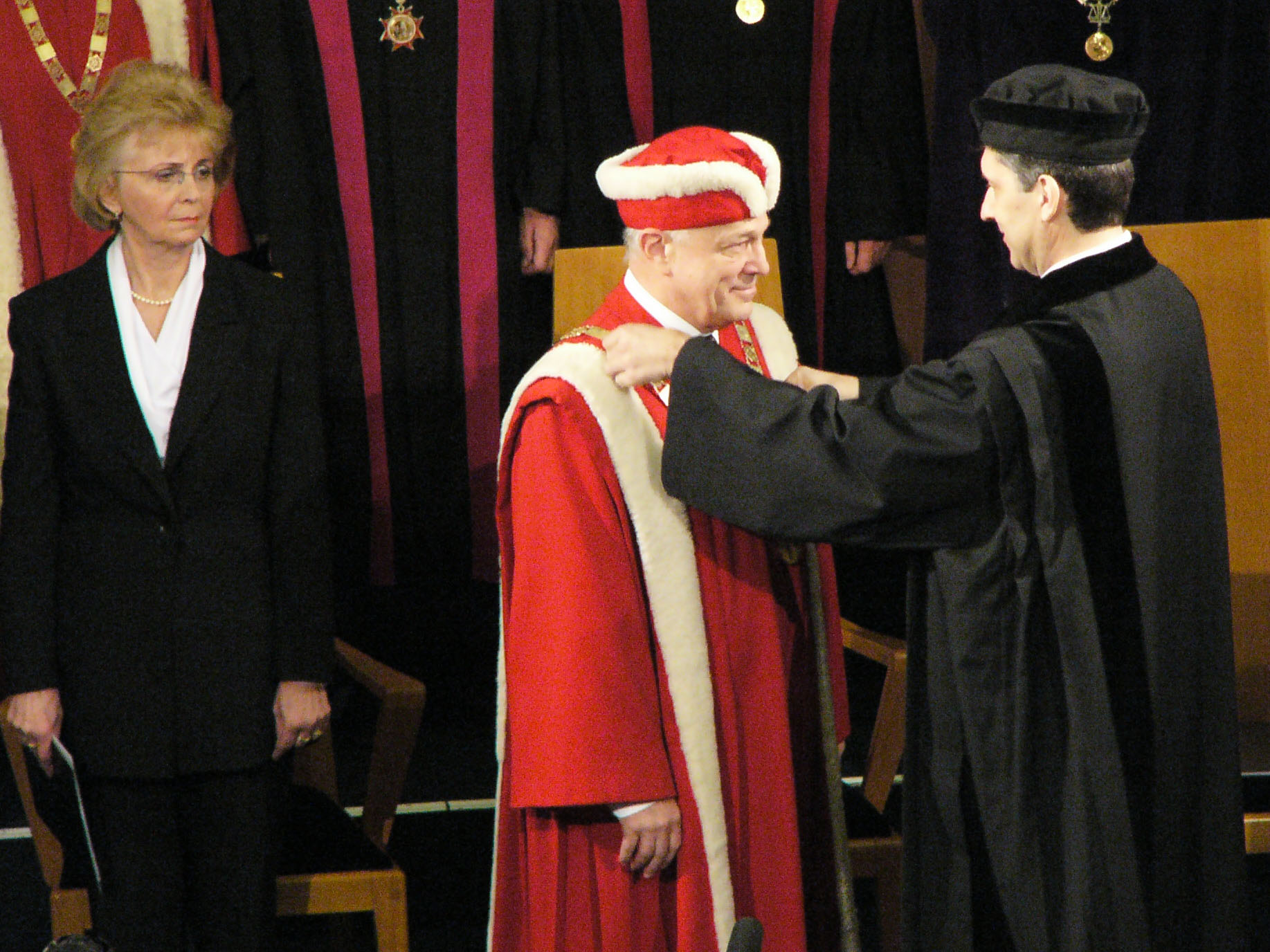
Inauguration of Rector Lubomír Dvořák (Palacký University), 2006

A rector (Latin for "ruler") is a senior official in an educational institution, and can be an official in either a university or a secondary school. Outside the English-speaking world, the rector is often the most senior official in a university, while in the United States, the highest-ranking officer within a university's academic administration is often referred to as a chancellor or president. In the United Kingdom and Commonwealth of Nations, a university's chief executive is called vice-chancellor. The term and office of a rector can be referred to as a rectorate.

The title is used widely in universities in Europe (Note: European nations where the word rector or a cognate thereof (rektor, recteur, etc.) is used in referring to university administrators include Albania, Austria, the Benelux, Bosnia and Herzegovina, Bulgaria, Croatia, Cyprus, Czech Republic, Denmark, Estonia, Finland, Germany, Greece, Hungary, Iceland, Italy, Kazakhstan, Latvia, Malta, Moldova, North Macedonia, Poland, Portugal, Romania, Russia, Scandinavia, Scotland, Serbia, Slovenia, Slovakia, Spain, Turkey and Ukraine.) and is very common in Latin American countries. (Note: Rector is used for university administrators in Latin American nations such as: Argentina, Bolivia, Brazil, Chile, Colombia, Paraguay, Puerto Rico, Cuba, Dominican Republic, Guatemala, Mexico, Peru and Venezuela.) It is also used in Brunei, Macau, Pakistan, the Philippines, Indonesia, Israel and the Middle East. In the ancient universities of Scotland, the rector, elected by students (and staff at Edinburgh), is formally the third most senior officer of the university and has been historically responsible for chairing the university court.

== Europe ==
=== Austria ===
In a few "Crown lands" of the Austrian Empire, one seat in federal state parliaments was reserved for the rector of the capital's university, notably: Graz in Styria, Innsbruck in Tyrol, and Vienna; in Bohemia, two rectors had seats in the equivalent state diet.

Today, Austrian universities are headed from the rectorate (or vice-chancellor's office). This consists of a rector (vice-chancellor), who is elected by the university council, and 3-5 additional vice-rectors (pro-vice-chancellors). The rector is the CEO of the university.

=== Belgium ===
The head of Belgian universities is called a president, recteur (French-speaking universities), rector (Dutch-speaking universities), previously rector magnificus (men) or rectrix magnifica (women).

=== Czech Republic ===
The heads of Czech universities are called the rektor. The rector acts in the name of the university and decides the university's affairs unless prohibited by law. The rector is nominated by the University Academic Senate and appointed by the President of the Czech Republic. The nomination must be agreed by a simple majority of all senators, while a dismissal must be agreed by at least three fifths of all senators. The vote to elect or repeal a rector is secret. The term of office is four years and a person may hold it for at most two consecutive terms.

The rector appoints vice-rectors (pro-rektor), who act as deputies to the extent determined by the Rector. Rectors' salaries are determined directly by the Minister of Education.

Among the most important rectors of Czech universities were reformer Jan Hus, physician Jan Jesenius, theologian Rodrigo de Arriaga and representative of Enlightenment Josef Vratislav Monse. Jiřina Popelová (Palacký University of Olomouc) became the first female Rector in 1950.

The rectors are addressed "Your Magnificence Rector" ("Vaše Magnificence pane rektore").

=== Denmark ===
In Danish, rektor is the title used in referring to the heads of universities, gymnasiums, schools of commerce and construction, etc. Generally rektor may be used for the head of any educational institution above the primary school level, where the head is commonly referred to as a 'skoleinspektør' (Headmaster; Inspector of the school). In universities, the second-ranked official of governance is known as prorektor.

=== Finland ===
In Finland, the head of a primary school or secondary schools is called a rector (rehtori) provided the school is of sufficient size in terms of faculty and students, otherwise the title is headmaster (koulunjohtaja). The head of some Finnish universities is called chancellor (kansleri).

=== Germany ===
The head of a German university is called either Rektor (rector) or Präsident (president). The difference is usually that a Rektor is elected by the Senate from among the professors of the university (which is the traditional method of choosing the head of a German university), while a Präsident need be neither a professor nor a member of the university (or of any university) prior to appointment. The Rektor is traditionally addressed as Magnifizenz. The rector forms a collegiate leadership body together with the pro-rectors (Prorektor) and the university's chancellor (Kanzler) - collectively the rectorate (Rektorat). The rectorate is usually aided by several advisors (Referent) who provide advice on specific topics and take over responsibilities in the preparation of decisions, roughly comparable to an associate Pro-Vice-Chancellor in the British academic system.

Rektor is also the official title of the principal/headmaster of an elementary school; the deputies are called Konrektor. In earlier times, the title Rektor was also used for the head of a Gymnasium. Today, these teachers usually hold the title of Oberstudiendirektor ("Senior Director of Studies").

=== Iceland ===
The rektor is term used for the headmaster or headmistress of Icelandic universities and of some gymnasia.

=== Italy ===
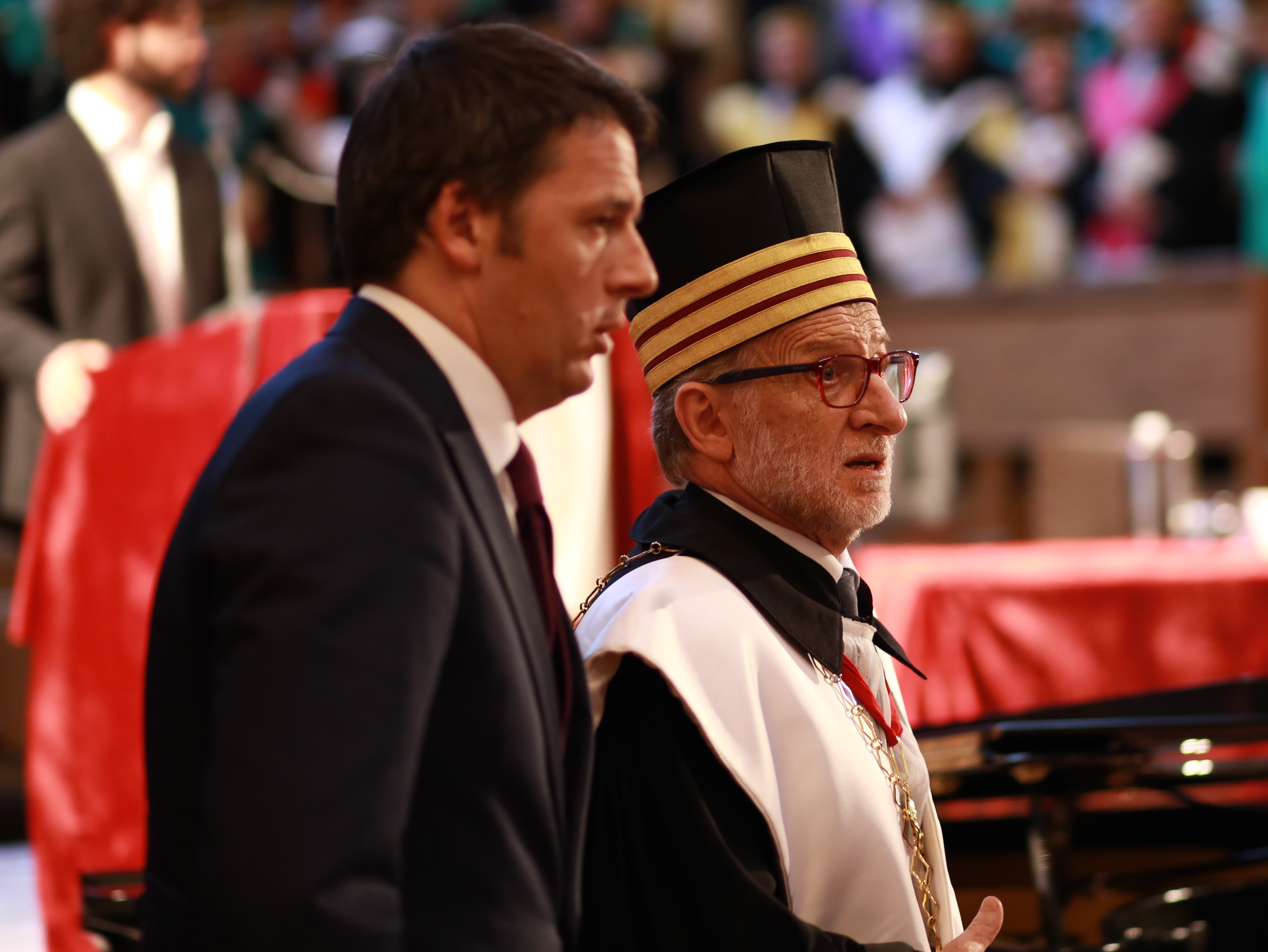
Then Rector of the Bologna University, Ivano Dionigi, with then Prime Minister of Italy Matteo Renzi, 2015.

In Italy the rector is the head of the university and Rappresentante Legale (legal representative) of the university. The rector is elected by an electoral body composed of all Professori ordinari ed associati (full and associate professors), the two highest ranks of the Italian university faculty, all the Ricercatori (lowest rank of departments) and representatives of the staff, students and PhD students.

The rector can appoint one pro-rettore vicario (acting as the vice-rector) and other pro-rettori with specific fields of competence, for instance education, international cooperation, equal opportunities, research.

The term of a rettore is now six years, in accordance with the new national regulation and the statuto (constitution of the university).

The Rettore is styled and formally greeted as Magnifico Rettore (Magnificent Rector).

=== Kazakhstan ===
A rector (ректор, rektor) in Kazakhstan is the chief executive and legal head of a university or other higher‑education institution. The rector oversees academic, administrative, and financial management and typically chairs the institution's collegial governing body, such as an Academic Council, though exact governance structures depend on each university's charter.

Rector positions are regulated under national legislation, including Article 44 of the Law on Education of the Republic of Kazakhstan, and institutional statutes. Public university rectors are generally nominated by a university board or academic council and approved by the relevant governmental authority, with procedural details set by each institution's internal rules.

Because higher‑education institutions enjoy institutional autonomy, the powers, governance role, and tenure of rectors can vary between universities. In 2024, policy reforms by the Ministry of Science and Higher Education limited rectors to a maximum of two consecutive three-year terms (six years total), whereas previously terms and reappointments were set by individual university charters, with some rectors serving 10–15 years or more.

Under their authority, rectors may appoint vice‑rectors to oversee specific areas such as academic programs, research, or administration. Rectors also act as the legal representative of the institution and interact with state authorities, other institutions, and external organizations.

=== Netherlands ===
In the Netherlands, the rector is the principal of a high school. The rector is supported by conrectors (deputy rectors who can take his place).

In Dutch universities, the Rector Magnificus is responsible for the scientific vision and quality of the university. The rector magnificus is one of the members of the executive board of a university. The rector magnificus is a full professor. The ceremonial responsibilities of the rector magnificus are to open the academic year, and to preside over the ceremonial PhD defenses and inaugural lectures of newly appointed (full) professors. During PhD defenses the rector is usually replaced by another full professor who is acting rector during the session.

=== Norway ===
A rector (Norwegian: rektor), in the context of academia, is the democratically elected head of a university or university college. The rector is the highest official of the university, and is traditionally elected among the institution's professorship, originally by all the (full) professors and in modern times by all academic employees, the students and the non-academic employees. The rector is traditionally the head of the Collegium Academicum, which has been renamed the university board in the 2000s, and is also the university's chief executive and ceremonial head. The elected deputy of the rector is known as pro-rector (Norwegian: prorektor). Some institutions also have vice rectors, who are appointed by the rector and subordinate to the rector and pro-rector.

Traditionally, Norwegian universities and colleges had democratic elections for the rector and pro-rector positions. Since 2016, the institutions may choose to have an elected or an appointed rector. Universities and colleges usually have a university director or college director, who is the head of the administration (i.e., the non-academic employees) and subordinate to the rectorate.

=== Poland ===
In Poland, the rector (Polish: rektor) serves as the elected head of a university or university college. In military and military-type higher education institutions, the equivalent position is referred to as commander (Polish: komendant). The rector is the highest official of the university. Rector of the university can be a person with at least a doctoral degree, employed by the university as the main place of work. Rector is referred to as Jego/Jej Magnificencja (en. His/Her Magnificence) (abbreviation: JM). The outfit of rector is red or purple coat (robe) with ermine fur, often with a scepter and a decorative string of symbols of the university. Deputy rectors (Polish: prorektor) at official ceremonies are dressed in the same gown, but with fewer decorations (usually without the fur). Rectors of military universities wear only an officer's uniform and a necklace with symbols of the university.

As of 2008, the term of office of the rector of public universities lasts for four years (previously three years), beginning on 1 September in an election year and ending on 31 August of the year in which the term ends. A person may not be elected to serve as rector for more than two consecutive terms. In the case of private universities the rule is regulated by university statute.

=== Portugal ===
In Portugal, the Rector (Portuguese: Reitor male or Reitora female), frequently addressed as Magnificent Rector (Magnífico Reitor in Portuguese), is the elected highest official of each university, governing and representing the university. Those universities whose foundation has been historically approved by the Pope, as e.g. the rector of the University of Coimbra, the oldest Portuguese university, is referred to as Magnífico Reitor (Rector's name) ("Rector Magnificus (Rector's Name)"). The others are referred to as Excelentíssimo Senhor Reitor. The rector of a university is helped by vice-rectors and by pro-rectors, with different responsibilities. Until 1974, the director of each lyceum (high school) also had the title of Rector.

=== Russia ===
In Russia, the rector (Russian: Ректор) as a term for a university chancellor introduced in 1961. Before 1961 university chancellor had title "director" (Russian: Директор).

=== Spain ===
In Spain, all Rectors must be addressed as Señor Rector Magnífico according to the law (Ley Orgánica 4/2007), but the Rector of the University of Salamanca, the oldest on the Iberian Peninsula, is usually styled according to academic protocol as Excelentísimo e Ilustrísimo Señor Profesor Doctor Don (Rector's name), Rector Magnífico de la Universidad de Salamanca ("The Most Excellent and Most Illustrious Lord Professor Doctor Don (Rector's name), Rector Magnificus of the University of Salamanca").

In Spain, Rector or Rector Magnífico (magnific rector, from Latin Rector Magnificus) is the highest administrative and educational office in a university, equivalent to that of president or chancellor of an English-speaking university but holding all the powers of a vice-chancellor; they are thus the head of the academy at universities. Formally styled as Excelentísimo e Ilustrísimo Señor Profesor Doctor Don N, Rector Magnífico de la Universidad de X ("Most Excellent and Illustrious Lord Professor Doctor Don N, Rector Magnificus of the University of X"), it is an office of high dignity within Spanish society, usually being highly respected. It is not strange to see them appear in the media, especially when some academic-related subject is being discussed and their opinion is requested.

Spanish rectors are chosen from within the body of university full professors (Catedráticos in Spanish); it is compulsory for anyone aspiring to become a rector to have been a doctor for at least six years before his election, and to have achieved professor status, holding it in the same university for which he is running. Usually, when running for election, the rector will need to have chosen the vice-rectors (vicerrectores in Spanish), who will occupy several sub-offices in the university. Rectors are elected directly by free and secret universal suffrage of all the members of the university, including students, lecturers, readers, researchers, and civil servants. However, the weight of the vote in each academic sector is different: the total student vote usually represents 20% of the whole, no matter how many students there are; the votes of the entire group made up of professors and readers (members of what used to be known as the Claustro (cloister)) usually count for about 40-50% of the total; lecturers, researchers (including Ph.D. students and others) and non-doctoral teachers, about 20% of the total; and the remainder (usually some 5-10%) is left for non-scholarly workers (people in administration, etc.) in the university. Spanish law allows those percentages to be changed according to the situation of each university, or even not to have a direct election system. Indeed, in a few universities the Rector is chosen indirectly; the members of the modern Claustro (a sort of electoral college or parliament in which all the above-mentioned groups are represented) is chosen first, and then the Claustro selects the Rector.

Rectors hold their office for four years before another election is held, and there is no limit to the number of re-election terms. However, only the most charismatic and respected rectors have been able to hold their office for more than two or three terms. Of those, some have been notable Spanish scholars, such as Basque writer Miguel de Unamuno, Rector of the University of Salamanca from 1901 until 1936.

=== Sweden ===
Rektor is the title for the highest-ranked administrative and educational leader for an academic institution, such as a primary school, secondary school, private school, high school, college or university. The rektors of state-run colleges and universities are formally appointed by the government, i.e. the cabinet, but upon the advice of the concerned institution's board, and usually following some sort of democratic process at the concerned institution. The adjunct of a rektor at a university is called a prorektor and is appointed by the institution's board. Some institutions also have vicerektorer (vice rectors), who are appointed by the rektor to carry out a sub-set of the rektor's tasks. A vicerektor is subordinate to the rektor and prorektor.

In the older universities, Uppsala university and Lund university, the rektor is titled rector magnificus (men), or rectrix magnifica (women). Younger universities have in more recent years started using the Latin honorary title in formal situations, such as in honorary speeches or graduation ceremonies.

The University Chancellor of Sweden was until 2017 the title of the head of the government accrediting agency, the National Agency for Higher Education. From 2017, this position carries the title Director General which is the usual title of the head of a government agency. The people recruited to the position have in later times always been former rektors of a Swedish university. The position does not include leadership of a university.

Universities and colleges usually have a Universitetsdirektör or Förvaltningschef, who is the head of the administration (i.e., the non-academic employees) and subordinate to the rectorate.

=== Switzerland ===
The heads of the universities in Switzerland, usually elected by the college of professors, are titled rector (Rektor, recteur).

=== Turkey ===
According to the latest version of the Law on Higher Education (no. 2547), the heads of the universities in Turkey are titled as rectors (rektör) and are appointed by the president of Turkey.

The first instance of the seat of rectorship appeared in 1933, as a result of the university reform in Turkey. The rectorship of Istanbul University was appointed by decree in 1934, with the suggestion of the minister of education. The rector had also served as the representative of the minister.

With the Universities' Law of 1946, the rector had been directly elected from the professors with the votes of professors and ordinarius professors only. The rector could serve for two terms at most, and if the term had ended could not be re-elected. The new law with the same name in 1973 had removed the permanent election ban, however introduced that the rector could not serve more than two consecutive terms.

In 1981, as a result of the coup in the preceding year, rectors had started to be only appointed by the president of Turkey. The procedure was initially outlined in the first version of the Law no. 2547 and later in the Article 130 of the Constitution of Turkey (adopted in 1982).

Between 1992 and 2016, rectors in Turkey had been indirectly elected and ultimately were appointed into the office under a three-round system:

- In the first round, an election between the faculty members used to take place and six candidates were elected.
- Three of the initial candidates were elected by the Council of Higher Education members in the second round.
- Finally, the president of Turkey had appointed one of the three candidates presented by the Council.

As a result of the change made by the decree-law no. 767, the first round of the election was cancelled in 2016. However, the reports about delayed rector appointments emerged soon. The second round involving the Council was cancelled in 2018, by the decree-law no. 703. As a result of this change, the president of Turkey is the only competent authority in vetting and appointing the rectors.

=== United Kingdom ===
==== England ====
In England, most universities are led by a chancellor (a ceremonial position) and a vice-chancellor (the academic head). Where the title of 'rector' is used for a substantive position, it has normally been for the leaders of non-university institutions such as university colleges, polytechnics and colleges of higher education, or for heads of college at colleges in federal or collegiate universities.

At Liverpool Hope University, the academic head of the university has the title of "vice-chancellor and rector". Prior to the institution becoming a university in 2005, the head of Liverpool Hope University College was titled "rector". The title is also used at the University of Oxford by the heads of college at Lincoln College and Exeter College. The head of Mater Ecclesiae College, the Pontifical faculty within St Mary's University, Twickenham, also uses the title of rector.

The title of rector is also used for the ceremonial head (normally titled chancellor at British universities) of Brunel University London and City St George's, University of London. In the case of City St George's, this dates from City University giving up its university status to join the University of London in 2016, leading to the chancellor being renamed the rector. Brunel similarly adopted the title after joining the University of London in 2024. Their last chancellor retired in 2023 and their successor as ceremonial head was appointed as rector in 2025. At Durham University, the titular and religious head of St Chad's College is the rector (a position held ex officio by the Dean of Durham Cathedral), while the academic head is the principal.

Historically, the head of Imperial College London was called the rector, until this was split into a provost and "president and rector" in 2012. In 2014, Alice Gast was announced as simply president, replacing Keith O'Nions who had been "president and rector". An amendment to the university's statutes in November 2014 formally replaced the title of rector with that of president. Prior to their conversion to universities, some polytechnics had a rector as the head of the establishment; following their transition to universities, the position of rector was retitled as vice-chancellor. Polytechnics using this title included Central London, East London, Huddersfield, Liverpool and Sunderland. Some colleges of higher education, such as Nene College of Higher Education, also used the title of rector prior to becoming universities. King's College, Newcastle, the Newcastle division of the then-federal University of Durham, was led by a rector from its establishment in 1937 until it became Newcastle University in 1963, when the rector of the college became the vice-chancellor of the new university. The position of vice-chancellor of the federal university alternated between the rector of King's College (as vice-chancellor and rector) and the warden of the Durham colleges, the head of the Durham division (as vice-chancellor and warden). At the University of Cambridge, the officers now known as proctors were originally (in the 13th century) called rectors.

==== Scotland ====
===== Ancient universities =====
In Scotland, the position of rector exists in the four ancient universities (St Andrews, Glasgow, Aberdeen and Edinburgh) as well as at Dundee, which took its governance systems from its early connections to the University of St Andrews.

The current office of rector, sometimes termed lord rector, was instituted by the Universities (Scotland) Act 1858, passed by the Parliament of the United Kingdom. With the Universities (Scotland) Act 1889 requiring an election for the rector every three years in the ancient universities. The rector is the third-ranking official of university governance and is elected every three years by matriculated students at Aberdeen, Dundee, Glasgow and St Andrews, and by both the students and the staff at Edinburgh. Until the Higher Education Governance (Scotland) Act 2016 came into force, the rector chaired meetings of the university court, the governing body of the university; since 2016 the rector only opens and closes court meetings with the senior lay member chairing the business of the meeting.

The titular head of an ancient university in Scotland is the chancellor, who appoints a vice-chancellor to deputise in the awarding of degrees. The principal of each university is, by convention, appointed as vice-chancellor, however the position of vice-chancellor does not confer any other powers or responsibility on the principal. The authority to serve as chief executive of each university is vested in the office of principal, who holds both offices referred to as principal and vice-chancellor.

One of the main functions of the rector is to represent the interests of the student body. To some extent the office of rector has evolved into more of a figurehead role, with a significant number of celebrities and personalities elected as rectors, such as Stephen Fry and Lorraine Kelly at Dundee, Clarissa Dickson Wright at Aberdeen, and John Cleese and Frank Muir at St Andrews, and political figures, such as Mordechai Vanunu at Glasgow. In many cases, particularly with high-profile rectors, attendance at the university court in person is rare; the rector nominates an individual (normally a member of the student body) with the title of rector's assessor, who sits as a voting member of the university court.

Gordon Brown, the former Prime Minister of the United Kingdom, was rector of the University of Edinburgh while a student there but since then most universities have amended their procedures to disqualify currently matriculated students from standing for election.

As of April 2025, the rector of the University of Aberdeen is Iona Fyfe, a Scottish folk singer; the rector of the University of Dundee is arts consultant Keith Harris; the rector of the University of Edinburgh is Simon Fanshawe; the rector of the University of Glasgow is Ghassan Abu-Sittah; and the rector of the University of St Andrews is Stella Maris.

===== High schools =====
Some Scottish high schools and secondary schools have a head teacher whose official title is rector, an example being Bell Baxter High School in Cupar, Fife.

=== Central and Eastern Europe ===
The rector is the head of most universities and other higher educational institutions in at least parts of Central and Eastern Europe, such as Bulgaria, Bosnia and Herzegovina, Croatia, Romania, North Macedonia, Serbia, Slovakia, Slovenia, Hungary and Ukraine. The rector's deputies are known as "pro-rectors". Individual departments of a university (called faculties) are headed by deans.

== North America ==
=== Canada ===
Quebec's francophone universities such as the Université de Montréal and Université Laval use the term (recteur or rectrice in French) to designate the head of the institution.

As in most Commonwealth and British-influenced countries, the term "rector" is not commonly used in English in Canada outside Quebec. At the bilingual University of Ottawa, in Ontario the term president is used in English while recteur (or rectrice) continues is the French term for the head of the university. In addition, the historically French-Catholic, and now bilingual, Saint Paul University, also in Ottawa, uses the term to denote its head.

At the University of Manitoba, affiliates such as the Roman Catholic St. Paul's College and the French language Université de Saint-Boniface also uses the term 'rector' to designate the head of those institutions.

The rector of Queen's University in Kingston, Ontario is a member of the student body elected to work as an equal with the chancellor and principal. The badge of office of the rector of Queen's University was registered with the Canadian Heraldic Authority on 15 October 2004.

=== Mexico ===
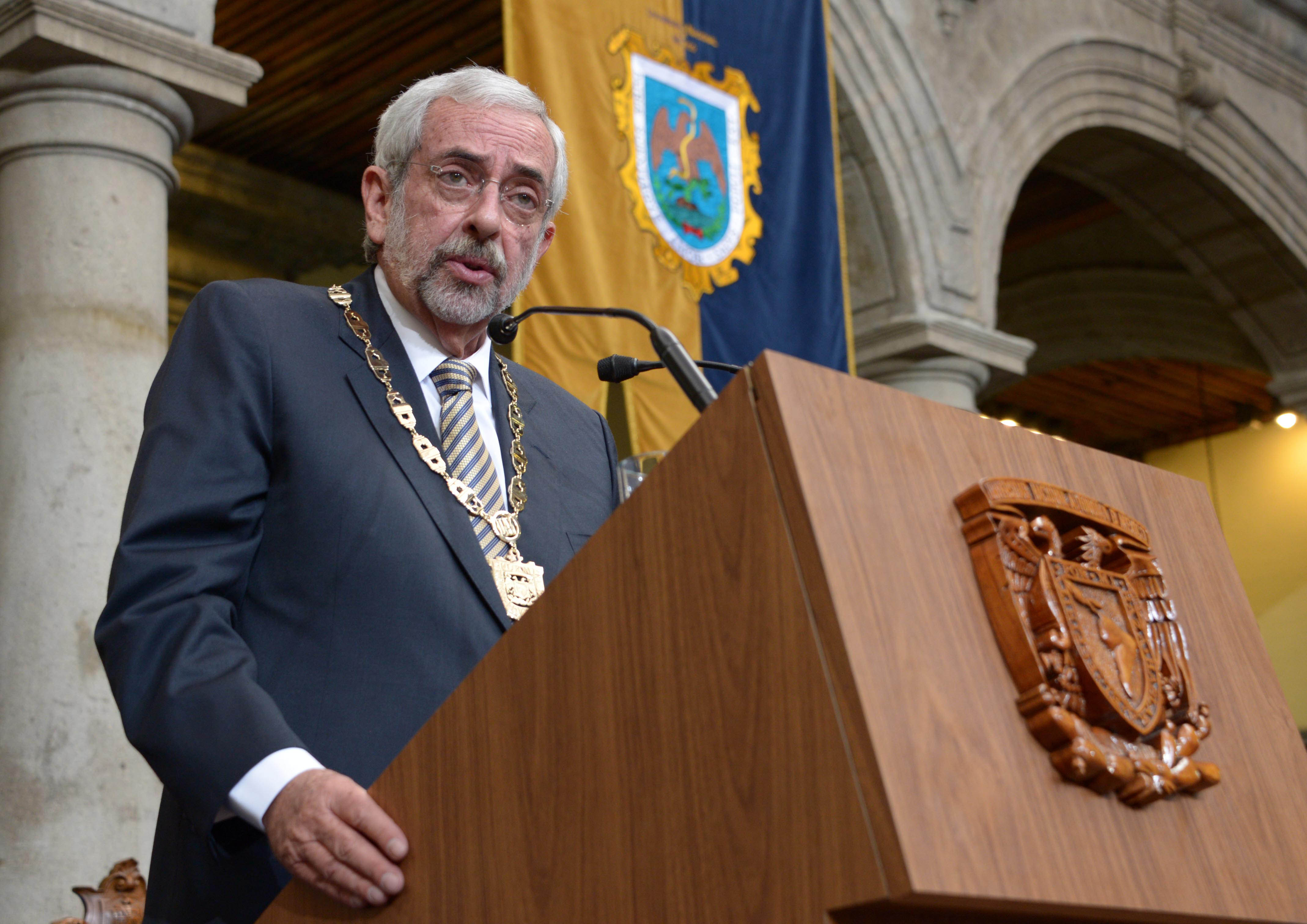
Enrique Graue 34th Rector of the UNAM during his inaugural speech, 2015

In Mexico, the term "rector" refers to the highest authority of most of National and State Universities, it is also usual in private Universities. The Schools and Faculties (Facultades in Spanish) are in charge of Directors which are below the authority of the rector. The rector is often selected from the full time professors and have periods which vary in the different universities.

The rector of the National Autonomous University of Mexico, the most relevant Mexican university, is an important mediatic figure of academic authority for all the country. The political relevance of the university makes the rector office one disputed political position and the ex-rectors are often related with the public service after their appointment, for example, Juan Ramón de la Fuente rector from 1999 to 2007 was Permanent Representative of Mexico to the United Nations between 2018 and 2024, and since then is Minister for Foreign Affairs in the government of Claudia Sheinbaum. Similarly, José Narro Robles rector from 2007 to 2015 was after head of the Ministry of Health. From 2015 to 2023 the office of rector on the UNAM was occupied by Enrique Graue Wiechers.

=== United States ===
Most US colleges do not use the term "rector." The terms "president" and "chancellor" are often used for the chief executive of universities and university systems, depending on the institution's statutes or governing documents. Some state university systems have both "presidents" of the constituent institutions and a "chancellor" of the overall system, or vice versa; for example, in the University of California system, each of the ten campuses is headed by a chancellor, while the leader of the system is given the title "president." Colleges and universities, or state systems, also typically have governing boards (akin to a board of directors), which may be referred to by a variety of names, including "board of trustees" and "board of regents", and which are usually led by a chairperson.

"Rector" is commonly used in Virginia, however. The University of Virginia, University of Mary Washington, George Mason University, Virginia State University, Virginia Commonwealth University, Longwood University, Washington and Lee University, the College of William and Mary, Old Dominion University, Christopher Newport University, and Virginia Tech all use the term "Rector" to designate the presiding officer of the Board of Visitors or "Board of Trustees", in the case of Washington and Lee. Thomas Jefferson served as the first rector of the University of Virginia, beginning in 1819, and intended that the school would not have a president; it lacked that position until 1904.

From 1701 to 1745, the head of the school that was to become Yale University was termed the "rector". As head of Yale College, Thomas Clap was both the last to be called "rector" (1740–1745) and the first to be referred to as president (1745–1766). Modern custom omits the use of the term "rector" and identifies Abraham Pierson as the first Yale president (1701–1707), making Clap the fifth of Yale's leaders, regardless of title.

Several Catholic colleges and universities, particularly those run by religious orders of priests (such as the Jesuits) used to employ the term "rector" to refer to the school's chief officer. In many cases, the rector was also the head of the community of priests assigned to the school, so the two posts – head of the university and local superior of the priests – were merged in the role of rector (See "Ecclesiastical rectors"). This practice is mostly no longer followed, as the details of the governance of most of these schools have changed. Creighton University still appoints a rector. At the University of Notre Dame, the title "rector" is used for those in charge of individual residence halls.

Some American high schools also have a rector; for example, at St. Paul's School in New Hampshire, the rector is equivalent to a headmaster or head of the school.

== Oceania ==
=== Australia ===
The term "rector" is uncommon in Australian academic institutions. The executive head of an Australian university has traditionally been given the British title of vice-chancellor, although in recent times the American term president has been used. The term rector is used by some academic institutions, such as the University of Melbourne residential college, Newman College, the private boys' school, Xavier College, and the University of Sydney residential college, St John's College (Benedictine).

The title rector is sometimes used for the head of a subordinate and geographically separate campus of a university. For example, the executive head of the Australian Defence Force Academy in Canberra, which is a campus of the University of New South Wales in Sydney is a rector, as is the head of the Cairns campus of James Cook University, based in Townsville.

=== New Zealand ===
The title is used in New Zealand for the headmaster of some independent schools, such as Lindisfarne College and St. Patrick's College, Silverstream, as well as a number of state schools for boys, including Otago Boys' High School, King's High School, Dunedin, Waitaki Boys' High School, Timaru Boys' High School, Palmerston North Boys' High School and Southland Boys' High School showing the Scots' involvement in the foundation of those schools.

== Africa ==
=== Benin ===
In Benin, the term is commonly used for heads of universities and academic institutions.

=== Mauritius ===
In Mauritius the term "rector" is used to designate the head of a secondary school.

== Asia ==
=== India ===
The heads of certain Indian boarding schools are called rectors. The head or principal of a Catholic school in India is also called a rector.

=== Indonesia ===
Rector is the highest executive post in universities in Indonesia. At a public university, university senate members select a pool three candidates for the education minister to decide the rector from. Except for autonomous public university (PTN-BH), rector was elected by university board of trustees. The final decision is not necessarily the one with the majority of the university senate's votes.

=== Japan ===
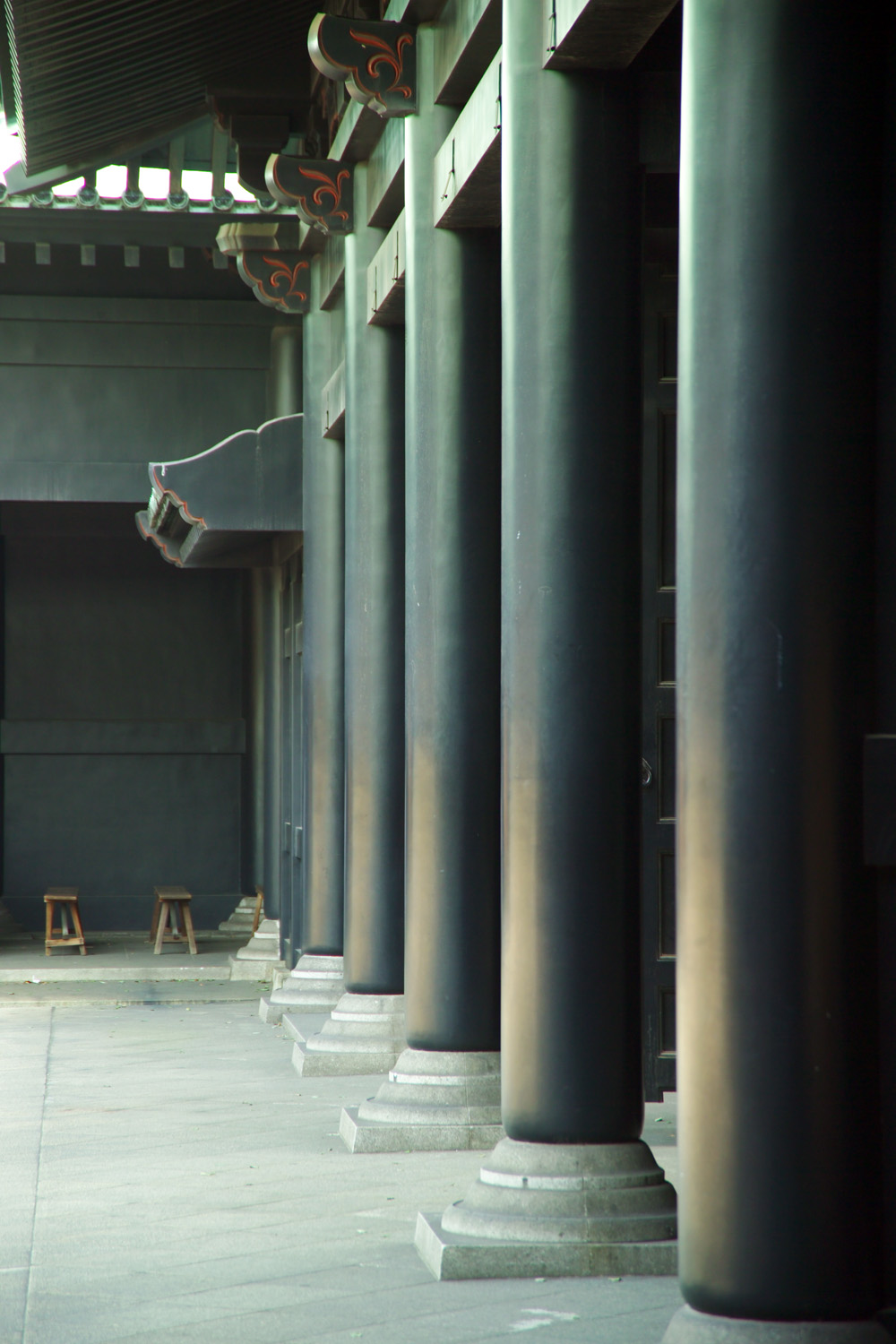
Colonnade at the reconstructed Yushima Seidō in Tokyo. The hereditary rectors of this Edo period institution were selected from the Hayashi clan.

During the years of the Tokugawa shogunate (1601–1868), the rector of Edo's Confucian Academy, the Shōhei-kō (afterwards known at the Yushima Seidō), was known by the honorific title Daigaku-no kami which, in the context of the Tokugawa hierarchy, can effectively be translated as "Head of the State University". The rector of the Yushima Seidō stood at the apex of the country-wide educational and training system which was created and maintained with the personal involvement of successive shōguns. The position as rector of the Yushima Seidō became hereditary in the Hayashi family. The rectors' scholarly reputation was burnished by the publication in 1657 of the seven volumes of Survey of the Sovereigns of Japan (日本王代一覧, Nihon Ōdai Ichiran) and by the publication in 1670 of the 310 volumes of The Comprehensive History of Japan (本朝通鑑, Honchō-tsugan).

=== Macau ===
In the former Portuguese colony of Macau, a Special Administrative Region of China since late 1999, the highest administrative officials of four universities, namely University of Macau, Macao Polytechnic University, University of Saint Joseph, and City University of Macau, are titled as 'Rector'. However, the equivalent position is 'President' at the Macau University of Science and Technology.

=== Malaysia ===
In this Commonwealth country, the term Rektor is used to refer to the highest administrative official in several universities and higher education institutions in Malaysia, such as the International Islamic University Malaysia in Gombak. For the Universiti Teknologi MARA, the term Rektor is used for head of a branch campus and answers to the Naib Canselor. A Rektor is comparable to the position of Naib Canselor, or vice-chancellor, in other higher education institutions, as the Rektor answers to the Canselor.

=== Myanmar ===
The term rector (Burmese:ပါမောက္ခချုပ်) is used to refer to the highest official of universities in Myanmar. Each university department is headed by a professor, who is responsible to the rector. Nowadays, given the large dimensions of some universities, the position of pro-rector has emerged, just below that of the rector. Pro-rectors are in charge of managing particular areas of the university, such as research or undergraduate education.

=== Pakistan ===
The heads of certain universities and colleges such as COMSATS University Islamabad, National University of Modern Languages, National University of Sciences & Technology, Ghulam Ishaq Khan Institute of Engineering Sciences and Technology, Forman Christian College, Virtual University of Pakistan and PIEAS are all titled "Rector".

=== Philippines ===
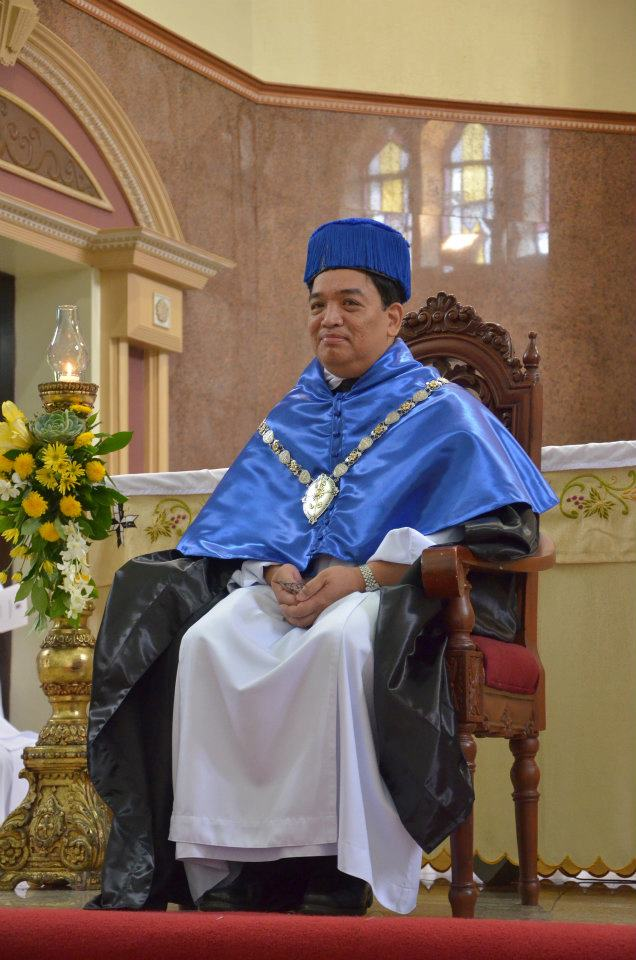
Herminio Dagohoy, the 96th Rector Magnificus of the Pontifical and Royal University of Santo Tomas, Manila

The term rector or Rector Magnificus is used to refer to the highest official in prominent Catholic universities and colleges such as the University of Santo Tomas, the Colegio de San Juan de Letran, and the San Beda University. The rector typically sits as chair of the university board of trustees. He exercises policy-making, general academic, managerial, and religious functions over all university academic and non-academic staff.

During the Spanish colonial period, on 20 May 1865, a royal order from Queen Isabella II gave the Rector Magnificus of the University of Santo Tomas the power to direct and supervise all the educational institutions in the Philippines and thus, the Rector of the university became the ex officio head of the secondary and higher education in the Philippines. All diplomas issued by other schools were approved by the Rector of the university and examinations leading to the issuance of such diplomas were supervised by the professors of the University of Santo Tomas.

=== Thailand ===
The term rector is not widely used to refer to the highest executive position in Thai universities (Thai:อธิการบดี; RTGS: Athikan Bodi ), compared to the term president. Thammasat University adopts this term for this position to reflect its tradition associated with the French education system where Pridi Banomyong, Thammasat's founding father was educated.

Except Assumption University, the only International Catholic University in Thailand, the position of the head of the executives and administrators of the institute is "rector". A decade after the present rector assume his duty, the title of Rector Magnificus was bestowed on Rev. Bro. Bancha Saenghiran, f.s.g., Ph.D. at a solemn Academic ceremony on 1 November 2011 at the Assumption University Suvarnabhumi campus in the ornate Chapel of St. Louis Marie de Montfort (founder of the Montfortian Brothers of St. Gabriel.)

== South America ==
=== Argentina ===
The term rector is used to refer to the highest official of universities, and university-owned high schools (e.g., Escuela Superior de Comercio Carlos Pellegrini) in Argentina. Each faculty (Spanish:Facultad) has its own dean.

=== Brazil ===
The term rector (Portuguese: Reitor) is used to refer to the highest official of universities in Brazil. Each faculty is headed by a director, who is under the authority of the rector. Nowadays, given the large size of some universities, the position of pro-rector has emerged below that of the rector. The pro-rector is in charge of managing a particular area of the university, such as research or undergraduate education.

== Compound titles ==
A rector who has resigned is often given the title rector emeritus. One who temporarily performs the functions usually fulfilled by a rector is styled a pro-rector (in parishes, administrator).

Deputies of rectors in institutions are known as vice-rectors (in parishes, as curates, assistant - or associate rectors, etc.). In some universities the title vice-rector has, like vice-chancellor in many Anglo-Saxon cases, been used for the de facto head when the essentially honorary title of rector is reserved for a high externa dignitary; until 1920, there was such a vice-recteur at the Parisian Sorbonne as the French Minister of Education was its nominal recteur.

== See also ==
- Chancellor (education)
- Dean (education)

== Sources ==
- Herbermann, Charles, ed. (1913). "Rector" . Catholic Encyclopedia. New York: Robert Appleton Company.
