= Ancient university governance in Scotland =

University organization system in Scotland

The ancient university governance structure in Scotland is the organisational system imposed by a series of Acts of Parliament called the Universities (Scotland) Acts 1858 to 1966. The Acts applied to what were termed the 'older universities': the University of St Andrews, the University of Glasgow, the University of Aberdeen and the University of Edinburgh. Together these four universities are commonly referred to as the ancient universities of Scotland. Whilst the Acts do not directly apply to the University of Dundee (except insofar as section 13 of the Act of 1966 conferred a power to appoint, by Order in Council, the date for its independence from the University of St Andrews), the same governance structure was ordained for use by that institution in its royal charter.

== The tripartite constitution ==
The ancient structure applies a tripartite relationship of bodies with authority over the university. These are the university court, the general council and the senatus academicus (rendered in English as the academic senate).

=== Senatus academicus ===
The senatus academicus is the supreme academic body of a university, presided over by the Principal.

The body will typically consist of the principal, any vice-principals, all professors, deans of faculties, heads of schools and colleges, elected representatives of non-professorial academic staff, elected student representatives, the university's chief librarian and any other significant persons specified in university ordinances.

In practice, the chief power of the senatus academicus is to elect a number of assessors to serve on the university court. The powers granted to the body are theoretically contained s.5 of the 1858 Act to "regulate the teaching and discipline of the University, and administer its property and revenues, subject to the control and review of the University court, as herein-after provided".

Often the full senatus rarely meets and under Section 5 has a quorum of one-third of its membership. The senatus often devolves some of its authority to a smaller academic council.

=== University court ===
The university courts were first established for the ancient universities by the 1858 Act and are responsible for the finances and administration of each university. Each university, subject to approval by the Privy Council, determines the constitution of its court, with members coming from within each university, the local community and beyond.

Changes to the statutes that govern the ancient universities are considered by the Scottish Universities Committee of the Privy Council; the Committee members include, provided that they are Privy Counsellors, the First Minister of Scotland, the Lord Justice General, the Lord Justice Clerk, the Lord Advocate, the Chancellors and Rectors of Aberdeen, Edinburgh, Glasgow, and St Andrews, and one member of the Judicial Committee. The quorum is three, and in practice the Committee's work is undertaken by the First Minister, Lord Justice General and Lord Advocate through correspondence.

In the ancient universities, but not in Dundee, the court is chaired by the rector. Members are also appointed by the general council, senatus academicus and some ex officio members drawn from the local authority. There will be a number of lay-members on the court, as well as representatives drawn from the students' representative council.

=== General council ===
The general council is a corporate body of all senior academics and graduates presided over by the chancellor of the university, an official which it elects for life. Members who are not also members of the senatus academicus are entitled to elect assessors to the university court.

Chiefly the general council is an advisory body, and exists to connect alumni with their alma mater. The general councils were also connected with the Scottish university constituencies of the Parliament of the United Kingdom until their abolition in 1950.

== Officers ==
The officers of the ancient universities often predate the Universities (Scotland) Acts which give them statutory authority by centuries.

=== Chancellor ===
The chancellor is nominal head of the university. They are elected for life by the General Council by virtue of Section 2 of the Universities (Scotland) Act 1858. The chancellor is given the statutory duty of awarding degrees, but may delegate this to a vice-chancellor and it has become convention for the chancellor to appoint the principal as vice-chancellor. The position of vice-chancellor does not confer any other powers or responsibility on the principal.

The involvement of university chancellors varies from institution to institution, in some always participating in academic ceremonies and in others almost never taking this position. The chancellor is often a member of the royal family, a local dignitary, or noble or significant academic with some tie to the university or local area. As a consequence, the chancellor's chief role is often to promote the university rather than involve themselves in the organisation of it. The Royal Commission on the Universities and Colleges of Scotland in 1826 defined the role thus:

The Chancellor is head of the University. He is consulted on all public matters relative to its welfare, and he is also Conservator of its privileges. The power of conferring degrees is vested in him: this he may exercise either personally when present or by his depute when absent, with the advice of the doctors and masters of the University.

The chancellor serves as President of the General Council once elected. They also appoint an assessor to serve on the University Court.

==== Current chancellors ====
University	Chancellor	Date appointed
University of Aberdeen	The Queen	2013
University of Dundee	The Lord Robertson of Port Ellen	2023
University of Edinburgh	The Princess Royal	2011
University of Glasgow	The Baroness Grainger	2020
University of St Andrews	Dame Anne Pringle	2026

=== Principal and vice chancellor ===
The principal is the chief executive of the university, president of the Senatus Academicus, and is appointed by the University Court. The other senior officials of the university (usually with a specific portfolio of subject or over faculties or colleges) are often titled vice principals.

Given that the principal is by custom appointed as vice-chancellor the full style of the principal is 'Principal and Vice Chancellor'; as vice-chancellor the principal can award degrees in the absence of the chancellor.

==== Current principals ====
University	Principals	Date appointed
University of Aberdeen	Peter Edwards	2025
University of Dundee	Angela Scott	2026
University of Edinburgh	Sir Peter Mathieson	2018
University of Glasgow	Andy Schofield	2025
University of St Andrews	Dame Sally Mapstone	2016

=== Rector ===
The office of rector is one of the oldest institutions of university government, dating back to the original papal bulls which formed the earliest of the ancient universities in Scotland. Originally, the rector was effective head of the university, chosen as an academic from with it, but whose power was diluted by that of the chancellor – the latter being the official representative of the Church.

Following the Protestant reformation, the previous position became inevitably untenable. As such, the position of rector evolved and has varied greatly in terms of power wielded throughout history. In recent times, the Lord Rector was given a statutory position by virtue of the 1889 Act to chair the University Court, although the Dundee rectorship is a notable exception, with the court instead appointing a lay member and the holder of the rectorship not being formally titled 'Lord Rector'. Gradually the responsibility of the rector to his electorate ensured that he also functioned as a representative of students within the university, and an external promoter of the university. Rectors in the past century have often been well-known celebrities, politicians or political activists and may not have any personal link to the university beforehand.

Today, rectors in these universities are elected for three year terms, enabling all students taking a typical four year undergraduate degree to vote at least once. The entire body of students is now typically considered together, in contrast to the old position whereby the rector was elected by student 'nations' (usually four, divided by the county in which the students originated) within the university – a practice only discontinued in the Glasgow rectorship in 1977. The Edinburgh rector is, uniquely, elected by both staff and students.

Typically, a Scottish university rector will work closely with the Students' Association and is usually commended to the chancellor or vice chancellor by the president of the association in order to be ceremonially installed. A rectorial installation is a major academic event often involving a number of traditions, most centrally a rectorial address - a speech made to the students and public.

==== Current rectors ====
University	Rector	Date appointed	End of term
University of Aberdeen	Iona Fyfe	2025	2028
University of Dundee	Maggie Chapman	2025	2028
University of Edinburgh	Simon Fanshawe	2024	2027
University of Glasgow	Ghassan Abu-Sittah	2024	2027
University of St Andrews	Arthur Bernhoff	2026	2029

== Other attributes ==
=== Students' representative councils ===
A students' representative council is a body usually, although not in the case of Glasgow, constituted within a Students' Association for the representation of student interests, particularly related to the academic administration of the university. There is a statutory obligation for the ancient governed universities to have an SRC.

=== Red undergraduate gowns ===
Undergraduate students of all the ancient governed universities in Scotland are entitled to wear the red undergraduate gown. Undergraduate members of Saint Mary's College, in the University of Saint Andrews wear a black gown with open sleeves and charged with a violet saltire cross on the left facing.

== The Universities (Scotland) Acts ==
Universities (Scotland) Act 1853 (Note: The citation of this act by this short title was authorised by section 1 of, and the first schedule to, the Short Titles Act 1896. Due to the repeal of those provisions it is now authorised by section 19(2) of the Interpretation Act 1978.)
- Act of Parliament
- Parliament of the United Kingdom
- Long title: An Act to regulate the Admission of Professors to the Lay Chairs in the Universities of Scotland.
- Citation: 16 & 17 Vict. c. 89
- Territorial extent: United Kingdom

Dates
- Royal assent: 20 August 1853
- Commencement: 20 August 1853 (Note: Section 1.)
- Repealed: 16 June 1932
Other legislation
Amended by	Statute Law Revision Act 1875
Repealed by	Statute Law Revision Act 1878; Universities (Scotland) Act 1889; Statute Law Revision Act 1892; Statute Law Revision Act 1894; Universities (Scotland) Act 1932

Status: Repealed

Text of statute as originally enacted

Universities (Scotland) Act 1858
- Act of Parliament
- Parliament of the United Kingdom
- Long title: An Act to make Provision for the better Government and Discipline of the Universities of Scotland, and improving and regulating the Course of Study therein; and for the Union of the Two Universities and Colleges of Aberdeen.
- Citation: 21 & 22 Vict. c. 83
- Territorial extent: United Kingdom

Dates
- Royal assent: 2 August 1858
- Commencement: 2 August 1858 (Note: The Acts of Parliament (Commencement) Act 1793.)
Other legislation
Amended by	Statute Law Revision Act 1875; Universities (Scotland) Act 1889; Statute Law Revision Act 1892; Statute Law Revision Act 1894; Edinburgh University (Transfer of Patronage) Act 1897; Universities (Scotland) Act 1966; Higher Education Governance (Scotland) Act 2016

Status: Amended

Text of statute as originally enacted

Revised text of statute as amended

Text of the Universities (Scotland) Act 1858 as in force today (including any amendments) within the United Kingdom, from legislation.gov.uk.

Universities (Scotland) Act 1859
- Act of Parliament
- Parliament of the United Kingdom
- Long title: An Act to remove Doubts as to Admission to the Office of Principal in the Universities of Scotland.
- Citation: 22 & 23 Vict. c. 24
- Territorial extent: United Kingdom

Dates
- Royal assent: 13 August 1859
- Commencement: 13 August 1859
- Repealed: 16 June 1932
Other legislation
Repealed by	Universities (Scotland) Act 1889; Universities (Scotland) Act 1932

Status: Repealed

Text of statute as originally enacted

Universities (Scotland) Act 1889
- Act of Parliament
- Parliament of the United Kingdom
- Long title: An Act for the better Administration and Endowment of the Universities of Scotland.
- Citation: 52 & 53 Vict. c. 55
- Territorial extent: United Kingdom

Dates
- Royal assent: 30 August 1889
- Commencement: 30 August 1889
Other legislation
Amends	Universities (Scotland) Act 1853; Universities (Scotland) Act 1858; Universities (Scotland) Act 1859
Amended by	Statute Law Revision Act 1908; Forestry (Title of Commissioners of Woods) Order 1924; Statute Law Revision Act 1950; University of St. Andrews Act 1953; Crown Estate Act 1956; Crown Estate Act 1961; Universities (Scotland) Act 1966; Scotland Act 1998 (Consequential Modifications) (No. 2) Order 1999; Abolition of Feudal Tenure etc. (Scotland) Act 2000; Higher Education Governance (Scotland) Act 2016

Status: Amended

Text of statute as originally enacted

Revised text of statute as amended

Text of the Universities (Scotland) Act 1889 as in force today (including any amendments) within the United Kingdom, from legislation.gov.uk.

Universities (Scotland) Act 1922 (Note: Section 3.)
- Act of Parliament
- Parliament of the United Kingdom
- Long title: An Act to extend the powers of the Courts of the Universities of Scotland in the making of Ordinances for the superannuation and pensioning of Principals and Professors, and for the admission of Lecturers and Readers to the Senatus Academicus, and to provide for the admission of Lecturers and Readers to membership of the General Councils of those Universities.
- Citation: 12 & 13 Geo. 5. c. 31
- Territorial extent: United Kingdom

Dates
- Royal assent: 20 July 1922
- Commencement: 20 July 1922
Other legislation
Amended by	Representation of the People Act 1948; Universities (Scotland) Act 1966

Status: Amended

Text of statute as originally enacted

Revised text of statute as amended

Text of the Universities (Scotland) Act 1922 as in force today (including any amendments) within the United Kingdom, from legislation.gov.uk.

Universities (Scotland) Act 1932 (Note: Section 7(1).)
- Act of Parliament
- Parliament of the United Kingdom
- Long title: An Act to transfer to the University Courts the right of presentation or appointment to certain chairs or professorships in the faculties of divinity or theology in the universities of Scotland; to remove restrictions as regards appointment to chairs or professorships in the said universities; to extend the powers of the University Courts of the said universities with regard to the making of ordinances, and for purposes connected therewith.
- Citation: 22 & 23 Geo. 5. c. 26
- Territorial extent: Scotland

Dates
- Royal assent: 16 June 1932
- Commencement: 16 June 1932
Other legislation
Amends	Churches (Scotland) Act 1905
Repeals/revokes	Universities (Scotland) Act 1853; Universities (Scotland) Act 1859
Amended by	Statute Law Revision Act 1950; Universities (Scotland) Act 1966
Relates to	Universities Tests Act 1871

Status: Amended

Text of statute as originally enacted

Revised text of statute as amended

Text of the Universities (Scotland) Act 1932 as in force today (including any amendments) within the United Kingdom, from legislation.gov.uk.

Universities (Scotland) Act 1966 (Note: Section 17(1).)
- Act of Parliament
- Parliament of the United Kingdom
- Long title: An Act to amend the law relating to the Universities of St. Andrews, Glasgow, Aberdeen and Edinburgh; to make provisions consequential on the foundation of a University of Dundee; and for purposes connected therewith.
- Citation: 1966 c. 13
- Territorial extent: United Kingdom

Dates
- Royal assent: 10 March 1966
- Commencement: 10 March 1966 (in part); (rest of act); (Note: Section 17(2).)
Other legislation
Amends	Universities (Scotland) Act 1858; Universities (Scotland) Act 1889; Universities (Scotland) Act 1922; Universities (Scotland) Act 1932
Repeals/revokes	University of St. Andrews Act 1953
Amended by	Statute Law (Repeals) Act 1974; Medical Act 1983

Status: Amended

Text of statute as originally enacted

Revised text of statute as amended

Text of the Universities (Scotland) Act 1966 as in force today (including any amendments) within the United Kingdom, from legislation.gov.uk.

The following are the acts of the Parliament of the United Kingdom known as the Universities (Scotland) acts. These acts of Parliament formed the basis of the modern system of governance in the ancient universities of Scotland – with the same principles being incorporated into the University of Dundee's royal charter. The acts may be cited together as the Universities (Scotland) Acts 1858 to 1966. Regulation of higher education is, since 1999, a devolved matter, within the legislative competence of the Scottish Parliament.

- Text of the Universities (Scotland) Act 1858 (c. 83) as in force today (including any amendments) within the United Kingdom, from legislation.gov.uk.
- Text of the Universities (Scotland) Act 1889 (c. 55) as in force today (including any amendments) within the United Kingdom, from legislation.gov.uk.
- Text of the Universities (Scotland) Act 1922 (c. 31) as in force today (including any amendments) within the United Kingdom, from legislation.gov.uk.
- Text of the Universities (Scotland) Act 1932 (c. 26) as in force today (including any amendments) within the United Kingdom, from legislation.gov.uk.
- Text of the Universities (Scotland) Act 1966 (c. 13) as in force today (including any amendments) within the United Kingdom, from legislation.gov.uk.

=== Other consequences ===
Aside from providing a constitution for university governance, the Universities (Scotland) Acts also had a number of other consequences for higher education in Scotland. The 1858 act laid the foundations for a merger between King's College, Aberdeen and Marischal College, also in Aberdeen, to form the University of Aberdeen in 1860. The 1966 act pre-empted the creation of the University of Dundee from Queen's College of the University of St Andrews. The 1889 act created a Scottish Universities Committee within the Privy Council and made provisions to allow for the expansion of the Scottish universities. The 1932 act repealed the requirement for principals and professors to declare themselves as being of the Protestant faith, formerly a requirement of the Protestant Religion and Presbyterian Church Act 1707.

== Anomalies ==
There are a number of anomalies to the general structures outlined above, although where notable they have attempted to be incorporated into the article itself:

=== University of Aberdeen ===
- The University of Aberdeen's students' representative council uses the name 'Students' Association Council', despite its legal name being unchanged, to emphasise its links with the Aberdeen University Students' Association.

=== University of Dundee ===
- The University of Dundee's status is not governed by the Universities (Scotland) Acts, but instead laid down in the university's own Royal Charter. This is the result of Dundee, previously an incorporated college of the University of St Andrews, having attained its independent university status in 1967. While this makes little difference in practice, it separates Dundee from the ancient universities in legal terms.
- The Rector of the University of Dundee was only granted the style 'Rector' in the Royal Charter and hence is not properly entitled to the formal style of 'Lord Rector'. The rector at the University of Dundee lacks the right to chair meetings of the University Court, as the members of the court elect a lay member as chair.

=== University of Edinburgh ===
- The Rector of the University of Edinburgh is elected by both staff and matriculated students, as opposed to the other four Rectors who are elected by their university's students alone.

=== University of Glasgow ===
- The Glasgow University students' representative council, unlike in other universities, is not effectively incorporated into a Students' Association as Glasgow maintains two student unions (the Glasgow University Union and the Queen Margaret Union).
