= Asthma and Allergy Foundation =

Asthma and Allergy Foundation may refer to:

- Asthma and Allergy Foundation, Scottish charity founded by Martina Chukwuma-Ezike
- Asthma and Allergy Foundation of America
