= Patrick Robertson, Lord Robertson =

Scottish judge

Patrick Robertson, Lord Robertson (1794–1855) was a Scottish judge and Senator of the College of Justice.

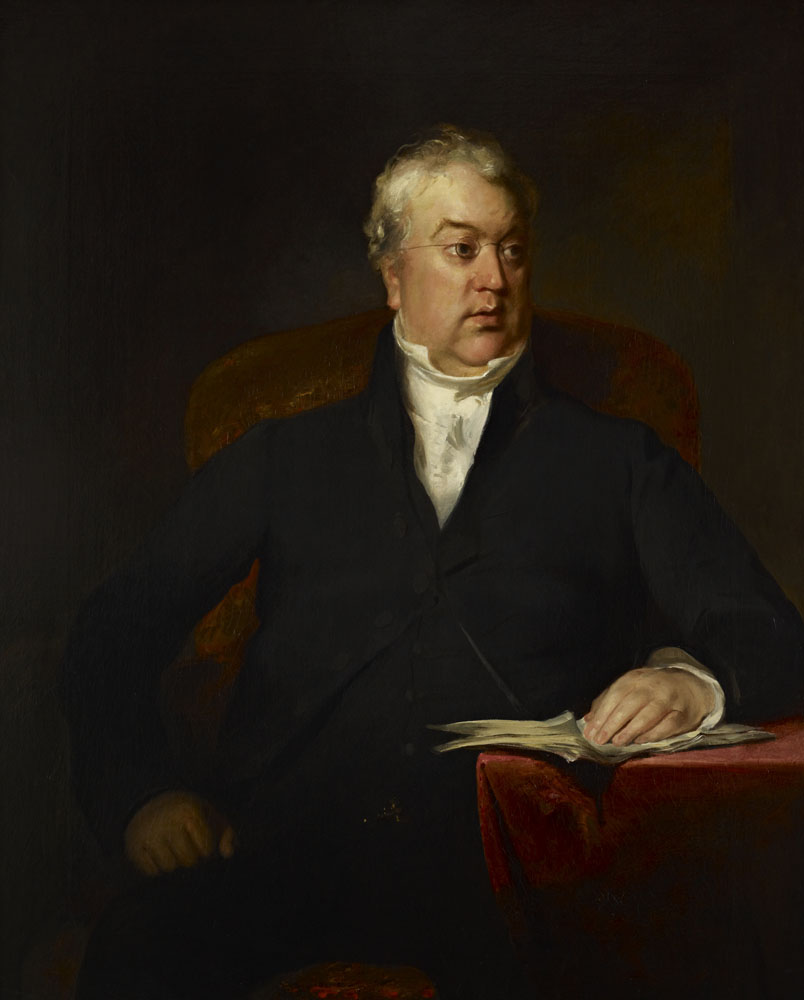
Patrick Robertson, Lord Robertson

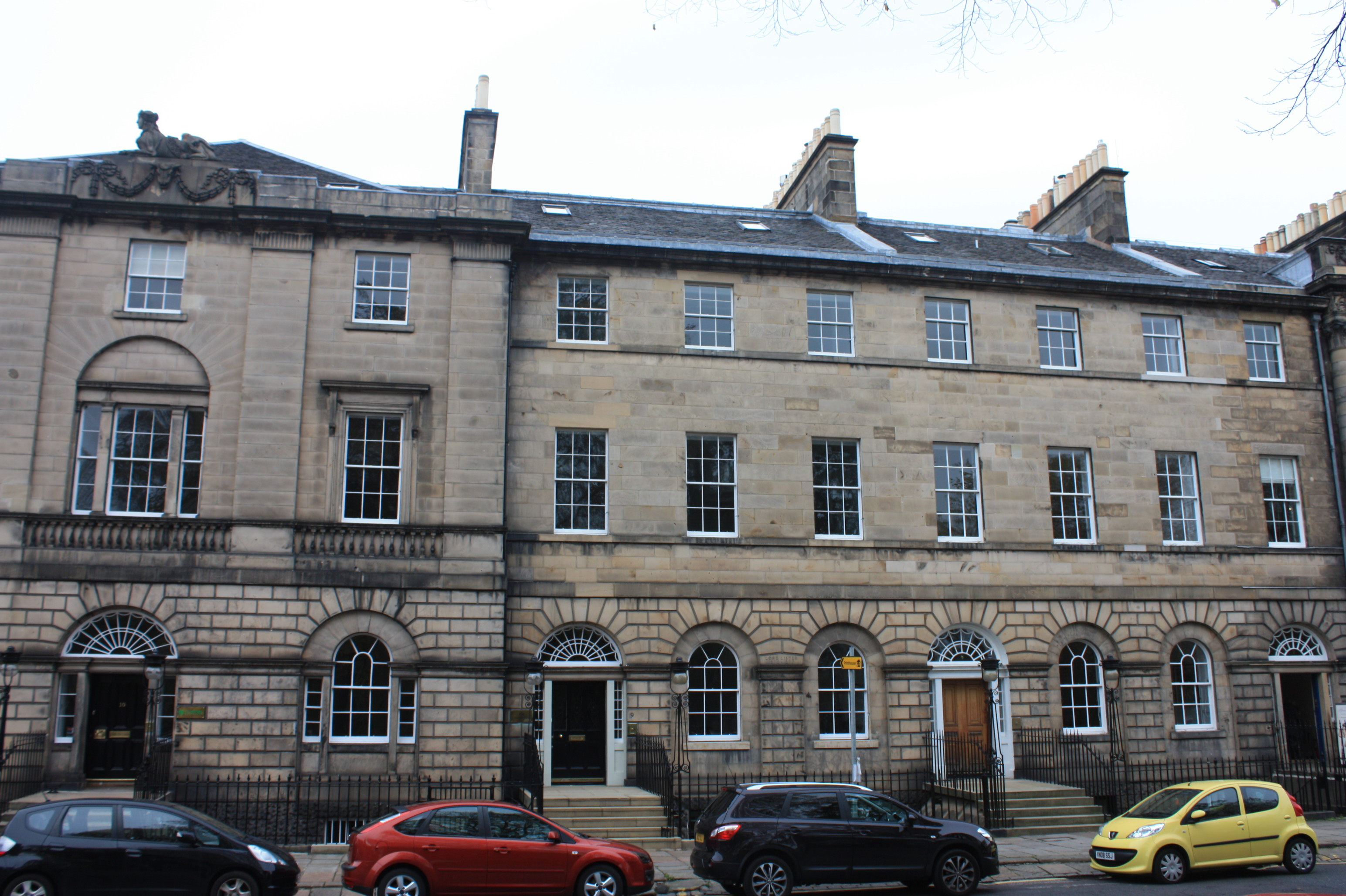
Lord Robertson's house at 9 Charlotte Square, Edinburgh (centre)

== Life ==
Born in Edinburgh on 17 February 1794, he was the second son of James Robertson, writer to the signet (died 15 April 1820) and Mary Saunders. He was educated at Edinburgh high school, and was called to the Scottish bar on 27 May 1815, along with his friend John Wilson. He soon obtained a practice, both in the Court of Session and before the General Assembly.

Robertston was commonly called by the diminutive "Peter", and was known as a wit. He was present at the theatrical fund dinner in Edinburgh on 23 Feb. 1827, when Sir Walter Scott acknowledged the authorship of the Waverley novels; owing to the rotundity of his figure, Scott named him "Peter o' the Painch" for his rotund figure.

In January 1838 Robertson defended the Glasgow cotton-spinners before the High Court of Justiciary at Edinburgh. On 29 November 1842 he was chosen Dean of the Faculty of Advocates.

Robertson was appointed an ordinary lord of session in the place of Lord Meadowbank in November 1843, and took his seat on the bench as Lord Robertson. In 1848 he was elected by the students Lord Rector of Marischal College and University of Aberdeen, and received an honorary doctorate (LLD).

He died suddenly, from apoplexy, at his house at 32 Drummond Place, Edinburgh, on 10 January 1855, aged 60. He was buried in the burial vault of Robert Pont in St Cuthbert's churchyard at the west end of Princes Street, on the 15th of the same month.

A marble tablet was erected to his memory in St Giles' Cathedral.

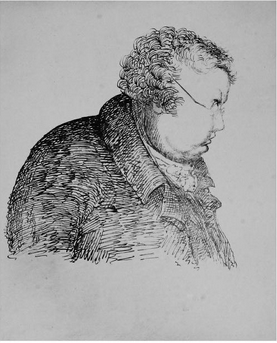
Patrick Robertson, Lord Robertson by Robert Scott Moncrieff

== Works ==
Lockhart made several rhyming epitaphs on Scott, and wrote a vivid description of his mock-heroic speech at the Burns dinner of 1818. He was the author of t volumes of verse:

- Leaves from a Journal [Edinburgh], 1844, privately printed.
- Leaves from a Journal and other Fragments in Verse, London, 1845, including most of the previous.
- Gleams of Thought reflected from the Writings of Milton; Sonnets, and other Poems, Edinburgh, 1847.
- Sonnets, reflective and descriptive, and other Poems, Edinburgh, 1849.
- Sonnets, reflective and descriptive, Second Series, Edinburgh, 1854.

His speeches in the Stewarton case (1842) and the Strathbogie case (1843) were printed.

== Family ==
Robertson married, on 8 April 1819, Mary Cameron, daughter of the Rev. Thomas Ross, D.D., minister of Kilmonivaig, Inverness-shire, by whom he had several children. His second son, Major-general Patrick Robertson-Ross, C.B., died at Boulogne on 23 July 1883, having assumed the additional surname of Ross on inheriting the property of his uncle, Lieutenant-general Hugh Ross of Glenmoidart, Inverness-shire, in 1865.

== Notes ==
Attribution

This article incorporates text from a publication now in the public domain: Lee, Sidney, ed. (1896). "Robertson, Patrick". Dictionary of National Biography. Vol. 48. London: Smith, Elder & Co.
