= Maitland Mackie (farmer) =

Scottish farmer and businessman (1937-2014)

Maitland Mackie CBE

Lord Rector of the University of Aberdeen
- In office March 2012 – May 2014
- Preceded by: Stephen Robertson
- Succeeded by: Maggie Chapman

Personal details
- Born: 21 September 1937 Rothienorman, Aberdeenshire, Scotland
- Died: May 31, 2014 (aged 76) Rothienorman, Aberdeenshire, Scotland
- Citizenship: United Kingdom
- Party: Liberal (until 1988); Liberal Democrats (since 1988)
- Spouse: Halldis Aslaug Ramm
- Children: 3
- Parent: Maitland Mackie (father)
- Education: Aberdeen Grammar School
- Alma mater: University of Aberdeen

Maitland Mackie CBE (21 September 1937 – 31 May 2014) was a Scottish farmer, businessman, and entrepreneur. He held roles as vice-president of the National Farmers Union of Scotland and as a member of the Agriculture Food Research Council. He was a former governor of the Rowett Research Institute, and a former chairman of the Scottish Agricultural College Board. He founded the Scottish Pig Industry Initiative. For this work he received the David Black Award – the top honour in the UK pig industry. He was appointed CBE for his wider services to agriculture in 1991. He stood as a Liberal Party candidate in several elections. He was at the time of his death Rector of the University of Aberdeen.

== Early life and education ==
Maitland Mackie was born in Rothienorman, Aberdeenshire on 21 September 1937. He was the third generation of his family to bear that name. His father was Sir Maitland Mackie. He was brought up and lived all his life at the family farm at Westertown, Rothienorman. He attended Daviot Primary School and Aberdeen Grammar School. He graduated from the University of Aberdeen with an BSc in 1958. He returned to Aberdeen University to study for an MA in economics which he achieved in 1971.

== Career ==
On graduating, Mackie began working on the family farm which his grandfather had established in the late 19th century, moving to Westertown in 1912. When he assumed the running of the business he developed it to become a major farm and milk retailing business with a multi-million pound turnover employing 250 local people.

In 1994, Mackie rationalised the business to ensure that it remained competitive. He sold off the milk retailing section and diversified into the production of premium dairy ice-creams from the old farm buildings. The ice cream business proved successful. In 2014 it supplied all major supermarkets and had a 45% share of Scotland's premium ice cream market.

Mackie was a former vice president of National Farmers Union of Scotland and a past chairman of the Scottish Agricultural College. He stood as a Liberal Democrat candidate in the first Scottish Parliamentary election in 1999 coming third to future First Minister Alex Salmond. He had previously stood as a Liberal candidate in the first Grampian Regional Council election in 1975.

== Awards and honours ==
In 1991, Mackie was made CBE for services to agriculture. He was awarded an honorary law degree in 1999 by the University of Aberdeen University. He served on its Court since 2000, was elected Lord Rector in 2011.

== Personal life ==
While at University he met his future wife, Halldis Aslaug Ramm, the university's Charity Queen of 1958, who came from Bergen, Norway. They married in July 1961. She graduated as a doctor and practiced as a GP in the local area.

Mackie was diagnosed with a malignant brain tumour two weeks after his wife died in February 2014. He died at Rothienorman on 31 May 2014 and is interred at the Arboretum. He had two daughters and a son.

Academic offices
Preceded by Stephen Robertson	Rector of the University of Aberdeen; 2012 – 2014	Succeeded by Maggie Chapman
