= Andrew Mitchell (diplomat, born 1708) =

British politician and diplomat (1708–1771)

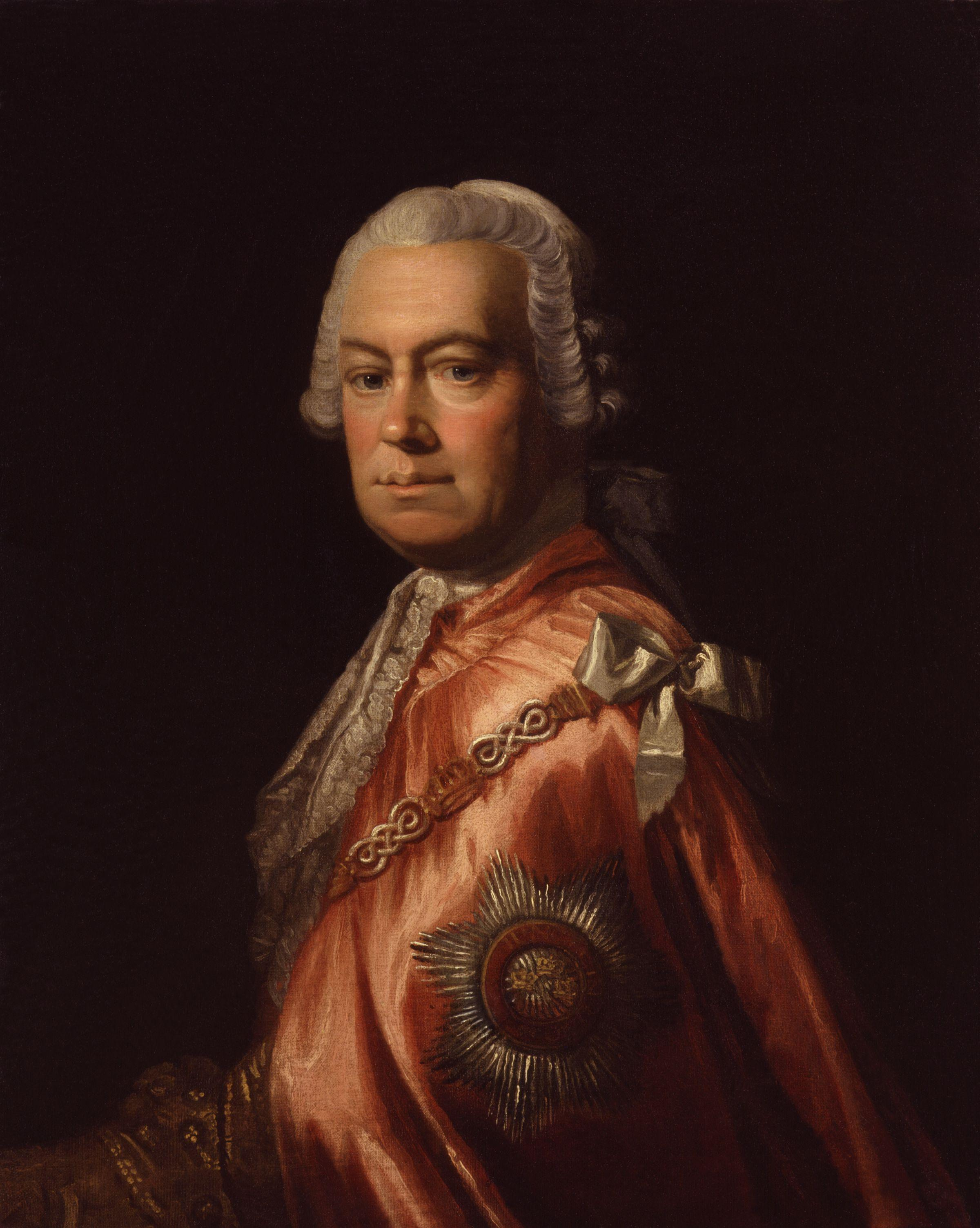
Sir Andrew Mitchell

Sir Andrew Mitchell (1708–1771) was a British diplomat noted for his service as envoy to the court of Frederick the Great during the Seven Years' War.

== Early Career and Interests ==
Mitchell was the son of the Rev. William Mitchell, minister of St Giles and King's chaplain and educated at the University of Edinburgh, Leyden University (1730–31), Paris (1731–32,) and Italy (1732–35). He then entered the Middle Temple in 1734 to study law, where he was called to the bar in 1738. He was made advocate in 1736.

His legal and intellectual interests took him frequently abroad, and in 1735 he formed a close friendship with Montesquieu in Paris. He took up a broad spectrum of intellectual pursuits that encompassed ancient and modern history, art, literature, and moral philosophy; in 1736 he was elected a Fellow of the Royal Society.

== Diplomatic career ==
He served as under-secretary for Scotland from 1742 to 1746. He was a commissary in Brussels for negotiating a commercial agreement with Austria and the Netherlands from 1752 to 1755 and an envoy to Prussia from 1756 to June 1765 and from December 1765 to his death.

== Envoy to Prussia ==
In May 1756, Mitchell arrived in Berlin, and was enthusiastically received by Frederick. Prior to this, antagonism had steadily been building between France and England over shipping and territory rights, and the British king, concerned with the exposure of his Hanoverian territories should war arise, wished to draw closer to Prussia. It was Mitchell's task to negotiate the Alliance and allay Frederick's fears of an Austro-Russian counter-alliance. Frederick, who resented the broken promises and secret diplomacy of the French court during the Silesian Wars, was amenable, and England remained his only steady ally throughout the Seven Years' War.

Mitchell stayed with Frederick, recording his observations of the king at war in his journals, until his recall in 1764. He returned to Berlin two years later, having been knighted in the interim, and remained until his death in 1771. Though the relationship between Mitchell and Frederick had suffered from Frederick's dissatisfaction with English policy at the end of the war and Mitchell's disenchantment with Frederick's "impatience of contradiction", Frederick wrote in tribute that, "His talents and character had wholly gained my esteem and he retained it to the end of his days." Frederick wept openly at Mitchell's funeral procession.

== Parliamentary career ==
He was elected at the 1747 general election as the Member of Parliament (MP) for Aberdeenshire, and held the seat until the 1754 general election. He was elected as MP for Elgin Burghs at a by-election in January 1755, and held that seat until his death in 1771.

He was created KB on 13 December 1765.

== Private life ==
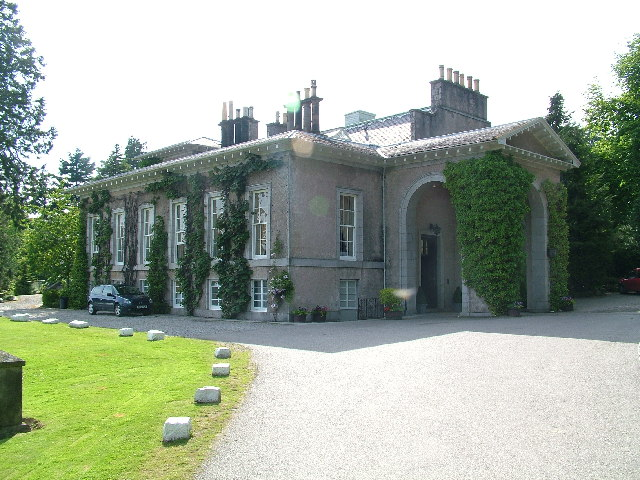
Thainstone House today, now an hotel

He had been married by his father at the age of 14 to a 10 year old heiress, his second cousin Barbara, the daughter and heiress of Thomas Mitchell of Thainstone, near Aberdeen. His wife died in childbirth in 1728. He lived at the old Thainstone House, before it was remodelled in 1840.

== Writings ==
- Memoirs and Papers of Sir Andrew Mitchell

Parliament of Great Britain
Preceded by Sir Arthur Forbes, Bt	Member of Parliament for Aberdeenshire; 1747–1754	Succeeded by Lord Adam Gordon
Preceded by William Grant	Member of Parliament for Elgin Burghs; 1755–1771	Succeeded by Thomas Lockhart
