= Rector of the University of Aberdeen =

Students' representative and chairman in the University Court

The Lord Rector of the University of Aberdeen is the students' representative and chairperson in the University Court of the University of Aberdeen. The position is rarely known by its full title and most often referred to simply as "Rector". The rector is elected by students of the university and serves a three-year term. Although the position has existed since 1495, it was only officially made the students' representative in 1860.

The position exists in common throughout the ancient universities of Scotland with rectorships also in existence at the universities of St Andrews, Glasgow and Edinburgh. The newer University of Dundee has a rector due to its historical ties to St Andrews. The position is given legal standing by virtue of the Universities (Scotland) Act 1889 and is the third office of precedence in the university following the Chancellor and Principal. Rectors also appoint a rector's assessor, who may carry out their functions when they are absent from the university.

== Rector's Assessor ==
Each rector appoints a Rector's Assessor to the University Court. He or she maintains a permanent seat in the University Court during the period of their duty. The Rector's Assessor furthermore acts, with the support of the president of the Students' Association, as the Rector's representative when the Rector cannot be present, additionally they sit on the Joint Planning, Finance & Estates Committee and Student Affairs Committee in an official permanent capacity. Further roles and responsibilities include being a 'focal point' for the student body to interact with the decision making levels of university governance, and coordinating the on-campus and online presence for the Rector.

== List of rectors ==
=== Rector of King's College, Aberdeen ===
- 1637–?: Arthur Johnston
- 1639–1644: William Guild
- 1651–?: Andrew Cant
- 1677–1682: John Menzies
- 1805–1814: The 1st Baron Glenbervie
- 1827–1837: The 8th Viscount of Arbuthnott
- 1838–1857: Lord Francis Egerton,M.P.
- 1857–?: John Inglis (who became Lord Glencorse in 1858)

=== Rector of Marischal College, Aberdeen ===
- 1664–?: Rev. Dr Arthur Rose
- 1673–?: George Meldrum
- 1675–1678: No record
- 1679–: Patrick Sibbald
- 1687–1688: No record
- 1688–1691: Dr William Blair
- 1691–1713: No record
- 1714–1715: John Urquhart, Laird of Meldrum
- 1715–1719: No record
- 1720–1723: Sir William Forbes
- 1723–1726: Thomas Forbes
- 1726–1729: Patrick Duff
- 1729–: William Duff of Braco
- 1730–1731: No record
- 1732–: Sir Alexander Ramsay of Balmain
- 1733–1736: No record
- 1737–: George Skene
- 1746–1760: No record
- 1761–1764: Sir Arthur Forbes, 4th Baronet, of Craigievar
- 1764–1770: John Gray
- 1770–: Alexander Fordyce
- 1772–1781: No record
- 1782–1788: Cosmo Gordon of Cluny
- 1788–1790: Francis Garden of Gardenstown
- 1790–1792: Sir William Fordyce
- 1792 – 1794: Sir William Forbes, Bt, of Pitsligo
- 1794–1796: James Ferguson, M.P.
- 1796–1798: Alexander Allardyce of Dunnotar, M.P.
- 1798–1800: Sir Alexander Ramsay-Irvine of Balmain, 6th Baronet
- 1800–1802: Sir William Forbes, 5th Baronet of Craigievar
- 1802–1809: Alexander Baxter of Glassel
- 1809–1814: Sir William Grant, M.P., Master of the Rolls
- 1814–1819: Charles Forbes of Auchmedden, M.P.
- 1820–1822: The 4th Earl Fife
- 1822–1823: Charles Forbes of Auchmedden, M.P.
- 1823–1824: The 4th Earl Fife
- 1824–1826: Joseph Hume, M.P.
- 1826–1828: Sir James McGrigor
- 1828–1829: Joseph Hume, M.P.
- 1829–1830: No rector
- 1830–1831: Charles Forbes of Auchmedden, M.P.
- 1831–1832: The 18th Earl of Erroll
- 1832–1833: Sir Michael Bruce of Stenhouse, 8th Baronet
- 1833–1834: Sir Charles Forbes of Newe and Edinglassie, Bt
- 1834–1836: Alexander Bannerman, M.P.
- 1836–1837: Dr John Abercrombie
- 1837–1838: John, Lord Lyndhurst
- 1838–1839: Henry Brougham, 1st Baron Brougham and Vaux
- 1839–1840: John Campbell Colquhoun of Killermont
- 1840–1841: Sir George Sinclair of Ulbster
- 1841–1842: Sir James McGrigor, 1st Baronet,
- 1842–1843: Sir John Herschel
- 1843–1845: The 2nd Marquess of Breadalbane
- 1845–1848: Archibald Alison, Sheriff of Lanarkshire
- 1848–1849: Lord Robertson
- 1849–1851: John Thomson Gordon
- 1851–1853: The 13th Earl of Eglinton
- 1853–1854: The 7th Earl of Carlisle
- 1854–1855: Colonel William Henry Sykes, M.P.
- 1855–1858: Austen Henry Layard, M.P.
- 1858–1859: The 5th Earl Stanhope

=== Rector of the University of Aberdeen ===
- 1860–1863: Edward Francis Maitland (became Lord Barcaple in 1862)
- 1863–1866: The 1st Earl Russell, Prime Minister 1865-1866
- 1866–1872: M.E. Grant Duff, M.P., Under-Secretary of State for India 1868-1874
- 1872–1875: Thomas Henry Huxley
- 1875–1878: W.E. Forster, M.P.
- 1878–1881: The 5th Earl of Rosebery
- 1881–1884: Prof. Alexander Bain
- 1884–1887: Prof. Alexander Bain
- 1887–1890: George Goschen, M.P.
- 1890–1899: The 11th Marquess of Huntly
- 1899–1902: The 1st Baron Strathcona and Mount Royal
- 1902–1905: Charles Ritchie, M.P., Chancellor of the Exchequer 1902-1903
- 1905–1908: Sir Frederick Treves, 1st Bt.
- 1908–1911: H.H. Asquith, M.P., Prime Minister
- 1911–1914: Andrew Carnegie
- 1914–1918: Winston Churchill, M.P., First Lord of the Admiralty until May 1915. Thereafter, Chancellor of the Duchy of Lancaster until Nov. 1915.
- 1918–1921: The 1st Viscount Cowdray
- 1921–1924: Sir Robert Horne, M.P., Chancellor of the Exchequer 1921–1922.
- 1924–1927: The 1st Viscount Cecil of Chelwood, Chancellor of the Duchy of Lancaster
- 1927–1930: The 1st Earl of Birkenhead, Secretary of State for India 1924-1928
- 1930–1933: Prof. Sir Arthur Keith
- 1933–1936: Walter Elliot, M.P.
- 1936–1942: Admiral Sir Edward Evans
- 1942–1945: Sir Stafford Cripps, M.P., Lord Privy Seal in 1942 and Minister of Aircraft Production 1942–1945.
- 1945–1948: Eric Linklater
- 1948–1951: The 2nd Baron Tweedsmuir
- 1951–1954: Jimmy Edwards
- 1954–1957: Admiral of the Fleet Sir Rhoderick McGrigor
- 1957–1960: John MacDonald Bannerman
- 1960–1963: Peter Scott
- 1963–1966: Brigadier Sir John Hunt
- 1966–1969: Frank George Thomson
- 1969–1972: Jo Grimond, M.P.
- 1972–1975: Michael Barratt
- 1975–1978: Iain Cuthbertson
- 1978–1981: Sandy Gall
- 1981–1984: Robert J. Perryment
- 1985–1988: Cllr. Hamish Watt
- 1988–1990: Willis Pickard
- 1991–1993: Colin Bell
- 1993–1996: Ian Hamilton
- 1996–1998: Dr Allan Macartney, M.E.P. (died in office)
- 1998–2004: Clarissa Dickson Wright
- 2005–2008: Robin Harper, M.S.P.
- 2008–2011: Stephen Robertson
- 2012–2014: Maitland Mackie (died in office)
- 2015–2021: Maggie Chapman
- 2022–2024: Martina Chukwuma-Ezike
- 2025–present: Iona Fyfe

== See also ==
- Aberdeen University Students' Association
- Chancellor of the University of Aberdeen
- Principal of the University of Aberdeen
- Ancient university governance in Scotland
