= John Gray (mathematician) =

British mathematician

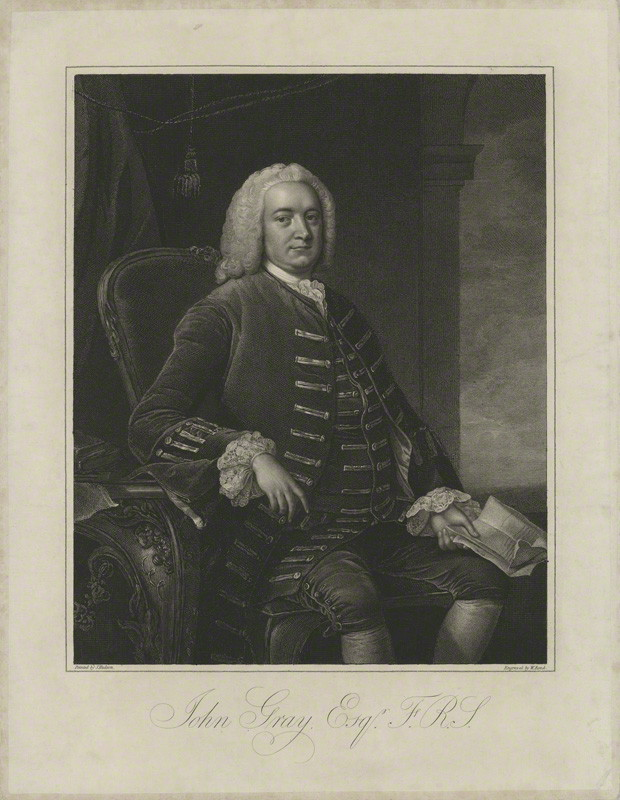
John Gray FRS

John Gray, FRS (died 17 July 1769) was a British mathematician.

As a young man he taught mathematics at Marischal College, later Aberdeen University.

He wrote "A Treatise on Gunnery", dedicated to the Duke of Argyll and published by William Innys (London) in 1731.

In collaboration with Andrew Reid and others, he worked to produce a book of abridged Philosophical Transactions of the Royal Society for 1720–1732; which was published by W. Innys and R. Manby in 1732.

In March 1732 he was elected a Fellow of the Royal Society, his application citation having described him as being of the Navy Office (or Navy Board), who were responsible for the construction and maintenance of ships in the Royal Dockyards for the Royal Navy.

From 1764 to his death he was Rector of Marischal College. He died at his London home in 1769, having asked to be buried at Petersham next to his wife Elizabeth. He left estates in the West Indies to his nephews and 1,000 acres (400 ha) to Gray's Inn of London.

Academic offices
| Preceded by Sir Arthur Forbes, 4th Baronet | Rector of Marischal College, Aberdeen; 1764–1770 | Succeeded by Alexander Fordyce |
