= Sir Arthur Forbes, 4th Baronet =

Scottish Whig politician (1709-1773)

Arms of Forbes of Craigievar: Azure a cross patee fitchee or between three bears’ heads couped argent, muzzled gules.

Sir Arthur Forbes, 4th Baronet (1709–1773), of Craigievar, Aberdeen, was a Scottish Whig politician who sat in the House of Commons from 1732 to 1747.

Forbes was the sixth, but eldest surviving son of Sir William Forbes, 3rd Baronet of Craigievar, and his wife Margaret Rose, daughter of Hugh Rose of Kilravock, Nairn. He succeeded his father in May 1722 at the age of 12 to an estate burdened with debts. He was educated at Marischal College, Aberdeen from about 1723 to 1727. He married Christian Ross, eldest daughter of John Ross of Arnage, Aberdeen, provost of Aberdeen in 1729. She died on 6 October 1733.

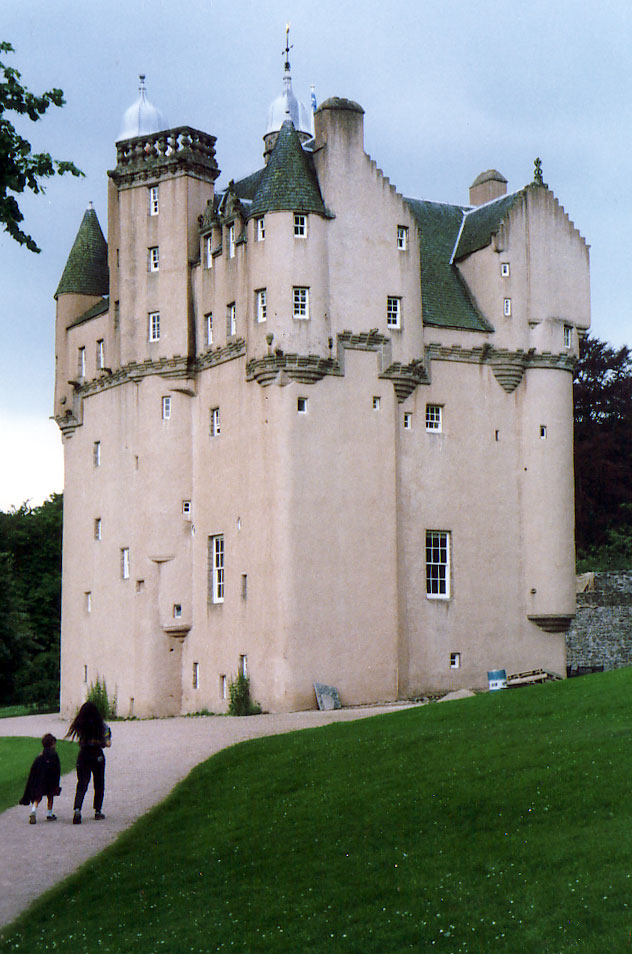
Craigievar Castle

Forbes was returned unopposed as Member of Parliament for Aberdeenshire at a by-election on 13 July 1732 after Sir Archibald Grant, Bt was expelled from the house. He became a government supporter. At the 1734 general election, he was re-elected for Aberdeenshire in a contest. He became a close friend of the Duke of Argyll. In January 1738, he was a supporter of the Administration when he obtained a commission for his brother through the secretary at war, but when the Duke of Argyll changed sides, he followed, voting against the Government on the Spanish convention in 1739 and the place bill of 1740. He was returned unopposed at the 1741 general election and voted against Walpole’s candidate for the chairman of the elections committee in December. He was known as a member of the Duke of Argyll’s gang and voted against the Hanoverians in 1742 and 1744. At the 1747 general election, he retired from Parliament in favour of Andrew Mitchell who was a relation of his.

Forbes made a second marriage on 2 October 1749, to Margaret Burnett, widow of John Burnett of Elrick, Aberdeen, and daughter of Strachan, of Balgall. He was Rector of Marischal College, Aberdeen from 1761 to 1764. He died on 1 January 1773 with two daughters from his first wife, and four daughters and five sons by his second wife. He was succeeded by his eldest surviving son William.

Parliament of Great Britain
Preceded by Sir Archibald Grant, Bt	Member of Parliament for Aberdeenshire; 1732–1747	Succeeded by Andrew Mitchell
Baronetage of Nova Scotia
Preceded by William Forbes	Baronet (of Craigievar); 1722–1773	Succeeded by William Forbes
Academic offices
Preceded by No record	Rector of Marischal College, Aberdeen; 1761–1764	Succeeded by John Gray
