= Rector of the University of Dundee =

University leader

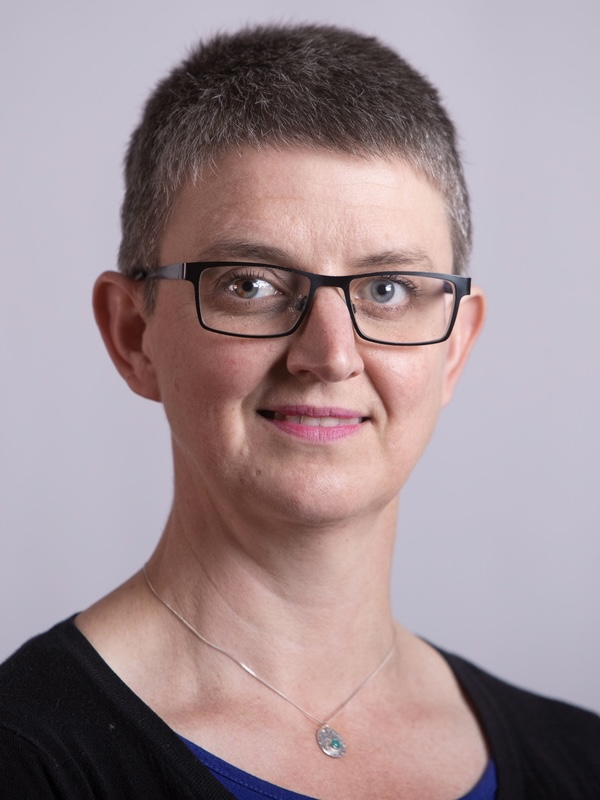
Current rector Maggie Chapman

The rector of the University of Dundee is elected by the matriculated students of the University of Dundee. From 1967 (when the university gained independence from the University of St. Andrews) to 2010, the rector was automatically a full member of the University Court (the university governing body). The rector also had the right to appoint an assessor, who was also a full member of the University Court. Following changes made to the university charter in August 2010, the rector must choose to take up full membership of the University Court or appoint an assessor who has full voting rights.

If the rector chooses not take up full membership of court, they retain the right to receive court papers and attend its meetings but not to vote. The present holder of the position is Maggie Chapman, a member of the Scottish Parliament who was elected to the position in 2025.

Aside from their official duties to the university, the rector is charged with the responsibility of representing the students of the university who elect a new rector for a three-year term. The rector is officially installed in a ceremony soon after their election by the university's chancellor or, in their place, the vice-chancellor.

== History ==
The position of rector in the ancient universities of Scotland dates back centuries and is one of the oldest offices in academic governance in Scotland. To this day, it exists only in the ancient universities of Scotland and at the University of Dundee, which inherited some of the traditions and governance structure from the University of St Andrews.

The modern rectorship evolved and was given legal status under the Universities (Scotland) Act 1889. Prior to 1967, the University of Dundee was an integral college of the University of St Andrews and styled as Queen's College, Dundee, or University College, Dundee. The rector of the university represented students at all the constituent colleges of St Andrews, including Queens College, Dundee. Therefore, before its independence, the rector of the University of St Andrews was rector and the appropriate official for covering what was to become the University of Dundee.

On gaining independent university status in 1967, the position of Rector of the University of Dundee was created under Article 5 of the university's Royal Charter, which states:

"There shall be a Rector of the University who shall be elected by the matriculated students of the University in such manner and for such period as may be prescribed by the Statutes."

Since 1967, there have been thirteen rectors of the University of Dundee, three of which have served two consecutive terms. Notable is the legend of unconfirmed certainty that a hamster was once nominated for the post. Its acceptance of the nomination was allegedly made with an ink-paw print, which was not permitted by the university on the grounds that true consent could not be assured, and duress may have been involved. The legend may be based on the confirmed story of a goat named Mervyn who was nominated for the position in 1971, but rejected by the returning officer. A dispute over the validity of the 1971 election result caused an unofficial second poll to be organised by the Students' Association, and Mervyn was permitted to stand in this. Although Mervyn did not win, he beat Paul Foot for third place.

== Current status ==
As mentioned above, the position exists in common throughout the ancient universities of Scotland with rectorships at the Universities of Glasgow, Edinburgh, Aberdeen and St Andrews. Together, the rectors combine to form the Scottish Rectors Group.

Rectors also appoint a rector's assessor, who may carry out their functions when temporarily absent from the university. In many cases, such as the terms of Lorraine Kelly or Tony Slattery, the relevant assessor carried out the majority of the rector's functions: both only rarely attended court meetings in person, but Kelly was notable for participation in many fund raising and charitable activities connected with the university.

== Election and installation ==
Rectors are nominated by the gathering of fifty signatures by students. Close to the rectorial election, the Students' Association traditionally hosts a hustings debate, known as the Hecklings, in which all nominees get a chance to put forward their case. The nominees also traditionally make an appearance on the university campus during the election day to canvass for last minute support, assisted by a campaign team of students. The election is organised by a member of the Senatus Academicus, usually the Academic Secretary.

If an election is tied between two candidates, the Chancellor has the deciding vote on the matter. Neither staff members at Dundee nor students matriculated at any university are eligible to stand The election is always held in January or February if the election is not precipitated by a resignation during the rector's term of office, on a day appointed by the Senatus Academicus in consultation with the Students' Association.

The installation is held usually two or three months following the election. In the past, the ceremony was held in the Caird Hall in the City Centre, but recent ceremonies have been held in the university's own Bonar Hall, the last ceremony was expected to take place in the smaller Ustinov Room of the Bonar Hall, but it had to be moved at the last minute to a lecture theatre in the new teaching block as a result of unexpected demand. The installation itself is made by the Chancellor (or, if unavailable, the Vice-Chancellor) with the formal introduction of the rector to the students being made by the president of the Students' Association. Following a meeting with the Lord Provost of Dundee, the rector is 'dragged' in the university's carriage from Dundee City Chambers to the university by one of the sports teams in a parade, often stopping off at public houses along the way for refreshments.

== List of rectors ==
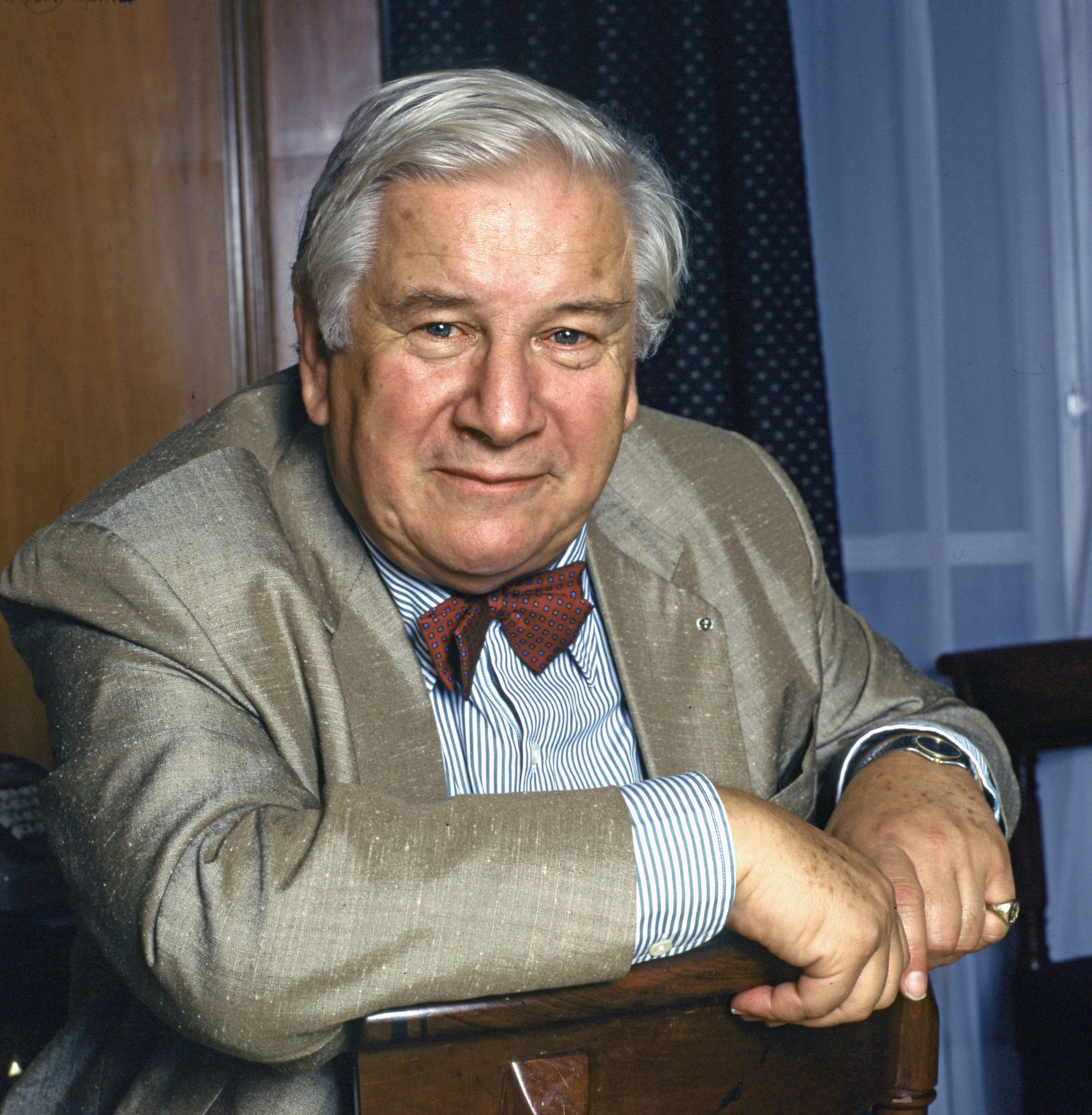
Sir Peter Ustinov

=== 1968 – Peter Ustinov ===
Served two terms

Installation: 16 October 1968

Sir Peter Ustinov – actor, writer, dramatist, diplomat and raconteur. Ustinov was the first rector of the newly independent University. Peter Freiherr von Ustinov (as he was fully styled at the time) was first elected in February 1968 after a vigorous and colourful campaign. He received 489 votes, against James Cameron's 303, Prof. C.N. Parkinson, 288, The Rev. D.C. Caskie, 272, and David Steel, MP, 183.

The turnout was high, with 1535 students voting out of an electorate of approximately 2100 students. Freiherr von Ustinov appointed Brigadier F.A. Hibberd, CBE, TD, DL, as his assessor. As rector, Ustinov moved the role from being merely a figurehead to taking on a political role, negotiating with militant students. In the February 1971 rectorial election, he narrowly defeated Michael Parkinson, the broadcaster, by 8 votes after a disputed recount. Ustinov's name was given to a room in the university's Bonar Hall, which houses a sculpture of him.

Ustinov was awarded an honorary Doctor of Laws (LL.D) degree by the university in 1969, the only rector to have received this honour during his term of office.

=== 1974 – Clement Freud, MP ===
Served two terms.

Installation: 25 October 1974

Clement Freud – writer, broadcaster, Liberal politician and Member of Parliament. He was later knighted, in the late 1980s.

He was later elected Rector of the University of St Andrews.

=== 1980 – Lord Mackie of Benshie ===
The Baron Mackie of Benshie was a Liberal (later Liberal Democrat) peer and former MP for Caithness and Sutherland. Lord Mackie of Benshie was elected in 1980. The Conservative politician, Teddy Taylor, withdrew from the race at the last minute. Mackie's seconder and campaign manager was Craig Murray, himself a future rector.

=== 1983 – Gordon Wilson, MP ===
Gordon Wilson was the Member of Parliament for Dundee East (1974 to 1987) and leader of the Scottish National Party at the time. Wilson was outspoken against government education cuts of the time. Gordon Wilson was awarded an honorary Doctor of Laws (LL.D) degree by the university in 1986. His proposer was Craig Murray.

=== 1986 – Malcolm Bruce, MP ===
Malcolm Bruce was the Liberal Democrat MP for Gordon (1983–2015), and was the president of the Liberal Club at the University of St Andrews.

=== 1989 – Paul Henderson Scott ===
Paul Henderson Scott was a Scottish cultural and historical commentator and a veteran Scottish National Party member.

=== 1992 – Stephen Fry ===
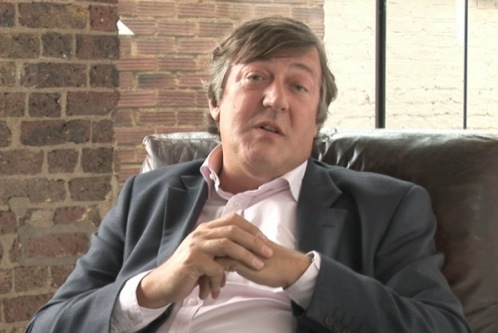
Stephen Fry

Served two terms.

Installation: 29 October 1992; 1 November 1995

Stephen Fry – comedian, author, actor and filmmaker. His rectorial address was entitled "Think of a lobster" and urged students to delay obsession with the mundane. In standing for election, he apparently declined a similar offer of nomination (made a week after Dundee's) from the students of the University of St Andrews.

The main bar in the Students' Association building is named after his novel The Liar. Fry was awarded an honorary Doctor of Laws (LL.D) degree by the university in 1995.

=== 1998 – Tony Slattery ===
Tony Slattery – actor and comedian. He was installed as rector shortly after the death of his father and following a well publicised period of mental health problems, which went on to challenge his rectorship. He found some of the demands of public events difficult to handle and eventually stopped attending the University Court meetings.

The tabloids famously carried a story about him crashing his car whilst under the influence of drugs. His explanation, to a room full of students in The Tav Bar in the DUSA building, revolved around a cat and some chemical fumes, which led to calls for his resignation.

He appointed Jason Wassell as rector's assessor who, in Tony's absence from Dundee, became his spokesperson on a number of university issues.

=== 2001 – Fred MacAulay ===
Fred MacAulay – Scottish comedian and a presenter on BBC Radio Scotland. He is a graduate (accountancy) of the university.

Stood against television presenter Richard Whiteley, Conservative Member of the Scottish Parliament Nick Johnston and Stirling University lecturer Professor Abd al-Fattah El-Awaisi. David Hasselhoff was forced to decline his nomination as he could only commit to visiting the university once a year. MacAulay was awarded an honorary Doctor of Laws (LL.D) degree by the university in 2005.

=== 2004 – Lorraine Kelly ===
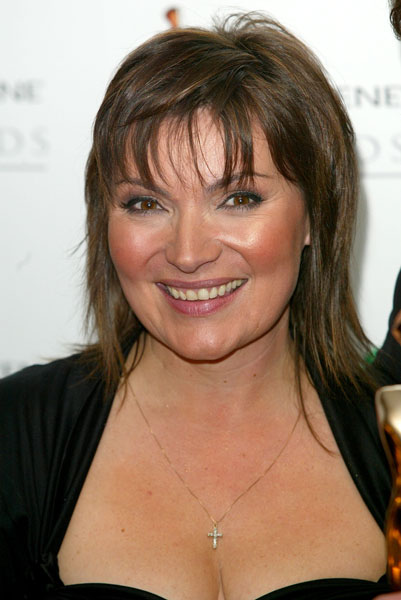
Lorraine Kelly

Election: 27 February 2004
Installation: 28 April 2004

Lorraine Kelly – East Kilbride-born television presenter. Beat Lesley Riddoch and David Shayler to the post. Lorraine Kelly was awarded honorary Doctor of Laws (LL.D) degree by the university in 2008.

=== 2007 – Craig Murray ===
Election: 16 February 2007
Installation: 26 September 2007

Craig Murray, a former British Ambassador to Uzbekistan, graduate of the university and twice president of the university's Students' Association. He resigned as an ambassador over differences with the Foreign and Commonwealth Office relating to the use of torture and extraordinary rendition in Uzbekistan. Murray was elected by students on 16 February 2007 by a vote of 632 to 582, beating competition from former Scotland rugby captain and British and Irish Lions star Andy Nicol.

The rectorial installation of Craig Murray took place on 26 September 2007 in the new Heathfield teaching building. In his Address, the new rector discussed the structure of education in Scotland, creating a university environment better adapted to the needs of undergraduates and the status of ancient university government, including a commitment to campaign for the incorporation of the position of rector at all universities in Scotland.

The University Senate refused Murray the customary honorary degree awarded to rectors on the grounds that he was not a distinguished individual.

=== 2010 – Brian Cox ===
Election: 12 February 2010

Informal Installation in Student Union: 25 October 2010 Formal Installation at Caird Hall: 17 November 2010

Brian Cox, CBE, a Dundee-born film and stage actor, who also helped to support a fundraising campaign for the university's £21million Sir James Black Centre. Cox beat Robin Harper, Green Member of the Scottish Parliament for the Lothians, and Nikolai Zhelev, a professor at the University of Abertay Dundee and the Bulgarian Honorary Consul to Dundee. Cox received 1034 votes to Harper's 315 and Zhelev's 273.

Brian Cox was re-elected unopposed in 2013. He was awarded an honorary Doctor of Laws (LL.D) degree by the university in 1993.

=== 2016 – Mark Beaumont ===
It was announced in January 2016 that cyclist Mark Beaumont had been elected unopposed in succession to Brian Cox.

=== 2019 – Jim Spence ===
In February 2019 it was announced that broadcaster Jim Spence had been chosen as the new rector in succession to Beaumont. Spence, who obtained a law degree from the university in 1986, was reported to be "more than a little surprised" but "deeply honoured" to be chosen for the post.

In March 2021 it was announced that he was to stand down as rector. He said this decision was due to "a change in his commitments" which meant that he was unable to devote enough time to supporting students. Spence was a controversial figure, coming to loggerheads with students over key issues.

=== 2021 – Keith Harris ===
A special election to replace Jim Spence was held at the end of November 2021. Artist's Manager Keith Harris defeated Mike Arnott, the secretary of the local Trades Union Council, by 101 votes to 95. An alumnus of the university, Harris is a former president of Dundee University Students' Association. He said that he wanted " to use the position to make sure that all students are positively impacted by their time at the university".

=== 2025 – Maggie Chapman ===
Green MSP Maggie Chapman was elected in 2025 in the context of a university funding shortfall and staff job losses.

== Archives ==
The university's Archive Services hold a special collection of records relating to the rectors of the university as well as the papers of Gordon Wilson and Lord Mackie of Benshie.
