= Martina Chukwuma-Ezike =

Charity Executive and former Rector of the University of Aberdeen

Martina Chukwuma-Ezike FRSA
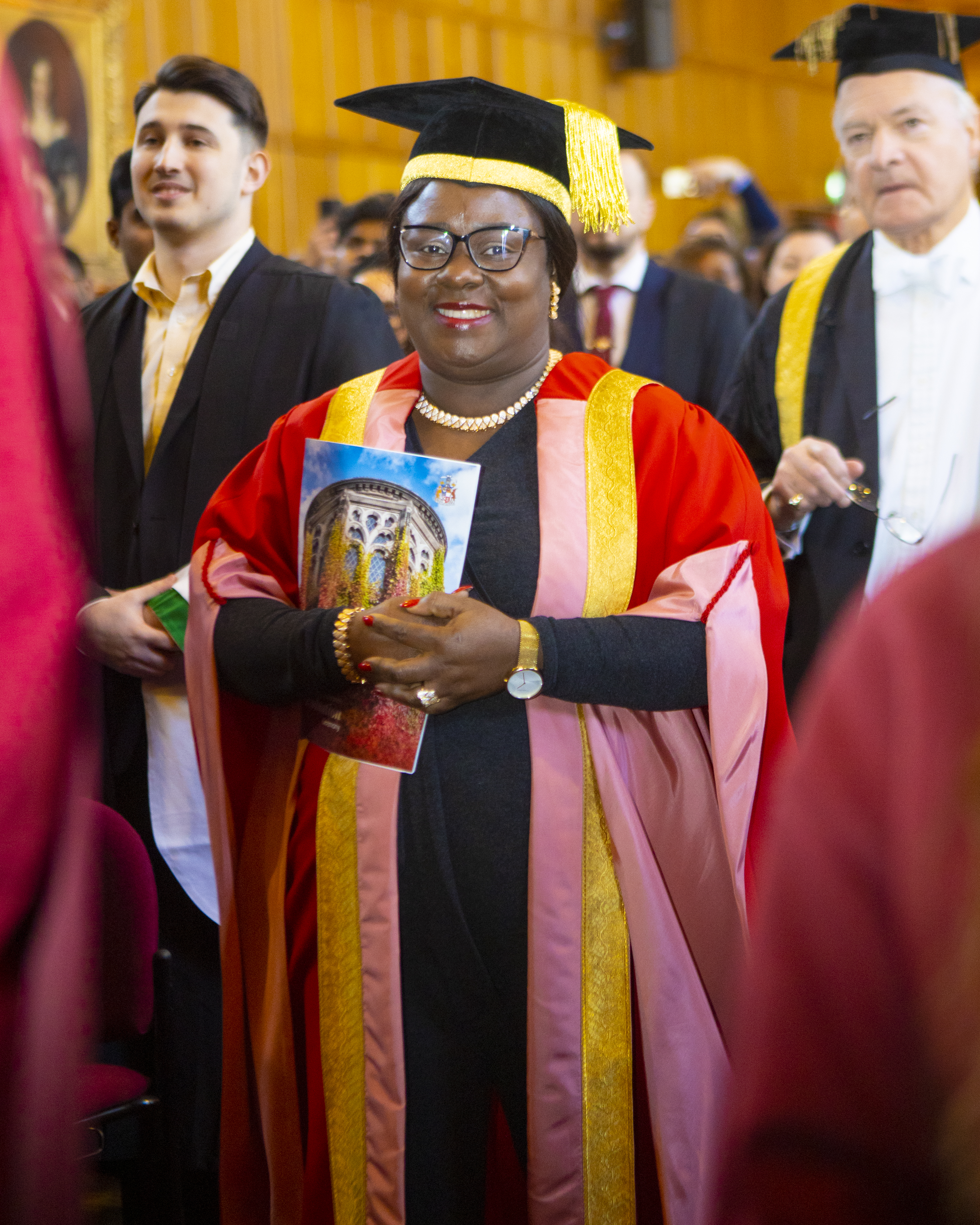

Lord Rector of the University of Aberdeen
- In office January 2022 – December 2024
- Preceded by: Maggie Chapman
- Succeeded by: Iona Fyfe

Personal details
- Born: 1981 (age 44–45) Nigeria
- Spouse(s): Uchenna Chukwuma-Ezike, married August 2011, separated January 2024.
- Education: University of Calabar (BSc); University of Aberdeen (MBA)
- Occupation: Charity Executive

Dr Martina Chukwuma-Ezike FRSA (born June 1981) is a Nigerian-born British Charity Executive, public-health and governance leader. She is the founder and Chief Executive of the Asthma and Allergy Foundation, a Scottish charity established in 2009 to support children and adults living with asthma and allergies across the UK.

In 2021, she was elected as the Lord Rector of the University of Aberdeen, Head of the University and Chairman of the University Court, the first person of colour elected to the role in the university’s history. She was installed as Rector in March 2022 and served a three-year term.

Before moving to Scotland in 2008, she worked in budget and planning at the Nigerian National Petroleum Corporation. She completed an MBA at the University of Aberdeen in 2009 and later founded the Asthma and Allergy Foundation after experiencing difficulties accessing practical support for severe asthma. She is the author of What Do You Know About Asthma, published in 2013.

Her work has focused on accredited asthma training for businesses, asthma education, patient advocacy, reducing health inequalities, organisational leadership and governance. She has won several awards and recognition for her work both in public health, higher education and senior leadership.

== Biography ==
Born Martina Kewanghe Besong Abang in June 1981 into the Prestigious Abang's family from Boki, Cross River State, Nigeria, Chukwuma-Ezike grew up in Cross River State. She first completed a diploma at the University of Calabar in social work, from 1999 to 2001, going on to study for a degree in sociology in 2002, graduating in 2005 with a B.Sc.

After briefly working for the Nigerian National Petroleum Corporation, in 2008 she moved to the United Kingdom, where the following year she attained an MBA from the University of Aberdeen.

Suffering from a severe form of asthma, known as brittle asthma, which made studying difficult for her, Chukwuma-Ezike noticed the lack of suitable support available in the Northeast of Britain, which led to her decision to found a charity separate from Asthma UK in 2009 – Asthma and Allergy Foundation, Scotland's only asthma charity, of which she is chief executive.

In 2021, Chukwuma-Ezike was elected rector of the University of Aberdeen and became the first person of colour to hold the post.

== Selected publications ==
- What do you know about asthma? (2013, Xlibris:ISBN 978-1483657752)

Academic offices
Preceded by Maggie Chapman	Rector of the University of Aberdeen; 2022 – 2024	Succeeded by Iona Fyfe
