= Keith Harris (artist manager) =

English music industry consultant and artist manager (born 1951)

Keith Harris OBE
- Born: October 1951 (age 74–75); Newcastle, England
- Education: University of Dundee
- Occupations: Music industry consultant, artist manager
- Awards: MMF Music Industry Champion, 2014
- Website: keithharrismusic.co.uk/contact.html

Keith Harris OBE (born October 1951) is an English music industry consultant and artist manager, who is the former chair of UK Music's Diversity & Equality Taskforce. Harris has worked in the music industry on both sides of the Atlantic for more than four decades as a promotions manager, including for such major companies as Transatlantic Records, EMI and Motown, and he is one of the most high-profile black executives in the business, with artists he has represented including Stevie Wonder (with whom he has worked since the 1970s), Junior Giscombe, Omar, and Lynden David Hall. Harris serves in non-executive director and board positions across multiple music charities and companies, while regularly giving talks, seminars and workshops to aiming to change perceptions and help to give young people the tools to enter the industry.

Harris was elected Rector of the University of Dundee in 2021, holding the position until 2025.

== Biography ==
Born in Newcastle, Harris grew up in Wigan, in the north of England. He was "fascinated by the world of pop music since the age of nine or 10", and learned to play the guitar, although by the time he attended Dundee University he realised that his way into the industry lay not in making the music himself: "Becoming entertainment convenor in Dundee was perfect, as in those days the university circuit was very important for bands. I would regularly book bands like Yes, Supertramp and Thin Lizzy, who all went on to global success."

Harris began working in the record industry in the mid-1970s, first employed by a UK independent label called Transatlantic Records, which represented mainly British folk musicians and also distributed the jazz labels Blue Note and Milestone Records.

He joined EMI Records in 1976 as Head of Promotions, becoming the label's General Manager in 1978. He worked for several of EMI's in-house labels, including Rocket (working on Elton John's 1976 album Blue Moves), Fantasy Records, Ariola Records, and EMI International. He then worked for two years at Motown, becoming General Manager for the label, and during this time worked with artists such as Marvin Gaye, Diana Ross, Smokey Robinson, The Commodores, Rick James, The Supremes, Thelma Houston and Stevie Wonder. Leaving Motown in 1978, he moved to Los Angeles, where he was Operations Manager for Stevie Wonder's companies.

In 1982, Harris returned to the UK and formed his own management company, managing artists including Junior Giscombe, Omar, Junior Tucker, Paul Johnson, and Lynden David Hall, while continuing to represent Stevie Wonder, with whom he has worked since 1977.

Among other roles in which Harris has served are as Chair of the Arts Council's African and Caribbean Music Circuit, Director of Performer Affairs for PPL (2006–2015), former Chair of the Music Managers Forum (MMF), as founding Chair of the European Music Managers Alliance, Chair of MusicTank, and as Chair of the Equality and Diversity Taskforce for the Music Industry. He was Senior Fellow of the University of Westminster school of music, film and fashion, lecturing there from 1993.

His trusteeships include the Universal Music Sound Foundation (formerly known as EMI Music Foundation), MIDI Music Company, the British Music Experience, and English Folk Expo. In 2007, Harris received an honorary doctorate from the University of Westminster and he was appointed an Officer of the Order of the British Empire (OBE) in the 2015 Queen's Birthday Honours for services to the music industry.

Described by Billboard magazine as a "tireless advocate for artists and campaigner for equal opportunity", Harris in June 2020 wrote an open letter on equality and racism, in response to Blackout Tuesday – the collective protest action originally organized within the music industry following the murder of George Floyd; after discussing the barriers due to prejudice that he himself had faced, Harris stated: "I would like to remind you all that this awareness of racism in the industry should not last for one day, or one week, or one year. This should last forever. I would like to see other young black people in the industry rise to the positions of authority and seniority that their talent merits. We have had many false dawns in terms of equality in the industry, let's make sure that this is not another one."

In 2021, Harris was elected Rector of the University of Dundee. serving in the position until he was succeeded by Maggie Chapman in August 2025.

== Awards and recognition ==
- Music Managers Forum (MMF) British Music Roll of Honour.
- Honorary doctorate from the University of Westminster, November 2007.
- MMF Music Industry Champion, 2014.
- Officer of the Order of the British Empire (OBE), 2015.
