= Maggie Chapman =

Scottish Greens politician

Maggie Chapman MSP
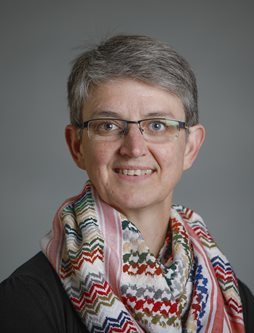
- Official portrait, 2026

Member of the Scottish Parliament for North East Scotland (1 of 7 Regional MSPs)
- Incumbent
- Assumed office 6 May 2021

Co-Convenor of the Scottish Greens
- In office 25 November 2013 – 1 August 2019 Serving with Patrick Harvie
- Preceded by: Martha Wardrop
- Succeeded by: Lorna Slater (as Co-leader)

Councillor, City of Edinburgh Council
- In office 3 May 2007 – June 2015
- Constituency: Leith Walk

Scottish Green portfolios
- 2026–: Justice
- 2021–2026: Justice, Equality and Human Rights

Lord Rector of the University of Aberdeen
- In office April 2015 – 31 March 2021
- Preceded by: Maitland Mackie
- Succeeded by: Martina Chukwuma-Ezike

Rector of the University of Dundee
- Incumbent
- Assumed office 1 August 2025
- Preceded by: Keith Harris

Personal details
- Born: 27 June 1979 (age 47) Salisbury, Zimbabwe Rhodesia (now Harare, Zimbabwe)
- Party: Scottish Greens
- Education: Dominican Convent School, Harare; University of Edinburgh; University of Stirling
- Occupation: Politician and lecturer
- Profession: Teacher
- Website: www.maggiechapman.scot

Maggie Chapman (born 27 June 1979) is a Scottish politician and lecturer who is a Scottish Green Member of the Scottish Parliament (MSP) for North East Scotland. She was co-convenor of the Scottish Greens from November 2013 to August 2019, serving with Patrick Harvie, and was the party's lead candidate for the 2019 European election.

Born and raised in Zimbabwe, Chapman moved to Scotland to study Zoology at the University of Edinburgh, graduating in 2001. She was a councillor for the Leith Walk ward of The City of Edinburgh Council from 2007 to 2015 and represented the Scottish Greens on the Smith Commission for further devolution of powers to the Scottish Parliament. She was the lead Green candidate for the North East region at the 2021 Scottish Parliament election, and was elected as one of eight Green MSPs.

Chapman was the Rector of the University of Aberdeen, having been elected in 2014, and again in 2018. Her term ended on 31 March 2021. Since 1 August 2025, she has been Rector of the University of Dundee.

== Early life and education ==
Chapman was born in 1979 in Salisbury, Zimbabwe Rhodesia shortly before the nation’s independence. Her family had moved from South Africa in 1978 for her father to take up the post of director at the college of music. She grew up there, educated at a mixed-race school, with the country having achieved independence from the United Kingdom as the Republic of Zimbabwe while she was a baby. Her mother was a nurse who worked as a theatre sister and midwife.

Chapman moved to Scotland to study Zoology at the University of Edinburgh, graduating in 2001. She went on to complete a master's degree in Environmental Management at the University of Stirling in 2003, then returned to Edinburgh University to study for a PhD in Geography. In 2015, she clarified that she had not completed her doctoral studies. As a student, she had been an activist for Edinburgh University Students' Association.

== Professional life ==
Chapman has worked in the west of Scotland in Environmental Management, and as a community carer throughout Edinburgh.

Until June 2015, she was a lecturer in cultural geography, environmental ethics and social justice at Edinburgh Napier University. She retains a role in teaching through her support for the Educational Institute of Scotland.

In mid-2015, she took up a post at the Muslim Women's Resource Centre in Dundee.

== Political career ==
Chapman was first elected as a councillor for the Leith Walk ward in the 2007 City of Edinburgh Council election, becoming one of the three first Green councillors in Edinburgh. She was re-elected in 2012. Later that year she became the first ever convener of the council's Petitions Committee. During her time as a councillor, Chapman has advocated for causes that include: the living wage, participatory budgeting, better private tenancy rights, and better support for non-profits. She has also organised and voted against the privatisation of council services and cuts to services. In June 2015, she announced she was standing down as a councillor, to concentrate on the Scottish Parliament election that was to be held in May 2016. She was selected as the party's lead candidate for the North East region.

In November 2013, she was elected unopposed as the Scottish Greens' female co-convenor, succeeding Glasgow councillor Martha Wardrop, and was re-elected to the position in 2016.

Chapman was the party's lead candidate in the 2014 European Parliament election in the United Kingdom for the Scotland constituency. She was not elected.

Chapman is a socialist, environmentalist, anti-cuts activist, peace activist and feminist. She has been active in a number of political campaigns, including the Radical Independence Campaign.

In September 2014, Chapman became a member of the Smith Commission into further devolution for the Scottish Parliament.

In 2015, Chapman was challenged as co-convenor by activist Zara Kitson in the party's internal elections. Kitson was second on the party list for Glasgow in the 2016 Scottish Parliament election and was nominated by former MSP Mark Ruskell and endorsed by MSP and former convenor Alison Johnstone. The election was notable as it was the first time an incumbent co-convenor faced a serious challenge, all to date had been re-elected as the sole nominees.

Chapman stood in the 2016 Scottish Parliament election as the party's lead candidate for the North East region but despite the Greens increasing their number of MSPs from two to six, Chapman was not elected.

In 2019, she was once again selected as the party's lead candidate for the European Parliament election for the Scotland constituency. She was not elected.

At the 2019 Scottish Green leadership election, Chapman lost to Lorna Slater.

=== Member of the Scottish Parliament ===
In the 2021 Scottish Parliament election, Chapman led the North East regional list for the Scottish Greens. Her successful election to Holyrood was announced on 8 May 2021, two days after the election. This made her the first Green MSP in the North East since Shiona Baird lost her seat in 2007. Upon being sworn in, Chapman repeated her affirmation in Shona. She was the Scottish Greens' spokesperson for Justice, Equality and Human Rights.

In 2023, Chapman was criticised for comments she made during a discussion on gender recognition reform with broadcaster LBC. The MSP said she agreed with children as young as 8 being allowed to make their own decision about whether to legally change their gender.

In July 2025, the Scottish Greens published their candidates for the regional lists at the 2026 Scottish Parliament election. For the North East Scotland region, Chapman was moved down to second place, effectively deselecting her. Guy Ingerson was chosen to be the lead Green candidate for the region. She was ultimately put first on the list again in March 2026 after Ingerson was barred from running.

Chapman was re-elected during the 2026 Scottish Parliament election with 30,028 votes (9.8%), as one of seven regional list members for North East Scotland. She is currently the Scottish Greens' spokesperson for Justice.

== Rector ==
In November 2014, she was elected as Rector of the University of Aberdeen after a vote by the student body of the University. She was installed as rector at a ceremony in March 2015, having intimated that she would be active in the role.

Chapman ran for a second term in November 2017, but the election was annulled after allegations that her supporters had torn down posters belonging to rival candidates, which Chapman and her campaign team denied. A document released by the University indicated that the election committee disagreed with the initial decision to annul the results as Chapman had not been given a right of reply to the allegations but did not overturn it. In the end, the election was re-run in February 2018. Chapman won re-election, defeating Aberdeen law student Israr Khan by a margin of 1,248 votes to 891.

In March 2025, Chapman was elected to become rector of the University of Dundee, amidst a funding crisis for the university.

== Controversies ==
=== Failure to declare financial interest ===
On 10 May 2023, Chapman was sanctioned after the standards committee found she had failed to declare a financial interest during an evidence session on the Gender Recognition Reform Bill.

=== Response to 2023 Hamas attack on Israel ===
In October 2023, Chapman tweeted that the Hamas attack on Israel, which killed 1,300 and took more hostage, was "decolonisation", not "terrorism". She deleted her post after facing criticism. The party's co-leader Lorna Slater said "she did not support the initial statement".

=== Comments on the UK Supreme Court ===
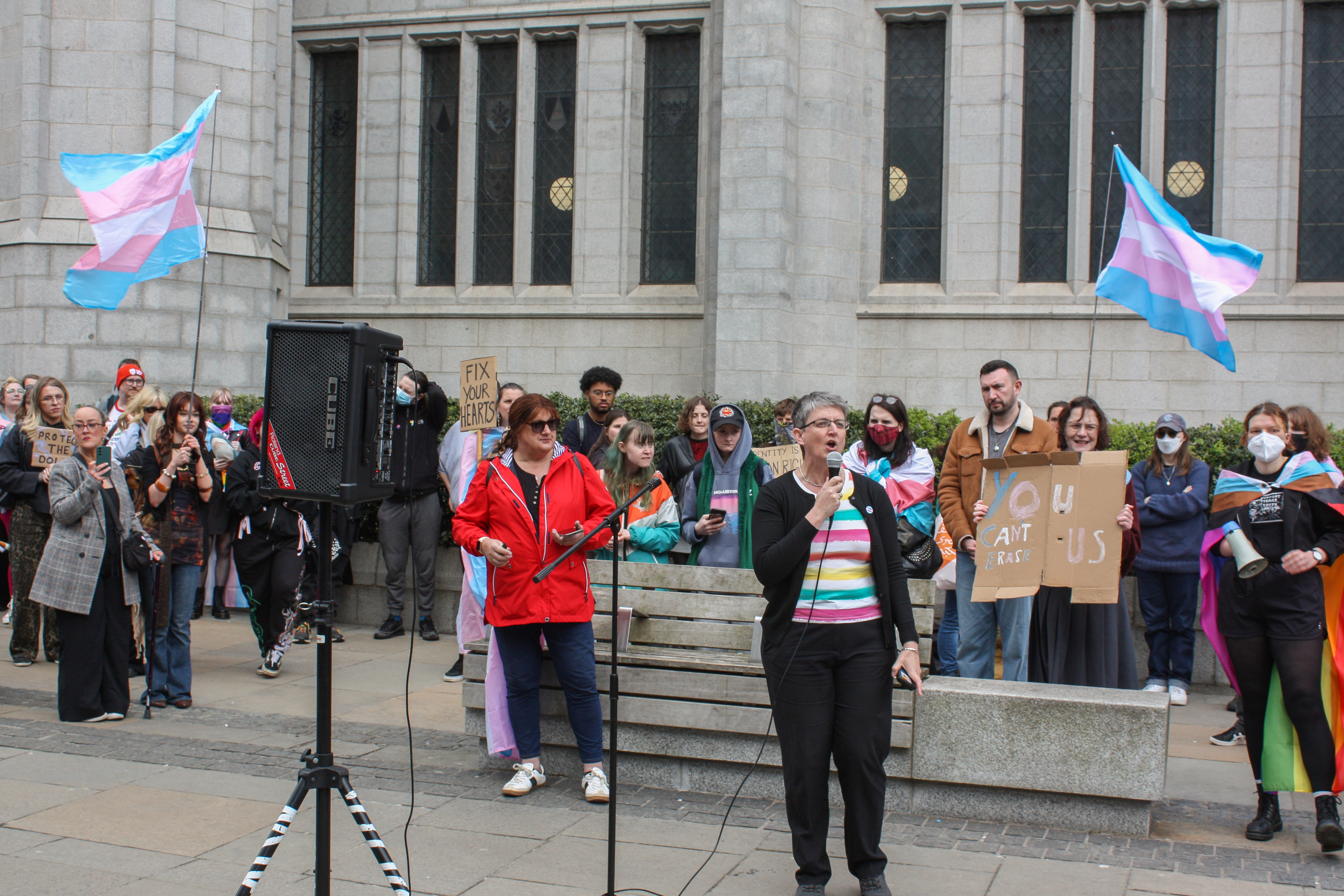
Chapman speaking at a Transgender rights protest at Marischal College, 2025

In April 2025, in the aftermath of the Supreme Court's judgement in the case of For Women Scotland Ltd v The Scottish Ministers, which stated that a woman is defined by biological sex under UK equality law, Chapman attended a transgender rights rally in Aberdeen where she was filmed condemning the ruling. Chapman denounced what she called "bigotry, prejudice and hatred coming from the Supreme Court". Chapman's comments were denounced by the Faculty of Advocates, which described them as failing to "respect the rule of law", and constituting "an egregious breach of Ms Chapman's duties to uphold the continued independence of the judiciary". In a letter to the Equalities, Human Rights and Civil Justice Committee – of which Chapman is deputy convener – Roddy Dunlop KC called her comments "outrageous" and said that they created a risk of danger to members of the Supreme Court, and called for an apology and for Chapman to consider her position. Chapman stood by her comments and refused to apologise, saying that institutions and laws reflect transphobia and prejudice in society. On 29 April, a motion in the Committee to remove Chapman as deputy convener was rejected by four votes to three after SNP MSPs sided with Chapman. Two Conservatives and one Labour member voted in favour of removing her.

=== Bullying allegations ===
In June 2025, Guy Ingerson, who had previously worked for Chapman, made a bullying complaint against her to the Scottish Greens. She had reportedly contacted Ingerson's place of work to tell his new employer that he was "untrustworthy", and should be "watched".

In March 2026, when Ingerson was barred from running for the Scottish Parliament, Ingerson accused Chapman of running a "two-year long campaign of bullying, lies, rumours and smears" in order to have him removed as a candidate. Chapman was re-vetted due to the ongoing complaint against her, but was ultimately allowed to remain as a candidate. In response, Esme Houston – now second on the list after Chapman – called for an extraordinary general meeting on Ingerson's barring and a petition was launched by Scottish Greens members in support of holding the EGM.

== Personal life ==
Her father, Neil Chapman, was a professional classical musician. She has a sister, Catherine. She plays the fiddle and enjoys exploring Scotland.

Party political offices
Preceded by Martha Wardrop	Co-Convener of the Scottish Green Party; 2013–2019; With: Patrick Harvie	Succeeded by Lorna Slater
Academic offices
Preceded by Maitland Mackie	Rector of the University of Aberdeen; 2014 – 2021	Succeeded by Martina Chukwuma-Ezike
Preceded by Keith Harris	Rector of the University of Dundee; 2025 – present	Incumbent
