= Iona Fyfe =

Scottish singer

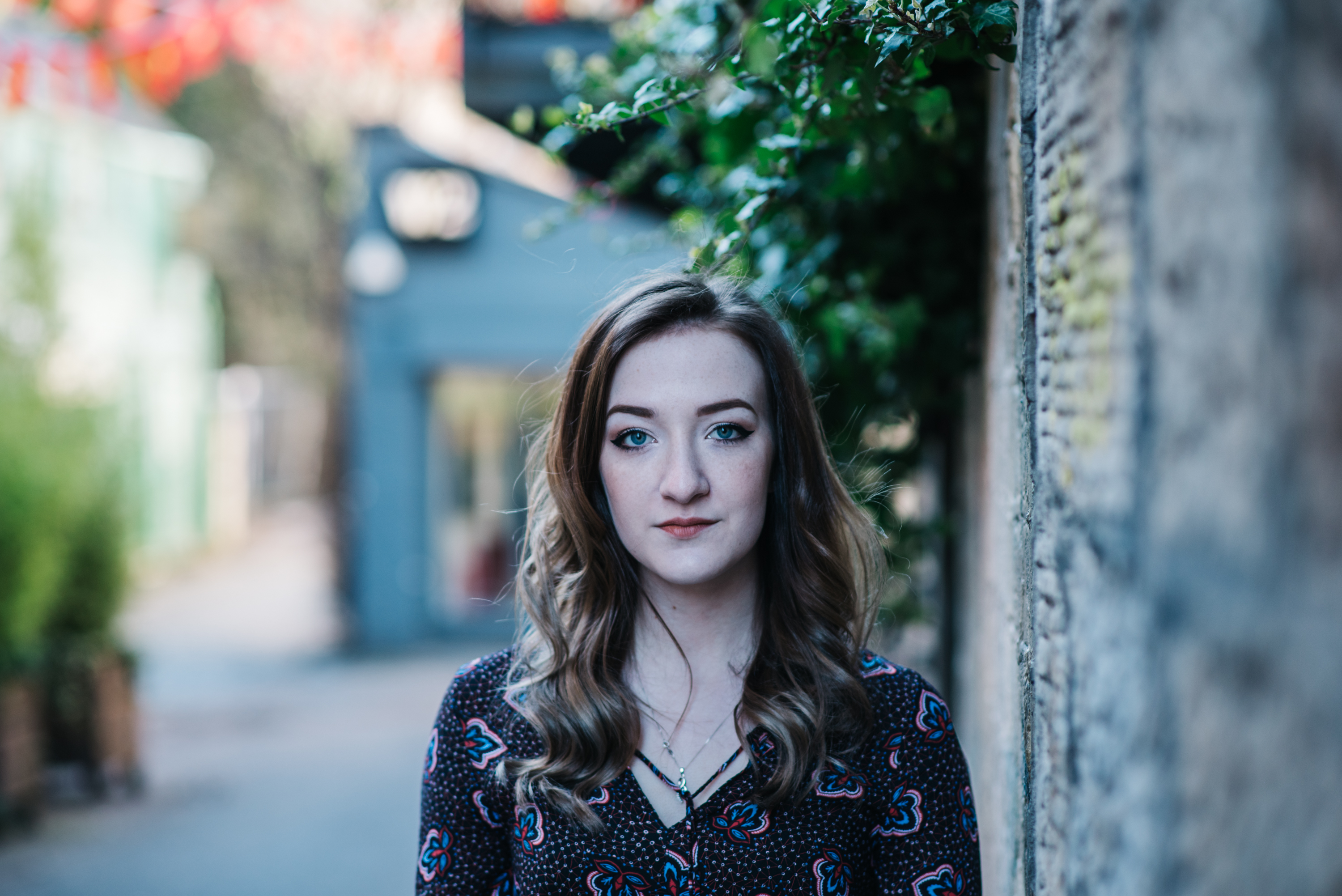
- Fyfe in 2017

Lord Rector of the University of Aberdeen
- Incumbent
- Assumed office January 2025
- Preceded by: Martina Chukwuma-Ezike

Personal details
- Born: 16 January 1998 (age 28) Huntly, Aberdeenshire, Scotland
- Education: Royal Conservatoire of Scotland
- Musical career
- Genres: Scottish folk music Doric folk music
- Occupations: Folk singer-songwriter Multi-instrumentalist
- Instruments: Vocals, piano
- Years active: 2012–present
- Label: Cairnie Records
- Website: ionafyfe.com

Iona Fyfe (born 16 January 1998) is a Scottish folk singer from Huntly, Aberdeenshire. In 2016, she was a semi-finalist for the BBC Radio 2 Young Folk Award and, in 2017 and 2021, was a finalist for the BBC Radio Scotland Young Traditional Musician award.

In 2018, she won "Scots Singer of the Year" at the MG ALBA Scots Trad Music Awards. In 2019, she won "Young Scots Speaker o the Year" at the inaugural Scots Language Awards, winning "Scots Performer o the Year" in the 2020 Awards, and "Scots Speaker o the Year" in the 2021 Awards.

She has advocated for official recognition of the Scots language, successfully petitioning Spotify to add Scots to their list of languages.

Fyfe is a National Director of the Traditional Music and Song Association and serves as a committee member of the Musicians' Union Scotland.

In November 2024, Fyfe was elected as the Rector of the University of Aberdeen and took up the three-year position in January 2025.

== Biography ==
Fyfe was born on 16 January 1998 and was raised in Huntly. She started learning poems in the Doric dialect of Scots as a child. She spent time in her youth in the company of bothy balladers such as Jock Duncan, Joe Aitken, and Geordie Murison, people that Fyfe considers to be her "adoptive family". After singing folk songs and bothy ballads, Fyfe auditioned to join the Royal Conservatoire of Scotland at the age of 16, being accepted. She graduated in 2019 with a First Class Honours degree in Traditional Music.

Fyfe is a communications officer of Scots language advocacy group Oor Vyce, and often speaks about getting Scots to be a "legal language". Her work in promoting the Scots language was recognised with awards from the Scots Language Awards in 2019, 2020 and 2021.

In January 2025 Fyfe commenced a three-year term as Rector of Aberdeen University.

== Music ==
Fyfe sings in the Iona Fyfe Trio. Her music has been played on BBC Radio Scotland, BBC Radio 2, and BBC Radio nan Gàidheal. Her country and western choice was inspired by north east Scotland singer Jane Turriff, who recorded an album of country and western covers.

Her first solo album, Away From My Window, was recorded with guests Tim Edey and Luc McNally.

In December 2020, Fyfe released a Scots version of Christina Rossetti's In the Bleak Midwinter. Unable to choose Scots as a language for her song's metadata, she petitioned Spotify to add Scots to the available languages descriptions. In March 2021, Spotify added Scots to their list.

In 2016, Fyfe was a semi-finalist of the BBC Radio 2 Young Folk Award. In 2017 and 2021, she was a finalist of the BBC Radio Scotland Young Traditional Musician award. Also in 2017, she won the Molloy Award. In 2018, she won "Scots Singer of the Year" at the MG ALBA Scots Trad Music Awards.

In January 2021, Fyfe signed a petition opposing the UK government's plans to exclude professional musicians from their list of workers permitted to enter the EU without a visa, claiming the plans would make touring Europe "financially unviable".

In April 2021, Fyfe released a rendition of "The Northern Lights", the unofficial anthem of Aberdeen F.C., after being commissioned by the club.

== Political views and activism ==
Fyfe supports an independent Scottish republic. "Coming from Aberdeenshire, I completely understand the draw and intrigue of the royal family, but cannot possibly stand by and support this whilst many families in the region struggle to afford to live. The monarchy is outdated and not fit for purpose."

Fyfe has been active in campaigning for wider recognition of the Scots language. She is a committee member of Oor Vyce, a campaign group which successfully lobbied for the Scots language to be an officially recognised language within Scotland in 2025.

In addition to her campaigning for Scots language recognition, Fyfe has also been vocal in speaking out about the treatment of women within the traditional folk music scene, discussing in interviews her own experiences of exploitation and sexual harassment within the industry. In 2022 she was awarded the Equality Award by the STUC in recognition of her advocacy work on behalf of women in the industry.

== Discography ==
2015: The First Sangs
2016: East EP
2018: Away From My Window (Cairnie Records)
2019: Dark Turn of Mind (Cairnie Records)

== Awards ==
2017 – Molloy Award
2018 – Scots Singer of the Year - MG ALBA Scots Trad Music Awards
2019 – Young Scots Speaker o the Year - Scots Language Awards
2020 – Scots Performer o the Year - Scots Language Awards
2021 – Scots Speaker o the Year - Scots Language Awards
2021 – Musician of the Year - MG ALBA Scots Trad Music Awards
2022 – Equality Award - Scottish Trade Union Congress
2023 – Scots Singer of the Year - MG ALBA Scots Trad Music Awards

Academic offices
Preceded by Martina Chukwuma-Ezike	Rector of the University of Aberdeen; 2025 – present	Incumbent
