= List of principals of the University of Aberdeen =

University head position

Principal of the University of Aberdeen
- Incumbent; Professor Pete Edwards since 1 November 2025
- Member of: General Council; University Court; Senatus Academicus
- Appointer: Appointed by the University Court
- Constituting instrument: Universities (Scotland) Act 1858
- First holder: Reverend Peter Colin Campbell (University of Aberdeen); Hector Boece (King's College); Robert Howie (Marischal College)
- Website: www.abdn.ac.uk/about/management/smt/

The principal of the University of Aberdeen is the working administrative head of the University of Aberdeen, acting as its chief executive. He is responsible for the overall running of the university, presiding over the main academic body of the university, the Senatus Academicus. The principal is normally also created vice-chancellor of the university, enabling him to perform the functions reserved to the chancellor of the university in the latter's absence, such as the awarding of degrees.

== History ==
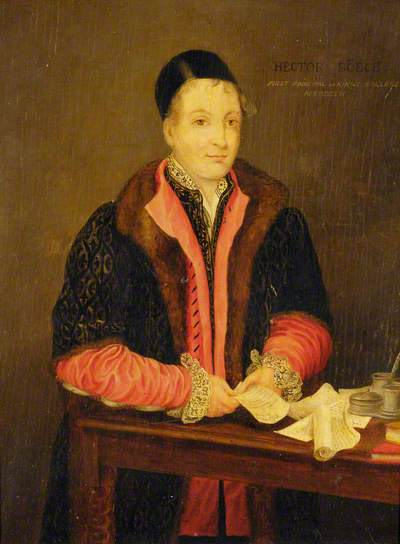
Hector Boece, the first Principal of King's College, Aberdeen, installed in 1500

The present office of principal dates to 1858 with the passage of the Universities (Scotland) Act 1858. The position was created with the amalgamation of the two existing ancient universities in Aberdeen, King's College (est. 1495) and Marischal College (est. 1593) in 1860, which had previously appointed their own individual principals. The installation is presided by the Chancellor of the university.

Professor Pete Edwards succeeded George Boyne as principal on 1 November 2025.

== List of principals of the University of Aberdeen ==
List of principals
No.	Principal	Term of office	Notes
1	Peter Colin Campbell	1865–1876	First principal of the newly merged university, died in post
2	William Robinson Pirie	1876–1885	Died in post
3	Sir William Duguid Geddes	1885–1900	Died in post
4	John Marshall Lang	1900–1909	Died in post
5	Sir George Adam Smith	1909–1935	
6	Sir William Hamilton Fyfe	1936–1948	
7	Sir Thomas Murray Taylor	1948–1962	Died in post
8	Sir Edward Maitland Wright	1962–1976	
9	Sir Fraser Noble	1976–1981	
10	George Paul McNicol	1981–1991	
11	Maxwell Irvine	1991–1996	
12	Sir Duncan Rice	1996–2010	
13	Sir Ian Diamond	2010–2018	
14	George Boyne	2018–2025	
15	Peter Edwards	2025–present	

== List of principals of former constituent colleges ==
=== Principals of King's College, Aberdeen ===
List of principals
No.	Principal	Term of office	Notes
1	Hector Boece	1500–1534	
2	Alexander Anderson	<1561–1569	Principal from at least 1561, deposed in 1569
3	Alexander Arbuthnot	1569–1583	Died in post
4	Reverend David Rait	1598–1632	Died in post
5	William Leslie	1632–1640	Expelled from post by covenanters.
6	William Guild	1640–1651	
7	John Row	1652–1661	
8	Alexander Middleton	1662–1679	
9	George Middleton	1689–1716	
10	George Chalmers	1729–????	
11	John Chalmers	????–1800	Held position for 'nearly threescore years', died in post
12	Roderick MacLeod	1800–1815	Previously sub-principal, died in post
13	William Jack	1815–1854	Died in post; subsequently left unfilled due to impending merger

=== Principals of Marischal College ===
List of principalsSource:
No.	Principal	Term of office	Notes
1	Robert Howie	1593–1598	Later principal of St Mary's College, St Andrews
2	Gilbert Gray	1598–1614	Died in post
3	David Wedderburn	1614–1615	Possibly, interim
4	Andrew Adie	1616–1620	Forced to resign by town council
5	William Forbes	1620–1621	Later the first Bishop of Edinburgh
6	Patrick Dun	1621–1649	Resigned
7	William Moir	1649–1661	Resigned
8	James Leslie	1661–1678	Died in post
9	Robert Paterson	1678–1717	Dismissed due to Jacobite sympathies
10	Thomas Blackwell (primus)	1717–1728	Father of secundus, died in post
11	John Osborne	1728–1748	Died in post
12	Thomas Blackwell (secundus)	1748–1757	Son of primus, died in post
13	Robert Pollock	1757–1759	Died in post
14	George Campbell	1759–1795	Retired in 1795, died following year
15	William Laurence Brown	1796–1830	Died in post
16	Daniel Dewar	1832–1860	Final principal of Marischal College before it merged with King's College, subsequently retired

== See also ==
- Chancellor of the University of Aberdeen
- Rector of the University of Aberdeen
- Ancient university governance in Scotland
