= Duncan Liddel =

Scottish mathematician, physician and astronomer (1561–1613)

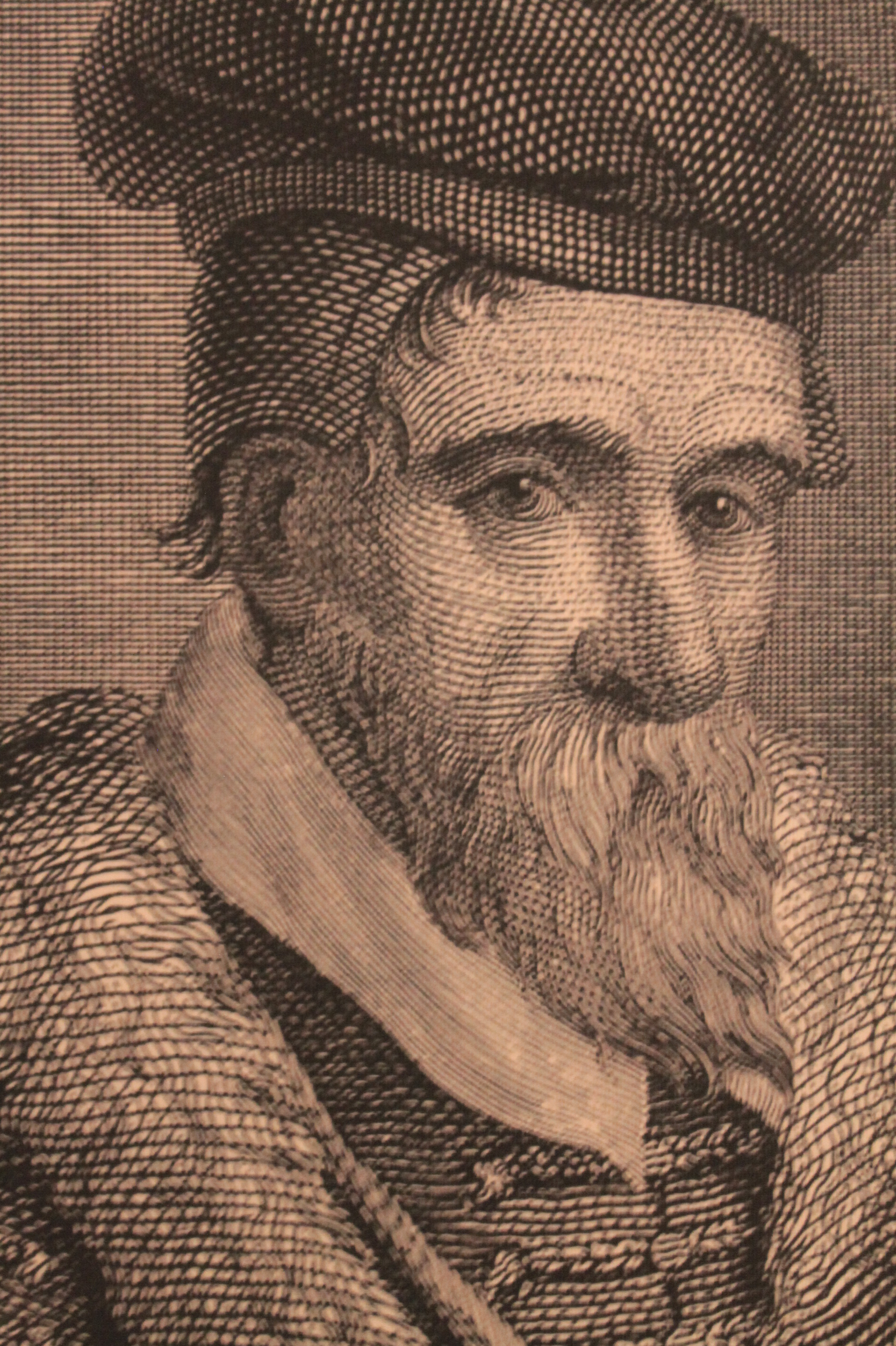
Contemporary engraving of Duncan Liddel c.1600

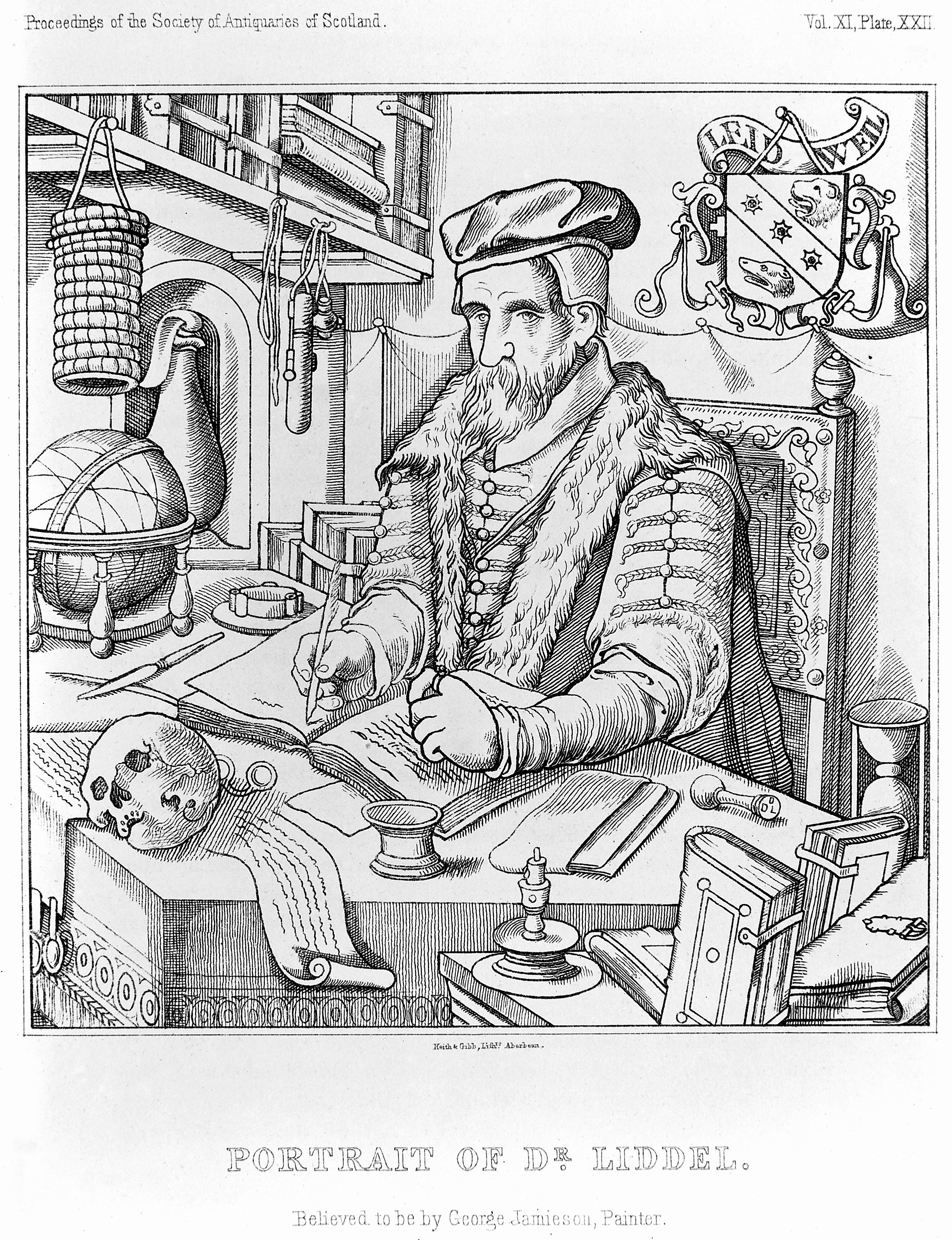
Duncan Liddel

Duncan Liddel (also Duncan Liddell; 1561 – 17 December 1613) was a Scottish mathematician, physician and astronomer.

== Life ==
Liddel was born in Aberdeen, Scotland. Having received an education in languages and philosophy at the local school and the University of Aberdeen, he went abroad at age 18. Moving to Gdańsk in Polish Prussia first, he arrived after a few months at the Viadrina European University (Frankfurt (Oder)), where a Scot, John Craig was teaching logic and mathematics; Craig superintended his studies.

Three years later Craig returned to Scotland to become physician to King James VI, and Liddel, on his advice, moved to Breslau in Silesia, where he studied mathematics under Paul Wittich, and encountered Andreas Dudith. In 1584 he returned to Frankfurt, took pupils in mathematics and philosophy, and took up the study of physic. In 1587 an epidemic drove him to the University of Rostock in Mecklenburg, where he became the friend of Johannes Caselius, Heinrich Brucaeus and Cornelius Martini; and received the degree of M.A. in philosophy. With the help of his new contacts, he visited Tycho Brahe in Ven in 1587 and again the following year.

Shortly after his return to Frankfurt in 1590, Liddel joined the new University of Helmstedt established by Duke Julius of Brunswick-Wolfenbüttel. Caselius had already been appointed to the chair of philosophy there. Next year Liddel obtained the lower mathematical chair vacated by Franciscus Parcovius, and in 1594 he succeeded Erhardus Hoffmann in the higher mathematical chair. In 1596 he became M.D. of the university, and began publicly to teach physic and to act as præses at the recitation of medical dissertations. In 1599 he was dean of the faculty of philosophy; in 1603 he resigned his mathematical professorship, and in 1604 became pro-rector of the university.

Liddel returned to Scotland in 1607, financially secure. In 1612 he endowed the university of Aberdeen with lands for the education and support of six poor scholars; and in 1613 he endowed a professorship of mathematics in Marischal College, the holder of which was known as the Duncan Liddel Professor of Mathematics. He died in Aberdeen on 17 December 1613, at age 51. His funeral sermon was given by Gilbert Gray of Marischal College.

== Legacy ==
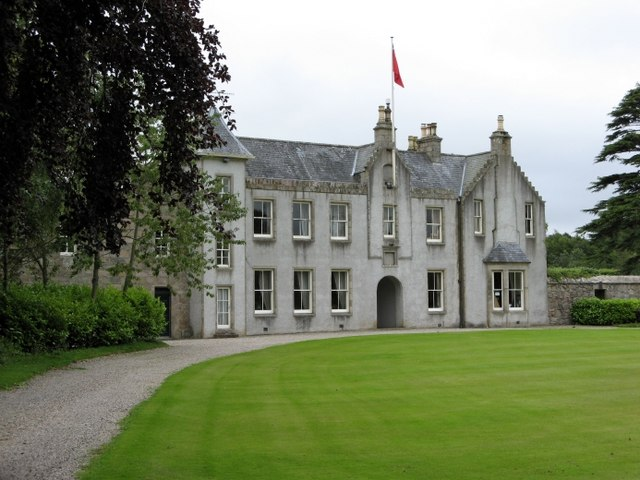
Pitmedden House

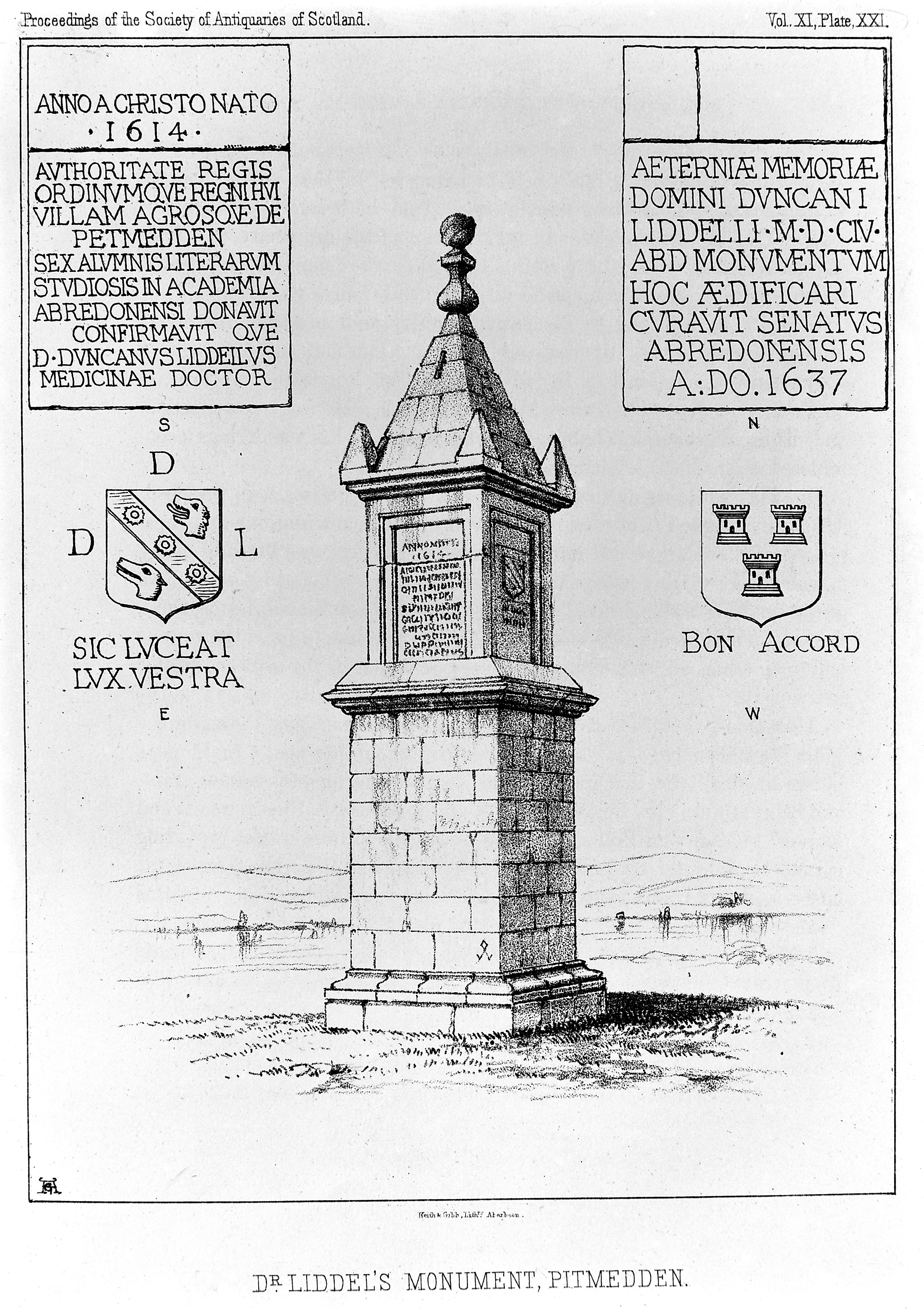
Memorial to Duncan Liddel in Pitmedden Estate, Dyce

Liddel bequeathed his books and instruments to Marischal College. A brass memorial figure of him was later set up in the Kirk of St Nicholas, Aberdeen.

Liddel bought the Pitmedden estate from the Leslie family around 1600. A substantial part of the Pitmedden estate was also gifted to the university, with the residue passing to Duncan's brother Peter Liddell in May 1614.

== Memorial ==
A four-sided memorial, the Liddel Monument, was erected on the Pitmedden estate in 1637 by the Senatus of Aberdeen to Liddell's memory. Now located south-east of Pitmedden railway station.

== Reputation ==
Liddel was reputed as a mathematician in Germany, where he was said to have been the first to teach the astronomy of Copernicus and of Tycho Brahe side by side with the Ptolemaic system. Caselius considered that Liddel was the first teacher of Brahe's system; and Brahe complained of plagiarism.

In theology, also, Liddel built a reputation. He found arguments against the Lutheran theologian Daniel Hofmann, who had deployed the doctrine of double truth at Helmstedt in a divisive fashion.

== Works ==
Liddel wrote medical books:

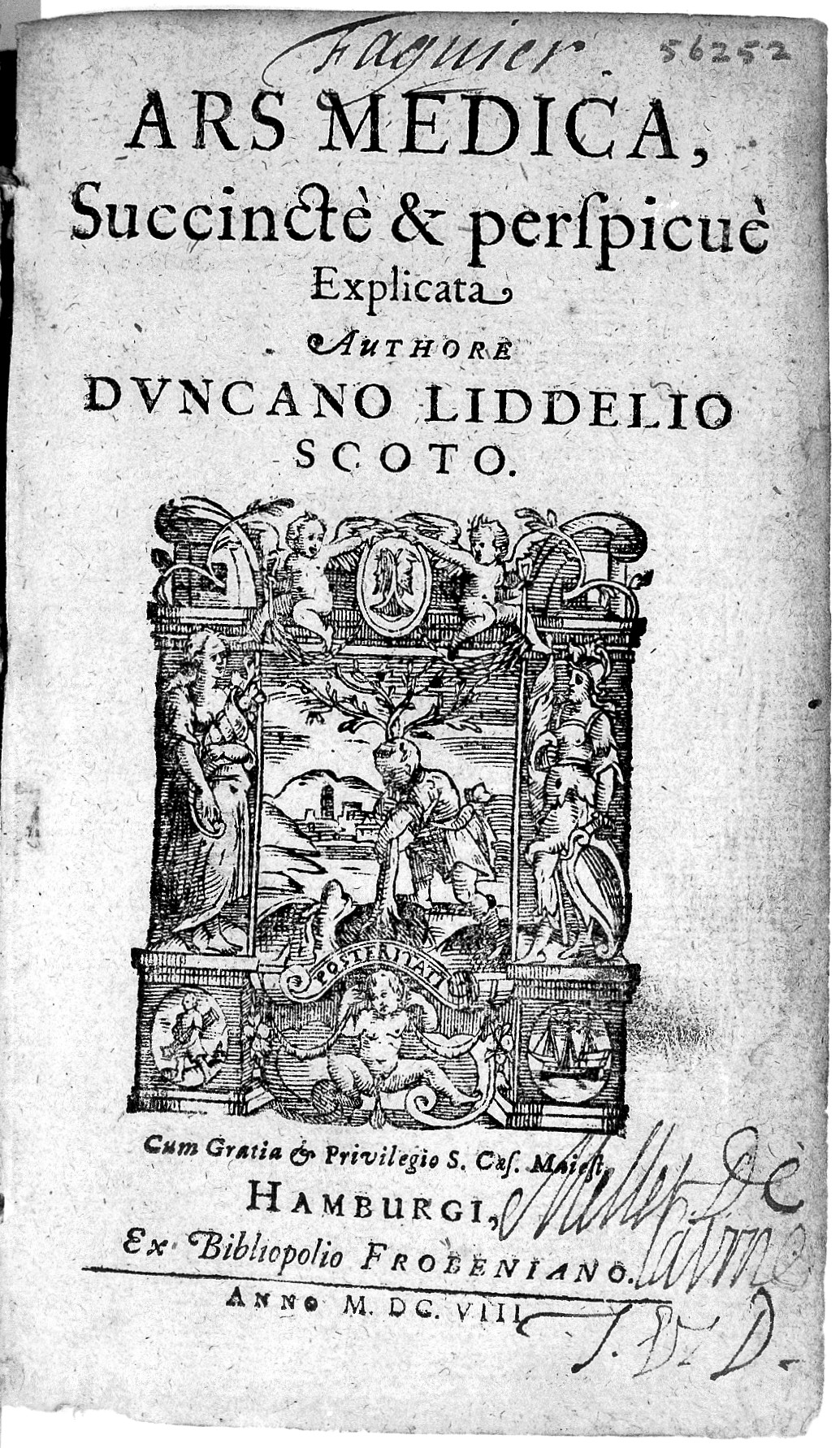
Title page from Ars medica (1608) by Duncan Liddel

- Disputationum Medicinalium Liber, Helmstadt, 1605; medical theses maintained by himself and his pupils, 1592–1605: the volume is dedicated to John Craig. A posthumous edition, under the title Universæ Medicinæ Compendium, was published at Helmstadt in 1720.
- Ars Medica, Hamburg, 1608, in five books—I. De Medicinæ Definitione et Principiis; II. De Physiologia; III. De Pathologia; IV. De Signorum Doctrina; V. De Therapeutica:’]—dedicated to James I of England. Another edition was published at Lyon in 1624 by Serranus; and in 1628 a third edition appeared at Hamburg. This and the next work were in the Galenic tradition of learned medicine, but admitted some Paracelsian doctrines.
- De Febribus Libri tres, Hamburg, 1610; republished by Serranus with the Ars Medica in 1624.
- Tractatus de Dente Aureo, Hamburg, 1628, an exposure of a supposed miracle—a boy having a golden tooth—which had imposed on the credulity of Gregor Horstius.
- Artis Conservandi Sanitatem Libri duo, Aberdeen, 1651; edited by Patrick Dun.

== Notes ==
Attribution

- This article incorporates text from a publication now in the public domain: Lee, Sidney, ed. (1893). "Liddel, Duncan". Dictionary of National Biography. Vol. 33. London: Smith, Elder & Co.
