= List of listed buildings in Foveran, Aberdeenshire =

This is a list of listed buildings in the parish of Foveran in Aberdeenshire, Scotland.

== List ==
Name	Location	Date Listed	Grid Ref. (Note: Sometimes known as OSGB36, the grid reference (where provided) is based on the British national grid reference system used by the Ordnance Survey. • "Guide to National Grid". Ordnance Survey. • "Get-a-map". Ordnance Survey.)	Geo-coordinates	Notes	LB Number (Note: Historic Environment Scotland assign a unique alphanumeric identifier to each designated site in Scotland, for listed buildings this always begins with "LB", for example "LB12345".)	Image
Foveran House				57°18′32″N 2°00′57″W	Category B	9168	Upload another image
Knockhall Castle				57°19′43″N 2°00′43″W	Category B	9171	Upload Photo
Newburgh House Main Street				57°18′55″N 2°00′17″W	Category B	9174	Upload Photo
Udny Family Vault, Old Churchyard, Newburgh				57°19′17″N 1°59′48″W	Category B	9175	Upload Photo
Foveran House Lodge, Gates And Gatepiers				57°18′27″N 2°01′33″W	Category C(S)	9170	Upload Photo
Ythan Lodge				57°19′43″N 2°00′31″W	Category B	9172	Upload Photo
Newburgh Village, Main Street And School Road, Holyrood Chapel				57°19′02″N 2°00′13″W	Category B	6797	Upload another image
Tillery House				57°17′47″N 2°08′34″W	Category B	9176	Upload Photo
Mill Of Foveran, Farmhouse				57°18′23″N 2°02′32″W	Category B	9169	Upload Photo
Foveran Parish Church Turing Slab				57°18′28″N 2°01′36″W	Category A	9166	Upload Photo
Shanghai, 31 Main Street, Newburgh				57°19′04″N 2°00′14″W	Category B	9173	Upload Photo
Foveran Parish Church				57°18′28″N 2°01′36″W	Category B	9165	Upload another image
Foveran Churchyard				57°18′28″N 2°01′35″W	Category C(S)	9167	Upload Photo

== Key ==
The scheme for classifying buildings in Scotland is:

- Category A: "buildings of national or international importance, either architectural or historic; or fine, little-altered examples of some particular period, style or building type."
- Category B: "buildings of regional or more than local importance; or major examples of some particular period, style or building type, which may have been altered."
- Category C: "buildings of local importance; lesser examples of any period, style, or building type, as originally constructed or moderately altered; and simple traditional buildings which group well with other listed buildings."

In March 2016 there were 47,288 listed buildings in Scotland. Of these, 8% were Category A, and 50% were Category B, with the remaining 42% being Category C.

== See also ==
- List of listed buildings in Aberdeenshire
