= Patrick Dun (educator) =

Scottish scholar (1580–1652)

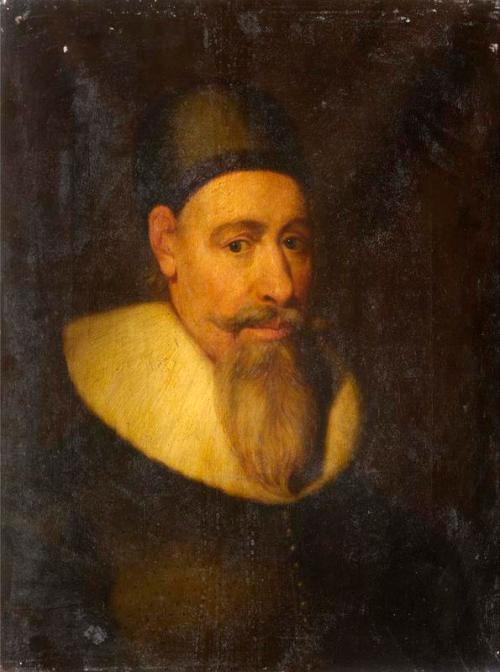
- Born: 1581; Aberdeen
- Died: 1652 (aged 70–71)
- Occupation: Principal of Marischal College

Academic background
- Education: Marischal College; University of Basel

Patrick Dun (1581–1652) was a Scottish scholar who was principal of Marischal College (now part of the University of Aberdeen) from 1621 to 1649.

== Life ==
He was born in Aberdeen the son of Andrew Dun, a city burgess. He was educated at Aberdeen Grammar School and at the newly created Marischal College under Robert Howie. He went to Switzerland and received a doctorate in medicine (MD) at the University of Basel in 1601 then obtained a post as professor at Helmstedt 1603/4. He wrote "Themata medica de dolore colico" in 1607, it was published at Basil.

He returned to Aberdeen in 1610 and took the position as Professor of Physic at King's College, Aberdeen, becoming Rector in 1619; he was also mediciner there. In 1621 he succeeded William Forbes as Principal of Marischal College. When the college was damaged by fire in 1639, Dun personally contributed to the cost of rebuilding.

In 1629 he purchased the estate of Ferryhill, just south of Aberdeen and was thereafter referred to "Patrick Dun of Ferryhill".

He resigned in 1649 his principalship and died in 1652. His position as principal was filled by William Moir. He bequeathed the Ferryhill estate to the City of Aberdeen.

== Publications ==
- Themata Medica de Dolore Colico (1607)
- Editing of Duncan Liddel's Ars Conservandi Sanitatem (1651)

== Artistic recognition ==
He was portrayed by George Jamesone around 1630 and the portrait originally hung at Aberdeen Grammar School but is now held by Aberdeen Art Gallery.

== Family ==
Dun was uncle of Patrick Dun who rose to fame in Ireland.
