= George Boyne =

British university administrator and academic

George Boyne FAcSS FRSE
- Professor Boyne in 2022

Principal and Vice Chancellor of the University of Aberdeen
- In office 1 August 2018 – 31 October 2025
- Chancellor: Queen Camilla
- Preceded by: Ian Diamond
- Succeeded by: Pete Edwards

Personal details
- Born: October 1955 (age 70) Aberdeen, Scotland, UK
- Education: University of Aberdeen (MA, MLitt); University of Bath (PhD)

Academic background
- Thesis: The Politics of Local Policy Variation (1989)

George Boyne FAcSS FRSE (born October 1955) is a British academic and public sector scholar who served as Principal and Vice-Chancellor of the University of Aberdeen between August 2018 and October 2025. He was previously Pro-Vice Chancellor of Cardiff University and Dean of Cardiff Business School.

== Early life and education ==
Boyne was born in October 1955 in Aberdeen. After attending King Street Primary School and Aberdeen Grammar School, he continued his studies in Aberdeen and became a double graduate of the University of Aberdeen where he took a politics and economics degree. In 1989, he completed a PhD at the University of Bath with a thesis titled "The politics of local policy variation".

== Career ==
Prior to joining the University of Aberdeen, Boyne was Pro Vice-Chancellor of the College of Arts, Humanities and Social Sciences and a professor of public sector management at Cardiff University. Boyne has published on the performance of public sector organisations, and has been a Fellow of the Academy of Social Sciences since 2010. He has authorial credit on eight books and over 140 articles in academic journals.

=== University of Aberdeen ===
In August 2018, Boyne joined Aberdeen as Principal and led the creation of the University’s Aberdeen 2040 strategy which was launched in February 2020 to mark the 525th anniversary of the University’s foundation. He is also Chair of the University Senate, a member of the University Court and a member of the Board of the University’s Development Trust. His external roles include Chair of the Universities and Colleges Employers Association (UCEA), member of the Board of UCEA UK, member of the Board of Opportunity North East, and member of the Aberdeen City Deal Joint Committee.

Boyne faced criticism in July 2023, when an investigation by student newspaper The Gaudie uncovered WhatsApp messages in which Boyne told colleagues he wanted staff participating in the marking and assessment boycott to feel 'pain along the way.' Boyne's comments were subject to controversy among members of the University and College Union on social media, and received national coverage. A poll conducted by The Gaudie several days later found that nearly 70% of students and staff believed Boyne should step down.

He also faced criticism in October 2023 when University of Aberdeen announced cuts to courses and jobs in the School of Language, Literature, Music and Visual Culture, prompting protests. The French, German, Spanish and Italian consulates in Scotland wrote to Boyne to change his mind.

In March 2025, Boyne announced that he would retire from his position as Principal and Vice-Chancellor in December. After his successor was found, he retired at the end of October and moved to Wales to spend more time with family.

Academic offices
Preceded by Sir Ian Diamond	Principal and Vice-Chancellor of the University of Aberdeen; April 2018—October 2025	Succeeded by Pete Edwards
