= James Leslie (principal) =

Scottish physician

- Born: c.1610 Aberdeen
- Died: 1678
- Occupation: Principal of Marischal College
- Spouses: Elizabeth Lumsden; Miss Gray; Margaret Bennet
- Children: 6

James Leslie (c.1610–1678) was a Scottish physician who was principal of Marischal College (now part of the University of Aberdeen) from 1661 until his death in 1678.

== Life ==
He was born in Aberdeen the son of Thomas Leslie a burgess. He studied medicine at Aberdeen University and qualified as a physician. In 1661 he replaced William Moir as principal of Marischal College.

He died in 1678. His position as principal was filled by Robert Paterson.

== Family ==
He married three times:

Firstly to Elizabeth Lumsden of Ruthrieston (d.1663) and had three children:

- John Leslie
- Marjory – married Robert Bruce
- Ann Leslie – married John Forbes, Laird of Corse

Secondly he married Miss Gray, daughter of Provost Gray of Aberdeen and had three more children:

- Elizabeth – married George Peacock
- Catherine
- Magdalen

Lastly he married Margaret Bennet.
