= Patrick Copland =

Scottish natural philosopher and university teacher

Patrick Copland FRSE FSA LLD (January 1749 – 10 November 1822) was a Professor of Mathematics (1775-1779) and Natural Philosophy (1779-1817) at Marischal College in Aberdeen. He was a co-founder of the Royal Society of Edinburgh in 1783. He was a keen astronomer and was responsible for building the Castlehill Observatory in Aberdeen. He was a pioneer of the use of demonstration equipment (much of his own design) to explain the principles of mathematics and physics.

== Life ==
He was born in January 1749 (many sources erroneously state 1748, calculating using his known age at death) at the manse of Fintray in Aberdeenshire, the son of Rev Samuel Copland, from a family originating in Tough.

In 1762, he won a bursary to Marischal College in Aberdeen. He was taught Mathematics under Prof John Stewart and Natural Philosophy under Prof George Skene. In 1774 Copland became assistant to Prof George Skene. In 1779 he replaced Prof William Traill as professor of Mathematics at Marischal. He is known to have been an associate of the Linnean Society.

In 1780, he began a public campaign to gather funds to build and equip the Castlehill Observatory in Aberdeen, and this was completed in October 1781, including a telescope by Peter Dollond at the recommendation of Nevil Maskelyne the Astronomer Royal. The observatory had considerable financial input from John Stuart, 3rd Earl of Bute, who was also Chancellor of Marischal College at that time. Curiously, in 1783, Copland was accused of involvement in the "Black Arts" through his numerous experiments with electricity at the Observatory, "drawing mischief out of the clouds with his electric batteries". In 1803, he purchased Fountainhall House in Aberdeen (now 130 Blenheim Place) from his former mentor, Prof George Skene, and this remained his home until death.

He resigned on 5 October 1822 and died around a month later, on 10 November 1822, aged 73.

== Students ==
- Edward Ellice (merchant)
- Robert Davidson (inventor)

== Family ==
He was married to Elizabeth Ogilvie or Ogilvy. They had at least one son: Alexander Copland (b. 1788); and one daughter, Mary Copland.
