= Foveran =

Coordinates: 57.305°N 2.046°W

- Location within Aberdeenshire
- OS grid reference: NJ980232
- Council area: Aberdeenshire
- Lieutenancy area: Aberdeenshire
- Country: Scotland
- Sovereign state: United Kingdom
- Post town: ELLON
- Postcode district: AB41
- Dialling code: 01358
- Police: Scotland
- Fire: Scottish
- Ambulance: Scottish
- UK Parliament: Gordon and Buchan
- Scottish Parliament: Aberdeenshire East

Foveran is the name of both a parish and village in Aberdeenshire, Scotland. The village is located 11 miles (18 km) north of Aberdeen and 4 miles (6.4 km) southeast of Ellon; the main group of houses and the village school are located adjacent to the main A90 trunk road.

The origin of the place-name is from the Scottish Gaelic word fuaran indicating a place with a little spring and appears as Furene in c. 1150.

The hereditary baronetcy of Foveran is held by the Turing family (see Turing Baronets). The cryptographer and computing pioneer Alan Turing (1912–1954) was uncle to the present Baronet.

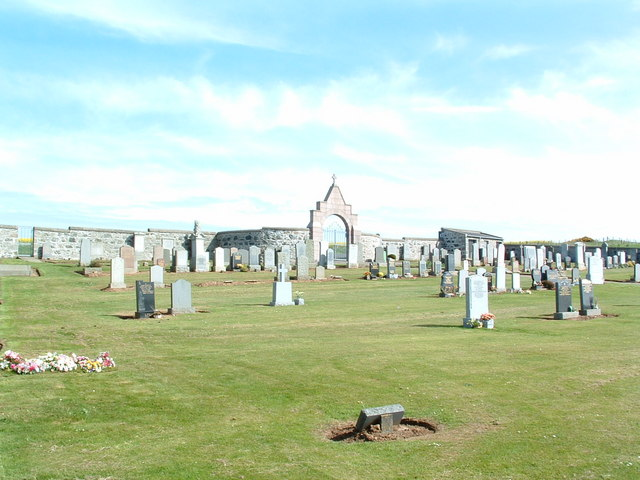
Foveran Cemetery, east of the village

== Notable people ==
- William Duff, minister and psychologist, born in Foveran.
- Rev John Paterson, minister of Foveran, later Bishop of Ross
- Robert Paterson (d.1717) principal of Marischal College, son of above
