= Kinaldie railway station =

Disused railway station in Scotland

Kinaldie
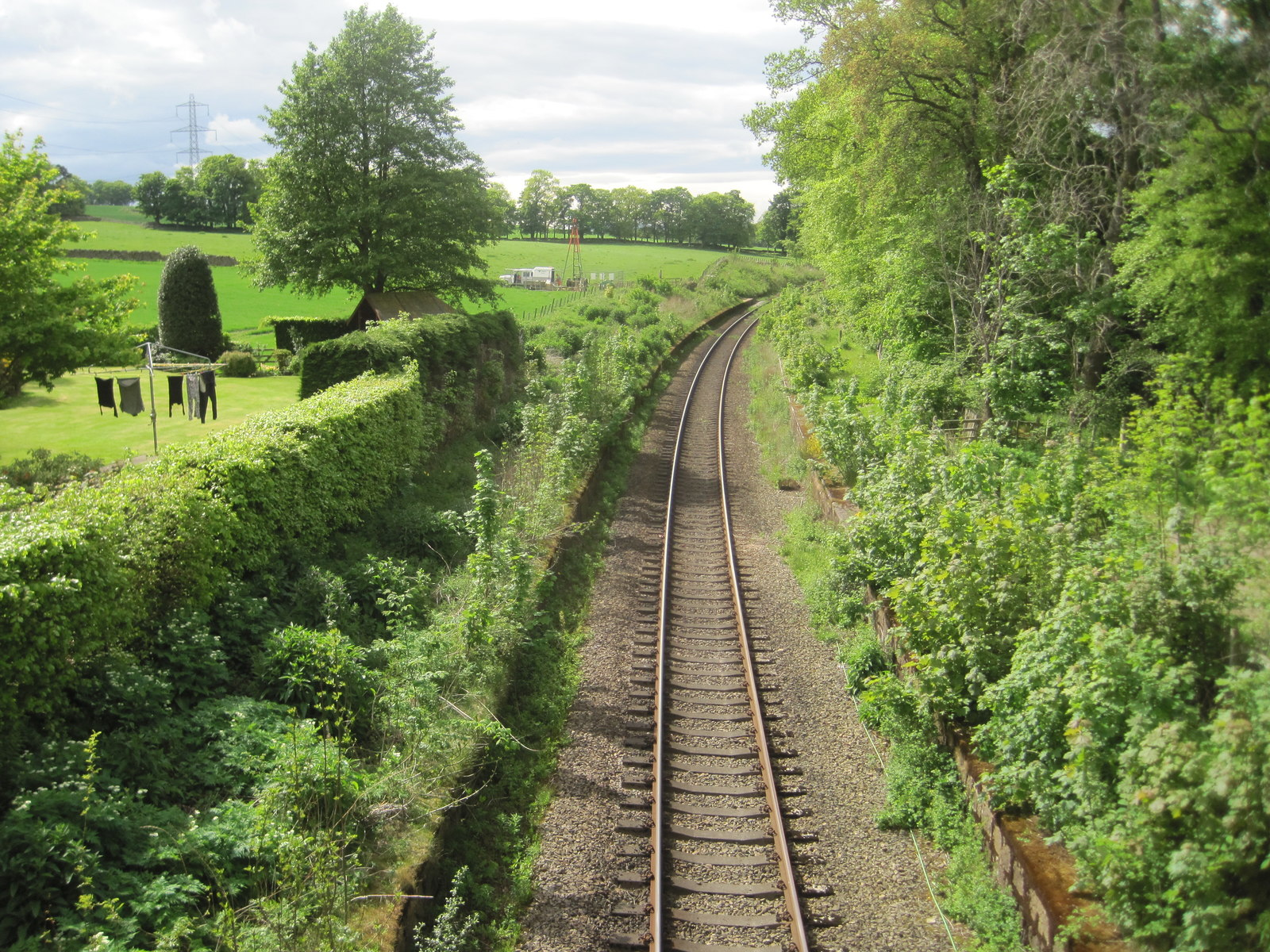
- The site of the station in 2017

General information
- Location: Kinaldie, Aberdeenshire; Scotland
- Coordinates: 57.228°N 2.283°W
- Platforms: 2

Other information
- Status: Disused

History
- Original company: Great North of Scotland Railway
- Pre-grouping: Great North of Scotland Railway
- Post-grouping: LNER

Key dates
- November 1854: Opened
- 7 December 1964: Closed
Location

Kinaldie railway station was a railway station in Kinaldie, Aberdeenshire.

== History ==
The station was opened in November 1854 on the Great North of Scotland Railway Main Line between Aberdeen and Inverurie. The station was closed as part of the Beeching cuts on 7 December 1964.

== Historic services ==
Preceding station	Historical railways	Following station
Pitmedden; Line open; station closed	Great North of Scotland Railway; GNoSR Main Line	Kintore; Line open; original station closed; new station opened 2020
