= Peter Edwards (computer scientist) =

British academic and computer scientist

Peter Edwards CITP FBCS FIET FRSA

Principal and Vice Chancellor of the University of Aberdeen
- Incumbent
- Assumed office 1 November 2025
- Chancellor: Queen Camilla
- Preceded by: George Boyne

Personal details
- Born: Peter Edwards; August 1963 (age 63) Wrexham, Wales, UK
- Education: University of Leeds (PhD)

Peter Edwards (born August 1963) is a British academic and computer scientist who has served as Principal and Vice-Chancellor of the University of Aberdeen since November 2025. He previously held a number of senior leadership positions at the university, most recently as Vice-Principal for Regional Engagement. His research interests focus on intelligent information infrastructures that promote transparency and accountability in computational systems.

== Early life and education ==
Edwards was born in Wrexham, Wales in August 1963. He studied chemistry for his undergraduate degree and was awarded a PhD in computational chemistry by the University of Leeds in 1988.

== Career ==
After the University of Leeds, Edwards joined the Department of Computing Science at the University of Aberdeen as a postdoctoral researcher in 1988. He has spent over 35 years at the University, being promoted to Senior Lecturer in 2002 and Professor in 2009. He has held a range of senior academic and leadership roles at the University of Aberdeen, including Head of Computing Science, Head of the College of Physical Sciences Graduate School, Director of the Northern Research Partnership Graduate School (a collaboration among the Universities of Aberdeen, Dundee, and Robert Gordon), Head of the School of Natural and Computing Sciences, Vice-Principal for Regional Engagement and Acting Senior Vice-Principal.

Edwards was announced as the internal appointment for Principal of University of Aberdeen on 13 October 2025 following a twice-failed external search.

== Publications (selected) ==
- “Using Knowledge Graphs to Unlock Practical Collection, Integration, and Audit of AI Accountability Information”. Naja, I., Markovic, M., Edwards, P., Pang, W., Cottrill, C. and Williams, R. IEEE Access, 2022, 10: 74383 - 74411.
- "A Semantic Framework to Support AI System Accountability and Audit”. Naja, I., Markovic, M., Edwards, P. and Cottrill, C. The Semantic Web - ESWC 2021, Lecture Notes in Computer Science, Springer, 2021, 12731: 160-176.
- "Governance and Accountability in Internet of Things (IoT) Networks”. Jacobs, N., Edwards, P., Cottrill, C. and Salt, K. The Oxford Handbook of Digital Technology and Society . Yates, S. J. and Rice, R. E. (Eds.), Oxford Academic, 2020, 628-655.
- "Semantic Modelling of Plans and Execution Traces for Enhancing Transparency of IoT Systems”. Markovic, M., Garijo, D., Edwards, P. and Vasconcelos, W. Proceedings of the 6th IEEE International Conference on Internet of Things: Systems, Management and Security , IEEE Explore, 2019, 110-115.
- "Linking Open Data and the Crowd for Real-time Passenger Information”. Corsar, D., Edwards, P., Nelson, J., Baillie, C., Papangelis, K. and Velaga, N. Journal of Web Semantics, 2017, 43:18–24.
- "An Access Control Model for Protecting Provenance Graphs”. Chen, L., Edwards, P., Nelson, J. D. and Norman, T. J. Proceedings of the 13th Annual Conference on Privacy, Security and Trust (PST), IEEE Press, 2015, 125-132.
- "The Transport Disruption Ontology”. Corsar, D., Markovic, M., Edwards, P. and Nelson, J. D. The Semantic Web - ISWC 2015, Proceedings of the 14th International Semantic Web Conference, Lecture Notes in Computer Science, Springer, 2015, 9367:329-336.
- "TRAAC: Trust and Risk Aware Access Control”. Burnett, C., Chen, L., Edwards, P. and Norman, T. J. F. Proceedings of the 12th Annual International Conference on Privacy, Security and Trust (PST), IEEE Press, 2014, 371-378.
- "ourSpaces – Design and Deployment of a Semantic Virtual Research Environment”. Edwards, P., Pignotti, E., Eckhardt, A., Ponnamperuma Arachchi, K. A., Mellish, C. S. and Bouttaz, T. The Semantic Web – ISWC 2012, Proceedings of the 11th International Semantic Web Conference, Lecture Notes in Computer Science, Springer, 2012, 7650 2: 50-65.
- "Enhancing Workflow with a Semantic Description of Scientific Intent”. Pignotti, E., Edwards, P., Gotts, N. and Polhill, G. Journal of Web Semantics, 2011, 9(2): 222-244.

Academic offices
Preceded by George Boyne	Principal and Vice-Chancellor of the University of Aberdeen; November 2025—present	Succeeded by Incumbent
