= Thomas Murray Taylor =

Scottish advocate and university administrator (1897-1962)

Sir Thomas Murray Taylor CBE FRSE KC

Principal of the University of Aberdeen
- In office 1948–1962
- Preceded by: Sir William Hamilton Fyfe
- Succeeded by: Sir Edward Maitland Wright

Personal details
- Born: 27 May 1897 Keith, Moray, Scotland
- Died: 19 July 1962 (aged 65) Aberdeen, Aberdeenshire, Scotland
- Spouse: Helen Margaret Jardine (m. 1939)
- Children: 2
- Education: Keith Grammar School
- Alma mater: University of Aberdeen (MA), (LL.B)
- Profession: Advocate and university administrator

Sir Thomas Murray Taylor CBE FRSE KC (1897–1962) was a 20th-century Scottish advocate and university administrator. He was a devout Christian and active member of the United Free Church of Scotland. When this amalgamated with the Church of Scotland in 1929 he adopted the latter faith, becoming a church elder in 1936. From 1945 he served on the Executive Committee of the World Council of Churches.

He served as the Principal of the University of Aberdeen between 1948 and 1962. The Taylor Building and Taylor Library at the University of Aberdeen School of Law is named in his honour.

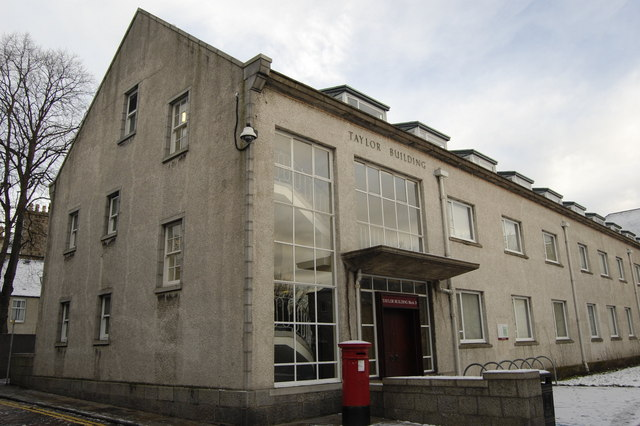
The Taylor Building

== Life ==
He was born in Keith, Banffshire on 27 May 1897 the only son of John Taylor, a cattle farmer and wholesale cattle dealer, and his wife, Jenny Nichol Murray. He was educated at Banff Grammar School then studied Classics at Aberdeen University. He was exempted from military service in the First World War due to a weak heart. He graduated MA in 1919 then (using a Ferguson Scholarship and intending a career in politics) took a second degree in Law, graduating LLB in 1922. He specialised in jurisprudence and constitutional law.

He was created an advocate in 1924 and practised in Edinburgh.

He joined the Labour Party in 1928 and stood as its candidate for Cathcart in 1930.

He left Edinburgh in 1935 to become Professor of Law at Aberdeen University. During this period (in 1944) he was created a Commander of the Order of the British Empire (CBE). He "took silk" as a King's Counsel in 1945. He then left academia to become Sheriff of Argyll then in 1948 became Sheriff of Renfrew. In 1948 he returned to academia as Principal and Vice Chancellor of Aberdeen University.

In 1953 he was elected a Fellow of the Royal Society of Edinburgh. His proposers were William Ogilvy Kermack, Ernest Cruickshank, James Robert Matthews and Thomas Phemister. He was knighted the following year.

Over and above his church work he also chaired the UK Commission of Prevention of War in an Atomic Age 1960/61.

He retired in 1962 and died in Aberdeen on 19 July 1962.

== Family ==
In 1939 he married Dr Helen Margaret Jardine, daughter of Rev David Little Jardine of Durisdeer.

They could not have children but adopted a son in 1944 and daughter in 1945.

== Publications ==
- The Discipline of Virtue (1954)
- Where One Man Stands (1960)

Academic offices
Preceded by Sir William Hamilton Fyfe	Principal and Vice-Chancellor of the University of Aberdeen; 1948—1962	Succeeded by Sir Edward Maitland Wright
