= Robert Davidson (inventor) =

British inventor, built first electric locomotive (1804–1894)

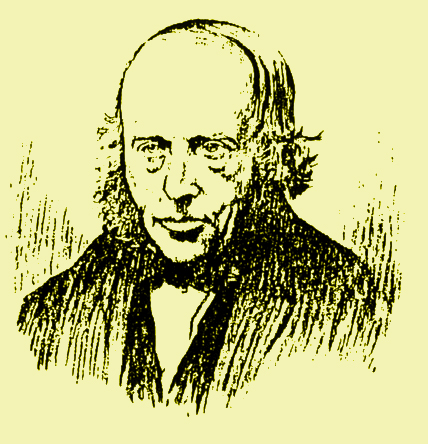
- Born: 18 April 1804
- Died: 16 November 1894 (aged 90)
- Education: Marischal College, University of Aberdeen
- Occupations: chemist and inventor
- Known for: Built the first electric railway locomotive

Robert Davidson (18 April 1804 – 16 November 1894) was a Scottish inventor who built the first known electric four-wheeled car in 1839 and the first known electric locomotive in 1842. He was a lifelong resident of Aberdeen, in northeast Scotland, where he was a prosperous chemist and dyer, amongst other ventures. Davidson was educated at Marischal College, where he studied second- and third-year classes from 1819 to 1821, including lectures from Professor Patrick Copland. He got this education in return for being a lab assistant.

In the 1820s, he set up in business close to the Aberdeen-Inverurie Canal, at first supplying yeast, before becoming involved in the manufacture and supply of chemicals. He later became interested in the new electrical technologies of the day. From 1837, he made small electric motors on his own principles.

== Exhibitions ==
Davidson staged an exhibition of electrical machinery in Aberdeen and Edinburgh, where it was viewed on 12 February 1842 by the young James Clerk Maxwell.

Later he exhibited at the Egyptian Hall in Piccadilly in London, where he hoped to attract sponsorship for his work. Among the machines shown were his locomotive, an electrically driven lathe and printing press, and an electromagnet capable of lifting two tons.

== First electric railway locomotive ==
Davidson made a model electric locomotive in 1837. His Galvani of 1842 was a four-wheeled machine powered by zinc-acid batteries. It was tested on the Edinburgh–Glasgow line in September 1842 and, although found capable of carrying itself at 4 mph (6.4 km/h), it did not haul any passengers or goods. Davidson had trained as a chemist and made a successful business in the production of synthetic yeast for the baking and brewing industries. This gave him time to devote to his hobby of electromagnetism. He designed his own chemical batteries to provide power and, being a practical man, was enthusiastic about the potential of electromagnetism to drive machinery. By 1839 he had designed a printing press, a turning lathe and a four-wheeled car that all used Davidson's batteries and rudimentary electric motor. Davidson decided to demonstrate his inventions to the public and arranged an exhibition of his work, first of all in Aberdeen and subsequently in Edinburgh. He converted his car to run on a circular wooden track for the exhibition and even printed the handbills advertising the show on his electrically powered printing press.

Davidson had such faith in the opportunities that electromagnetism offered that he had his eye on a bigger and more ambitious scheme. He approached the directors of the Edinburgh and Glasgow Railway for their support in building an electromagnetic railway locomotive. Davidson aimed to show the new railway company that electric locomotives were a practical option. He obtained the endorsement of the Royal Scottish Society for Arts in his ventures and they made him a £15 grant. He built a full-sized locomotive, Galvani of 1842, which was a four-wheeled machine, 16 feet (4.9 m) long and powered by Davidson's batteries. It was trialled on a section of the Edinburgh to Glasgow line in 1842 and thus became the world's first electrically powered railway locomotive. This was its only claim to fame, as the locomotive only managed to achieve a speed of 4 mph (6.4 km/h) and as the batteries were not rechargeable, it was hardly practical. The directors were not sufficiently impressed to ask Davidson to take the concept further. The locomotive was reported as being destroyed whilst stored in the engine house at Perth.

=== Legacy ===
Davidson has been described as a forgotten hero and electrical visionary. He could not interest the rail companies, as the technology he employed was too expensive.

In 1840, the Aberdeen Banner had predicted that the type of machinery he was producing "will in no distant date supplant steam"; however, it was only when electric locomotives were introduced in the 1890s that the media came to recognize the significance of Davidson's achievement. He was described as the "oldest living electrician" and The Electrician magazine reported "Robert Davidson was undoubtedly the first to demonstrate the possibility of electrical traction in a practical way".

A working model of his electrical motor can be seen at the Grampian Transport Museum.

== Business and later life ==
After 1843, at home in Aberdeen, he settled down to family life and, for the next fifty years, the running of his business at Canal Road. His earlier invention of a method for large-scale production of yeast, one of the staples of his chemical business, and the manufacture of perfumes were so remunerative that they allowed him to indulge his many interests of astronomy, collecting of fine china, valuable pictures and a large collection of violins.

== See also ==
- Neale (electric car)
