= John David Maitland Wright =

British mathematician (1942–2023)

John David Maitland Wright FRSE
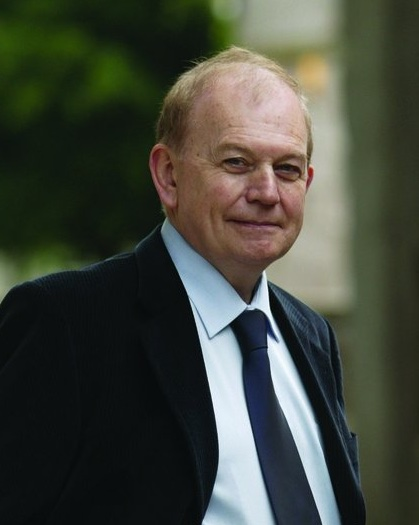
- Born: 20 May 1942; Aberdeen, Scotland
- Died: 7 August 2023 (aged 81); Reading, Berkshire, England
- Education: Christ Church, Oxford
- Children: 4
- Scientific career
- Fields: Operator algebra, functional analysis
- Workplaces: University of Aberdeen; University of Reading; Christ Church, Oxford
- Doctoral advisor: David Albert Edwards

John David Maitland Wright FRSE (20 May 1942 – 7 August 2023) was a British mathematician, specialising mainly in functional analysis and operator theory.

== Early life and education ==
Wright was born on 20 May 1942, the son of Phyllis (née Harris) and mathematician Sir Edward Maitland Wright. He went to Aberdeen Grammar School and subsequently studied mathematics at the University of Aberdeen.

Wright graduated with first class honours from University of Aberdeen in 1964. For his postgraduate studies he went to Christ Church, Oxford where he obtained his doctorate in 1967. For his thesis on measure theory, Wright was awarded the Oxford Senior Mathematical Prize and Johnson Prize.

== Career ==
In 1965 Wright was appointed to a junior college lectureship at Christ Church and in 1968 became the Leathersellers’ Tutorial Fellow in Mathematics at St Catherine’s College, Oxford.

In 1971, at the age of 28, he was appointed professor of pure mathematics at the University of Reading and later became head of department.

Wright was treasurer of the London Mathematical Society from 1986 to 1994 and deputy director of the Isaac Newton Institute in Cambridge from 1994 to 1996.

In 2004 he was appointed to a Sixth Century Chair at the University of Aberdeen which he held until his retirement in 2015. Subsequently he became senior associate research fellow of Christ Church, Oxford until 2021.

Wright worked mainly in functional analysis, measure theory, operator theory and related areas, including applications to quantum theory. He published over 130 papers in mathematical journals. A significant part of Wright's research work was on AW*-Algebras and monotone complete C*-algebras culminating in a book coauthored with Kazuyuki Saito. Other notable work include results on Jordan C*-Algebras in 1977 and a solution of the Mackey-Gleason Problem in 1994 (with L.J. Bunce).

== Honours ==
Wright was elected a Fellow of the Royal Society of Edinburgh in 1978 and Foreign (Honorary) Academician of the Società Nazionale di Scienze, Lettere e Arti in Napoli in 1994.

== Selected bibliography ==
- Wright, J. D. M. (1977), "Jordan C∗-algebras", Michigan Math. J., 24: 291–302, doi:10.1307/mmj/1029001946, Zbl 0384.46040
- Bunce, L.J.; Wright, J. D. M. (1992), "The Mackey-Gleason problem", Bull. Am. Math. Soc., New Series, 26 (2): 288–293, arXiv:math/9204228, doi:10.1090/S0273-0979-1992-00274-4, Zbl 0759.46054
- Saito, K.; Wright, J.D.M. (2015). Monotone complete C*-algebras and generic dynamics. London: Springer. Zbl 1382.46003.
