= Paul Curran (geographer) =

British geographer (born 1955)

Sir Paul Curran
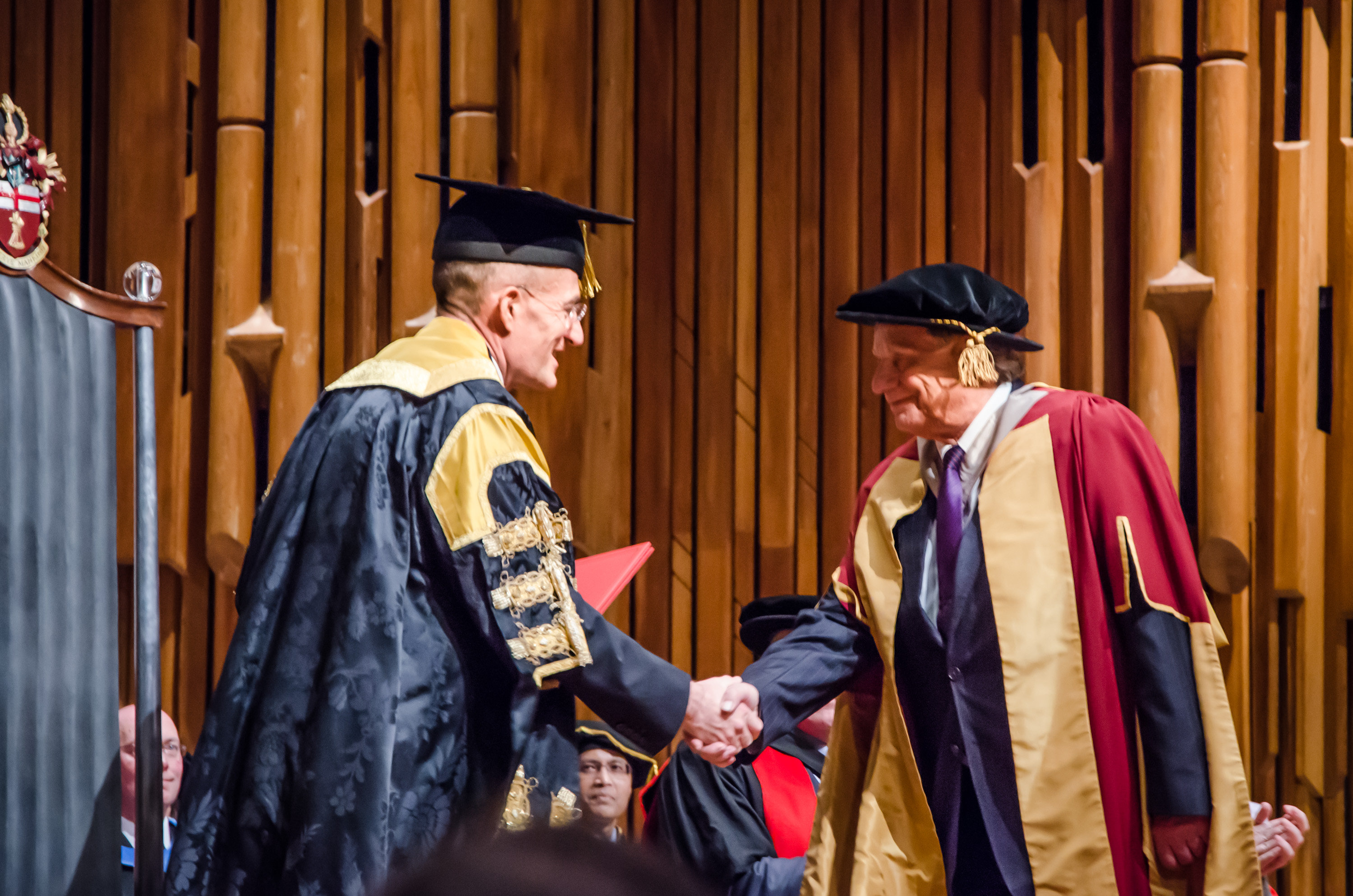
- Professor Sir Paul Curran (left) awarding Zhores Alferov an honorary degree
- Born: May 17, 1955 (age 71)
- Education: University of Sheffield (BSc, 1976); University of Bristol (PhD, 1979; DSc, 1991); University of Southampton (MBA, 1998)
- Known for: Satellite remote sensing of environmental and climate change Carbon cycle modeling in forests Higher education leadership
- Awards: Remote Sensing Society Gold Medal; Royal Geographical Society Patron's Medal (2007); Knight Bachelor (2016)

Sir Paul James Curran FRGS (born 17 May 1955) was president of City, University of London between August 2010 and June 2021. Sir Paul is now professor emeritus. Following a period of significant progress, City joined the University of London Federation in September 2016. He served previously as vice-chancellor of Bournemouth University (2005–10) and deputy vice-chancellor at the University of Southampton, where he is currently a visiting professor. As a member of the senior management team at Southampton, progressing from head of geography to dean of science, Curran was credited with high-profile leadership as head of the Winchester School of Art, part of the University of Southampton.

== Biography ==
A former NASA research scientist and advisor to the European Space Agency, Curran's research interests include investigations into global environmental change, in particular the movement of carbon between the atmosphere and forests. His award-winning work in Earth observation, involving the use of satellite sensors to monitor the environment at local to global scales, is widely published and he is the youngest recipient of the Remote Sensing Society's gold medal.

He is chair of the MS Society, NHS National Joint Registry and Walbrook Institute London; non-executive director and trustee of the Universities Superannuation Scheme Ltd.; member of Academic Board, Metropolitan College Athens; president of the Remote Sensing and Photogrammetry Society and patron of The Conversation UK. He was chair of the national Review Body on Doctors' and Dentists' Remuneration (DDRB), where his 2015 report on hospital doctors' contracts sparked controversy in a stated attempt to the move to seven-day-a-week healthcare services; founding chair of the board of trustees for The Conversation UK; Chair of the Universities and Colleges Employers Association (UCEA) Board and led the employers' negotiating team in the national pay negotiations; a Member of the Natural Environment Research Council (NERC) and its remuneration committee and the chair of its Audit & Risk Assurance Committee; the chair of the Higher Education Funding Council for England (HEFCE), Higher Education Workforce Steering Group; a Member of the Quality Assurance Agency (QAA) Board and its Remuneration and Audit Committees; a member of the board of trustees for London Higher; and a member of Universities UK and its Research Policy and Innovation & Growth Policy Committees.

Curran received a BSc from the University of Sheffield in 1976, an MBA from the University of Southampton in 1998 and PhD and DSc degrees from the University of Bristol in 1979 and 1991 respectively. He is a Chartered Geographer and a Fellow of the Royal Geographical Society, Remote Sensing and Photogrammetry Society and Chartered Management Institute. His PhD was followed by academic appointments at the universities of Reading and Sheffield before moving to NASA Ames Research Center in 1988. He held established chairs in physical geography at the University of Wales, Swansea, from 1990 and the University of Southampton from 1993.

== Personal life ==
Curran is married, with one daughter. His leisure interests include boating and middle-distance running.

== Honours ==
In 2007, Queen Elizabeth II approved the award of the Patron's Medal of the Royal Geographical Society for his 'international development of geographical science through remote sensing and Earth observation'.

Curran holds honorary doctorates from Grand École ESCP, Paris (2017), and Peter the Great University St Petersburg, Russia (2019), and is a Freeman of the City of London (2017).

Curran was knighted in the 2016 New Year Honours for services to higher education.

== Select works ==
- Phenology of Vegetation (2011)
- Evaluation of Envisat (2011)
- Validating the MERIS (2010)
- Indian Ocean Tsunami (2007)
- Landcover Classification (2007)
- Evaluation of the MERIS (2007)
- Relating SAR Image Texture (2005)
- The MERIS Terrestrial Chlorophyll Index (2004)
- A Comparison of Texture Measures (2004)
- The Slope of the Playing Field (1994)

Preceded by Gillian Slater	Vice-Chancellor of Bournemouth University; 2005–2010	Succeeded by John Vinney
Preceded by Julius Weinberg	President of City, University London; 2010–2021	Succeeded by Anthony Finkelstein
