= An Introduction to the Theory of Numbers =

Math book by G. H. Hardy and E. M. Wright

- First edition
- Author: G. H. Hardy; E. M. Wright
- Language: English
- Subject: Number theory
- Genre: Textbook
- Published: 1938
- Publisher: Clarendon Press
- OCLC: 879664

An Introduction to the Theory of Numbers is a classic textbook in the field of number theory, by G. H. Hardy and E. M. Wright. It is on the list of 173 books essential for undergraduate math libraries.

The book grew out of a series of lectures by Hardy and Wright and was first published in 1938.

The third edition added an elementary proof of the prime number theorem, and the sixth edition added a chapter on elliptic curves.

== Reviews ==
- E. T. Bell (July 1939). "Review: G. H. Hardy and E. M. Wright, An Introduction to the Theory of Numbers", Bull. Amer. Math. Soc. 45(7): pp. 507–509
- Anderson, Ian (2010). "Reviews - An introduction to the theory of numbers (sixth edition), by G. H. Hardy and E. M. Wright. Pp. 620. 2008. £30 (paperback). ISBN: 978-0-19-921986-5 (Oxford University Press)". The Mathematical Gazette. 94 (529): 184. doi:10.1017/S0025557200007464. ISSN 0025-5572.
- Robertson, Edmund; O'Connor, John (July 2020). "Reviews of G H Hardy and E M Wright's Theory of Numbers". MacTutor History of Mathematics Archive.

== See also ==
- List of important publications in mathematics
