= William Duff (writer) =

Scottish Presbyterian minister (1732-1815)

- Born: 1732
- Died: 1815 (aged 82–83)
- Occupation: Scottish Presbyterian Minister
- Known for: Theory of genius

William Duff (1732–1815) was a Scottish Presbyterian minister and one of the first writers to analyse the nature of genius as a property of human psychology. His Essay on Original Genius is frequently cited as a landmark in the Western analysis of genius and creativity.

== Ministry and family ==
Duff was a Scottish minister and M.A., was licensed by the presbytery 25 June 1755, called 18 September, and ordained 8 October, when he was appointed to the parish of Glenbucket, Aberdeenshire. Thence he was transferred to Peterculter in the same county, 24 October 1766, being admitted 4 March 1767. He was nominated minister of Foveran, also in Aberdeenshire, in February 1774, and took up his home a year later. There he got a new church built in 1794, and died father of the synod, 23 February 1815, in the eighty-third year of his age, and sixtieth of his ministry.

== Theory of genius ==
Duff was primarily interested in establishing the cognitive traits that explained variance in people's accomplishments. He postulated three aspects: imagination, judgement and taste. He emphasised imagination as making the most important contribution to genius.

== Published works ==
Duff is author of:

1. An Essay on Original Genius and its Various Modes of Exertion in Philosophy and the Fine Arts, particularly in Poetry (anon.), octavo, London, 1767, a work which exhibits considerable acquaintance with classical authors. A sequel is
2. Critical Observations on the Writings of the most celebrated Original Geniuses in Poetry, octavo, London, 1770.
3. The History of Rhedi, the Hermit of Mount Ararat. An Oriental Tale (anon.), duodecimo, London, 1773.
4. Sermons on Several Occasions', 2 volumes duodecimo, Aberdeen, 1786.
5. Letters on the Intellectual and Moral Character of Women, octavo, Aberdeen, 1807.
6. The Last Address of a Clergyman in the Decline of Life, octavo, Aberdeen, 1814.

Duff also furnished an account of Foveran to Sir J. Sinclair's Statistical Account of Scotland.

== Family ==
On 4 September 1778, he married Ann Mitchell, by whom he had two sons and four daughters.
