= Universities and Colleges Employers Association =

University and Colleges Employers Association
- Abbreviation: UCEA
- Formation: 30 March 1994
- Legal status: Company limited by guarantee 02914327
- Purpose: Representative and advisor to higher education sector employers
- Location: Woburn House, 20 Tavistock Square, London WC1H 9HU
- Region served: UK
- Chief Executive: Raj Jethwa
- Chair: George Boyne
- Main organ: UCEA Newsletter
- Website: http://www.ucea.ac.uk

The Universities and Colleges Employers' Association (UCEA) is the employers' association for universities and colleges of higher education (HE) in the United Kingdom. It represents universities and HE colleges in national negotiations with the five sector trade unions, government bodies, funding councils and other stakeholders.

UCEA also provides advice to members (higher education institutions) on strategic and operational employment issues and undertakes research into human resource planning, pay, pensions, recruitment and retention of staff, and other employment related issues of interest.

UCEA was established as new employers’ body on 1 April 1994 with subscriptions invited from 1 August of that year. UCEA's membership includes all UK universities and higher education colleges.

The following are the constituent member organisations and the number of seats they have on the board: Universities UK (8), Universities Scotland (2), Committee of University Chairs (6) and GuildHE (2).

The chief executive is Raj Jethwa, and the Chair of the Board is Professor George Boyne, Principal and Vice-Chancellor of University of Aberdeen.

== List of Chairs ==
- Professor Sir Brian Fender, Vice-Chancellor, Keele University, Chair from 1994 to 1995
- Professor Philip Love, Vice-Chancellor, University of Liverpool, Chair from 1995 to 2002
- Dr Geoffrey Copland, Vice-Chancellor, University of Westminster, Chair from 2002 to 2006
- Professor Alasdair Smith, Vice-Chancellor, University of Sussex, Chair from 2006 to 2007
- Professor Sir William Wakeham, Vice-Chancellor, University of Southampton, Chair from 2007 to 2009
- Professor Sir Keith Burnett, Vice-Chancellor, University of Sheffield, Chair from 2009 to 2011
- Professor Sir Paul Curran, President, City University of London, Chair from 2011 to 2015
- Professor Mark E. Smith, Vice-Chancellor, Universities of Lancaster and Southampton, Chair from 2015 to 2022
- Professor George Boyne, Principal and Vice-Chancellor, University of Aberdeen, Chair from 2022 to present

== List of Chief Executives ==
- Stephen Rouse, from 1994 to 1997
- Peter Humphries, from 1997 to 2001
- Jocelyn Prudence, from 2001 to 2012
- Helen Fairfoul, from 2012 to 2020
- Raj Jethwa, from 2020 to present
