= William Hamilton Fyfe =

English-Canadian scholar and educational administrator (1878-1965)

Sir William Hamilton Fyfe
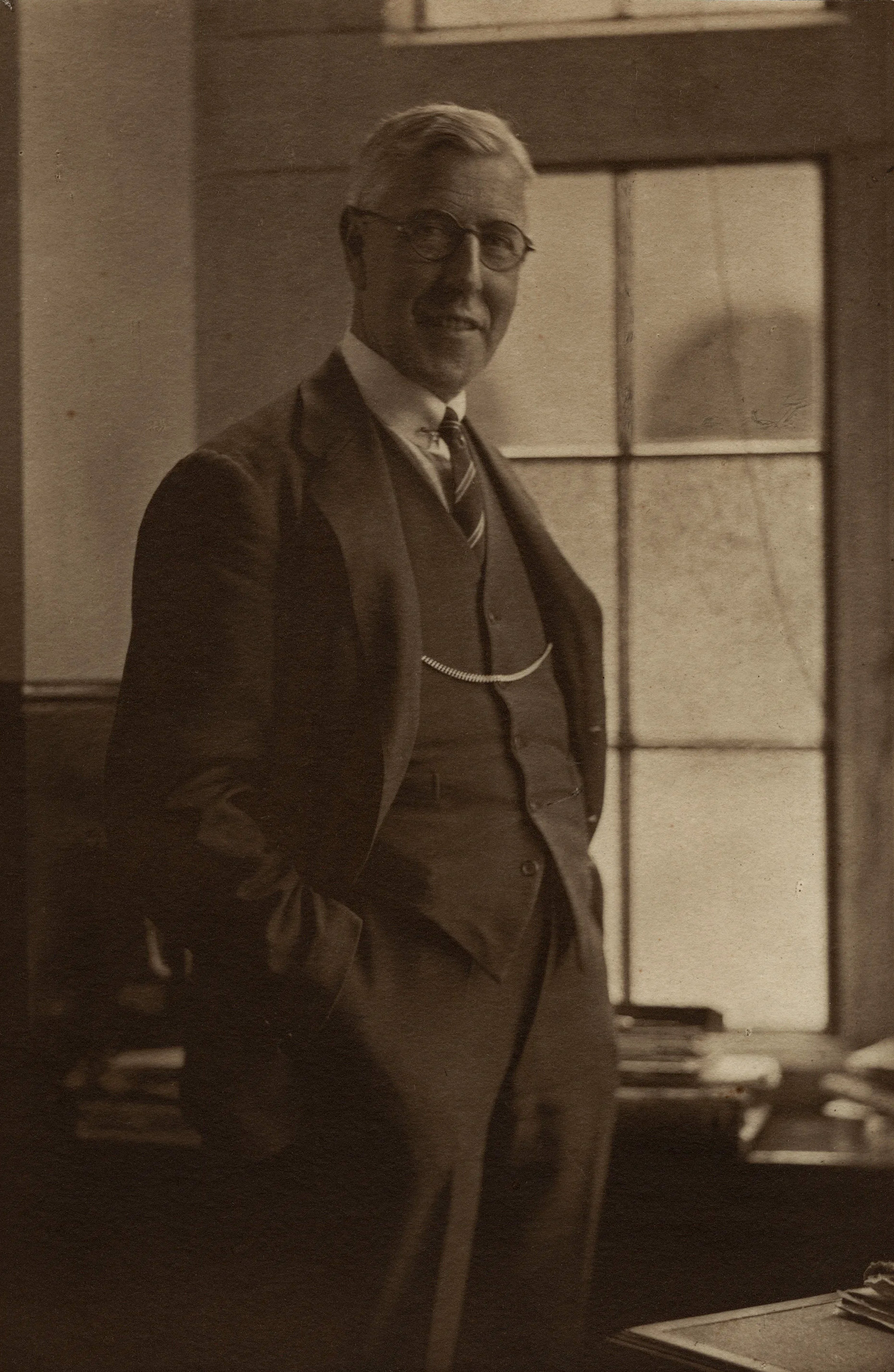
- Photograph by Olive Edis, c. 1931

Principal of the University of Aberdeen
- In office 1936–1948
- Preceded by: Sir George Adam Smith
- Succeeded by: Sir Thomas Murray Taylor

Principal of Queen's University at Kingston
- In office 1930–1936
- Preceded by: Robert Bruce Taylor
- Succeeded by: Robert Charles Wallace

Personal details
- Born: 9 July 1878 Kensington, London, England
- Died: 13 June 1965 (aged 86) London, England
- Spouse: Dorothea Hope Geddes White (m. 1908)
- Children: 3
- Education: Fettes College; Merton College, Oxford
- Profession: Scholar, educator, and university administrator

Sir William Hamilton Fyfe (9 July 1878 – 13 June 1965) was an English and Canadian classics scholar, educator, and educational administrator. He served as the 10th Principal of Queen's University, Ontario, from 1930 to 1936, and was the first layman to hold that position. He served as Principal and Vice-Chancellor of the University of Aberdeen from 1936 to 1948. He was knighted in 1942.

== Life ==
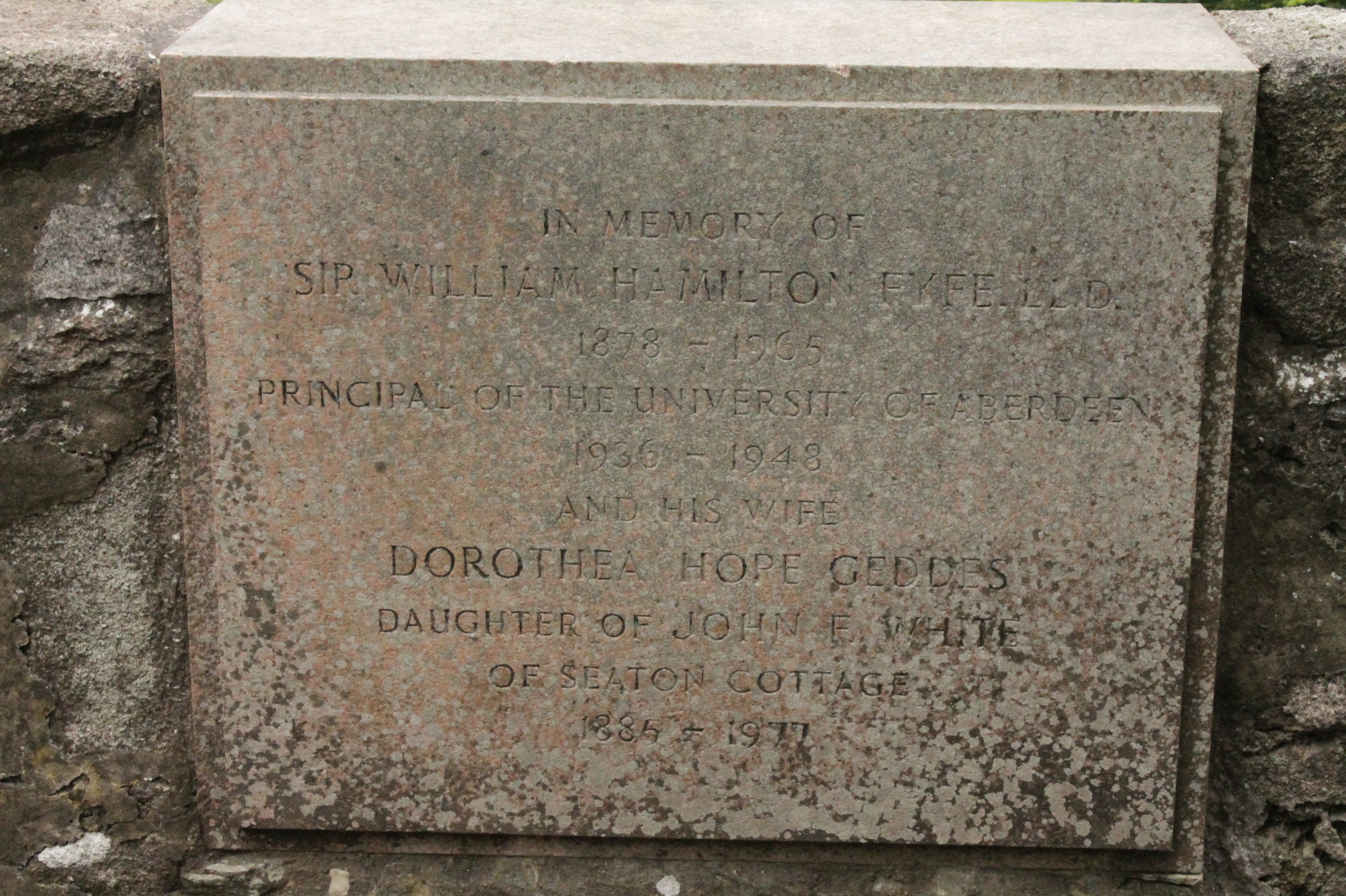
Memorial to William Hamilton Fyfe, St Machar's Cathedral churchyard

William Hamilton Fyfe was born in Kensington, London in 1878. He attended Fettes College in Edinburgh, Scotland. He then went on to Merton College, Oxford, where he graduated with a double first in Classics. He taught at Radley College from 1901 to 1903. He then returned to Merton to teach for 15 years.

He married Dorothea Hope Geddes White in 1908; the couple had three children, Maurice, Margaret, and Christopher.

During World War I, he served as a major with the British Intelligence Department of the War Office. In 1919 he was appointed headmaster of Christ's Hospital in Sussex, where he modernized the curriculum and authored several classical texts.

In 1930, he was appointed Principal of Queen's University in Kingston, Ontario, Canada. Fyfe had earlier expressed some disdain for the standard of education at 'colonial' universities, and so was recruited to improve the standards at Queen's. He had limited success in that task, since Canada was mired in the Great Depression, and funds were very scarce. But he did succeed in modernizing the curriculum somewhat, in raising the level of admission and scholarship, and in attracting increased prestige to Queen's.

He returned to Great Britain in 1936 to accept the position of Principal and Vice Chancellor at the University of Aberdeen in Scotland, where he served until 1948, when he retired. He was knighted by King George VI in 1942 for his many diverse achievements.

Fyfe died in London in 1965. He is memorialised in the churchyard of St Machar's Cathedral in Old Aberdeen.

== Family ==
He was married to Dorothea Hope Geddes White (1885–1977).

Academic offices
Preceded by Sir George Adam Smith	Principal and Vice-Chancellor of the University of Aberdeen; 1936—1948	Succeeded by Sir Thomas Murray Taylor
Preceded by Robert Bruce Taylor	Principal of Queen's University; 1930–1936	Succeeded by Robert Charles Wallace
