= E. M. Wright =

British mathematician (1906–2005)

Sir Edward Maitland Wright FRSE

Principal of the University of Aberdeen
- In office 1962–1976
- Preceded by: Sir Thomas Murray Taylor
- Succeeded by: Sir Fraser Noble

Personal details
- Born: 13 February 1906 Farnley, Yorkshire, England
- Died: 2 February 2005 (aged 98) Reading, Berkshire, England
- Spouse: Phyllis Harris
- Children: John David Maitland Wright
- Education: University of London; Jesus College, Oxford; Christ Church, Oxford
- Profession: Mathematician and university administrator

Sir Edward Maitland Wright FRSE (13 February 1906 – 2 February 2005) was an English mathematician, best known for co-authoring An Introduction to the Theory of Numbers Hardy & Wright (1938) with G. H. Hardy. He served as the Principal of the University of Aberdeen from 1962 to 1976.

== Career ==
He was born in Farnley, near Leeds, Yorkshire, where his father was a soap manufacturer. He moved to the south of England with his mother when his parents separated.

After obtaining a first-class mathematics degree as a self-taught external student at the University of London, Wright studied at Jesus College, Oxford and Christ Church, Oxford. His research career lasted from 1931 until the early 1980s, firstly on a Research Fellowship at Christ Church, which included a year in Göttingen, Germany. He was then appointed a lecturer at Christ Church, teaching there until 1935 followed by his appointment as Professor of Mathematics at the University of Aberdeen. He held that chair from 1936 to 1962, except for a break during the war (from 1943 to 1945) when he was seconded to the Air Ministry Intelligence at MI6 headquarters. He became Vice-Principal of the University in 1961 and Principal and Vice-Chancellor from 1962 until he stood down in 1976. He nevertheless continued to work as a Research Fellow at the University until 1983. A building there is named after him in recognition of his service to the university.

Wright worked in many different subspecialties, including number theory and graph theory, and published over a hundred papers. Most of his work focused on analytic number theory.

== Honours and awards ==
He was elected a Fellow of the Royal Society of Edinburgh in 1937 and awarded their Makdougall Brisbane Prize in 1952.

He was elected to the London Mathematical Society in 1929 and awarded their Senior Berwick Prize in 1978.

He was knighted in 1977 and awarded the Gold Medal of the Order of Polonia Restituta of Poland in 1978.

== Private life ==
He died in Reading shortly before his 99th birthday. He had married Phyllis Harris of North Wales, with whom he had a son, the mathematician John D. M. Wright.

== See also ==
- Fox–Wright function
- Wright generalized Bessel function
- Wright's formula

== Publications ==
- Hardy, G. H.; Wright, E. M. (1938). An Introduction to the Theory of Numbers. Oxford: Clarendon Press. JFM 64.0093.03.

Academic offices
Preceded by Sir Thomas Murray Taylor	Principal and Vice-Chancellor of the University of Aberdeen; 1962—1976	Succeeded by Sir Fraser Noble
