= Robert Howie (principal) =

Robert Howie (1568–c.1646) was a senior Church of Scotland minister who served both as Principal of St Mary's College, St Andrews and of Marischal College, Aberdeen.

== Life ==
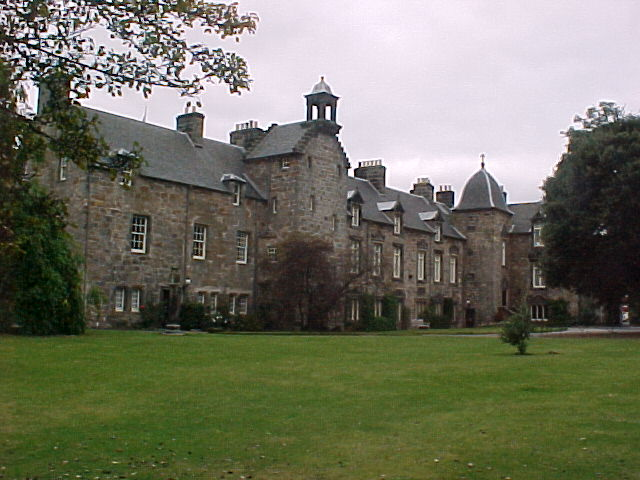
St Mary's College, St Andrews, of which Howie was Principal

Howie was born in or near Aberdeen in 1568 the eldest son of Robert Howie, a city merchant and burgess. He was educated at King's College, Aberdeen then travelled to Europe where he did further studies at both Herborn in Germany and Basel in Switzerland. In both he wrote several books, all in Latin.

On return to Scotland, he was appointed one of the ministers of the Kirk of St Nicholas in Aberdeen in 1591. In 1593 he was appointed as the first principal of the newly founded Marischal College (now part of the University of Aberdeen), and was a witness to its foundation charter. In 1598, he translated to be minister of Dundee, his place as principal filled by Gilbert Gray.

Howie had been moved to Dundee by the General Assembly to replace William Chrystesone. After seven years in Dundee, he incurred the wrath of the Provost and Town Council in July 1605 and was both deprived of office and banned from residing in Dundee. This related to his public objection to the election of the Provost being influenced by the King. He then found a position in Keith, Moray, but stayed there briefly as in July 1607 he succeeded Andrew Melville as principal of St Mary's College at St Andrews University. The university awarded him a Doctor of Divinity in 1616.

Howie served as principal for 40 years and died some time before 1647 when Samuel Rutherford succeeded him as principal.

== Family ==
He married and had a daughter Margaret Howie who married Andrew Lamont of Markinch.

== Publications ==
- Sphaera Georgii Buchanani Scoti (Herborn, 1586) a biography of George Buchanan
- Theses Philosophicae (Basel, 1587)
- Problema (Basel, 1588)
- Disputatio de Arbitrii Liberate (Basel, 1589)
- Theses (Basel, 1589)
- Didascatia (Basel, 1589)
- Theorema: Christus est Omnia in Omnibus (Basel, 1589)
