= Pitmedden railway station =

Former railway station in Scotland

Pitmedden
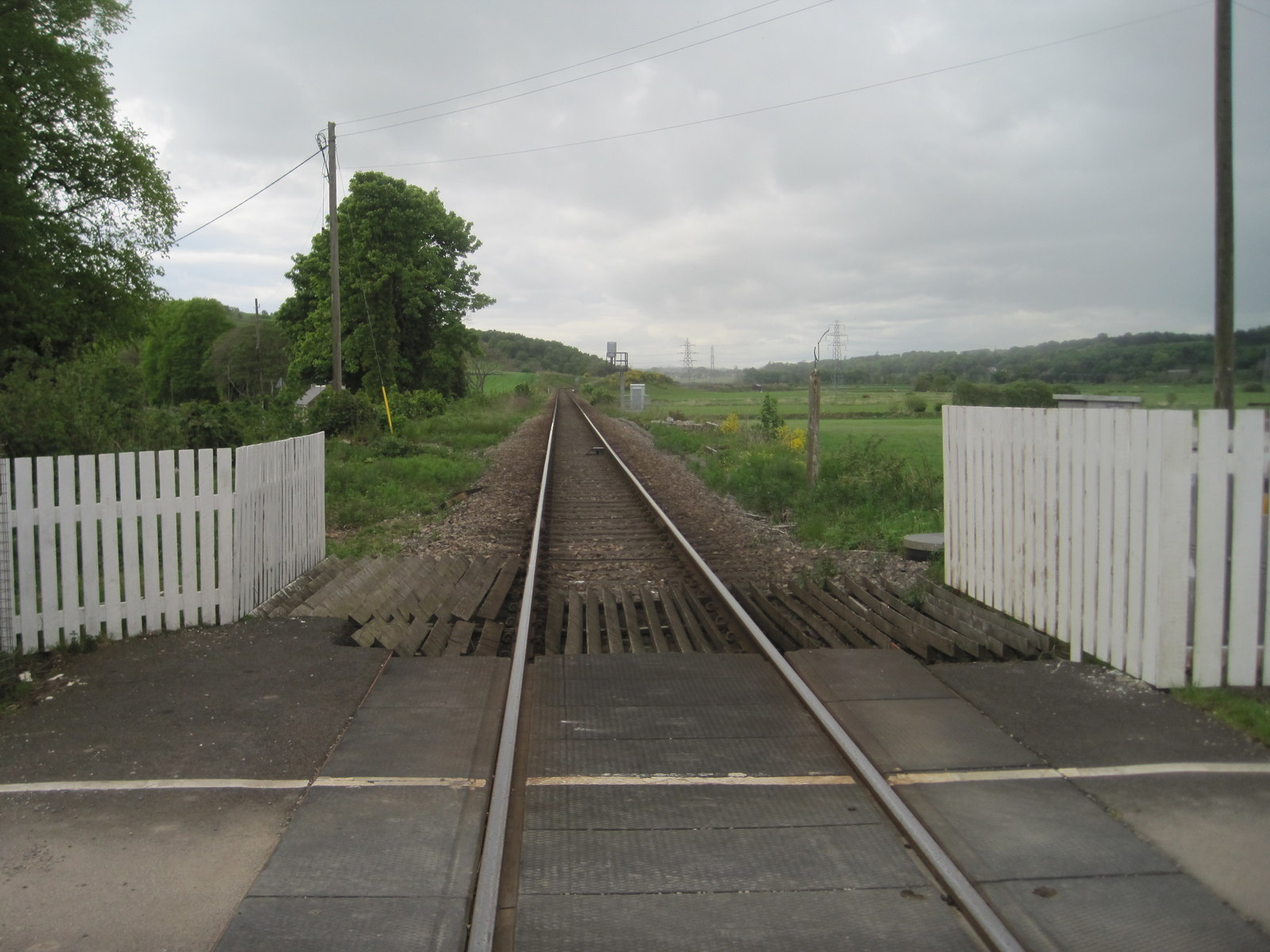
- The site of the station in 2017

General information
- Location: Dyce, Aberdeen; Scotland
- Coordinates: 57.226°N 2.228°W
- Platforms: 2

Other information
- Status: Disused

History
- Original company: Great North of Scotland Railway
- Pre-grouping: Great North of Scotland Railway

Key dates
- 1874: Opened
- 7 December 1964: Closed
Location

Pitmedden railway station was a railway station near Pitmedden House in Dyce, Aberdeen.

== Previous services ==
Preceding station	Historical railways	Following station
Dyce; Line and Station open	Great North of Scotland Railway; GNoSR Main Line	Kinaldie; Line open; Station closed
