= Robert Paterson (principal) =

Scottish academic (c.1635–1717)

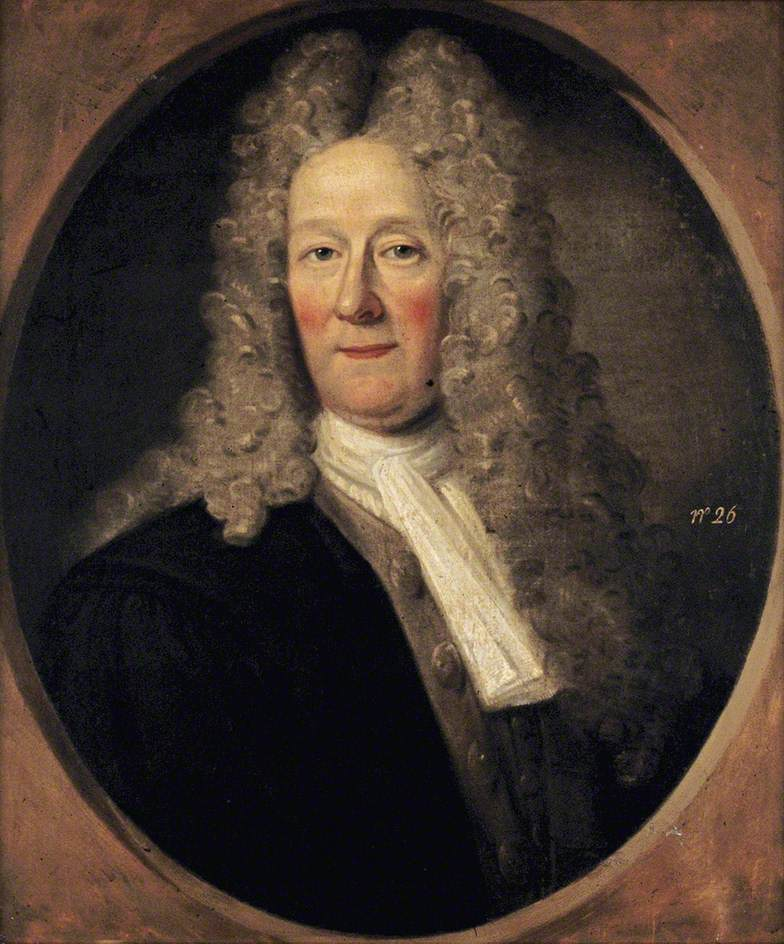
- Portrait of Robert Paterson by Charles Whyt
- Born: c. 1635; Foveran
- Died: 1717 (aged 81–82)
- Occupation: Principal of Marischal College
- Spouse: Agnes Carnegie
- Children: 8

Academic background
- Education: Marischal College

Robert Paterson (c. 1635 – 1717) was a Scottish academic who served as Principal of Marischal College from 1679 to 1717.

== Life ==
Paterson was born c. 1635, in Foveran, to John Paterson (later Bishop of Ross) and Elizabeth Ramsay. His siblings included John Paterson later (Archbishop of Glasgow); George Paterson of Seafield (commissary); Sir William Paterson of Granton (barrister and clerk to the privy council); and a daughter, Isabella, who married Kenneth Mackenzie of Suddie.

He was educated at Marischal College becoming a "regent" in 1657. In 1671, he started teaching the "Bajan class" at the college and in 1673 was appointed college librarian. In November 1678, he replaced James Leslie as principal of Marischal College. He embarked on an ambitious refurbishment of the college buildings, and was a patron to the local arts.

He was dismissed as principal due to his Jacobite sympathies in 1717 and died shortly thereafter.

== Arms ==
His coat of arms were described as: "Argent, three pelicans in their piety proper; on a chief azure as many mullets of the field; a mitre azure for difference".

== Family ==
He married Agnes Carnegie daughter of David Carnegie of Craige, minister of Farnell. They had two sons and six daughters:

- David
- Robert
- Elizabeth
- Margrat
- Agnes
- Mary
- Issobell
- Cathren
