= Gilbert Gray (educator) =

Gilbert Gray MA
- Born: 1576; Aberdeen
- Died: December 1614 (aged 37–38)
- Occupation: Principal of Marischal College
- Spouse: Marjorie Menzies
- Children: 2

Academic background
- Education: University of Edinburgh

Gilbert Gray (1576–1614), was the second principal of Marischal College, Aberdeen.

== Life ==
He was born in Aberdeen in 1576 the son of Gilbert Gray, baillie in Aberdeen. His maternal uncle was Alexander Rutherford, Provost of Aberdeen. He was educated at the University of Edinburgh, graduating with an MA in 1592. He then undertook further studies at King's College, Aberdeen and Heidelberg University.

Gray was appointed to the post of Principal in 1598 aged only 22, in place of Robert Howie (who moved to Dundee then became Principal of the University of St Andrews). He was a pupil of Robert Rollock, the first principal of the University of Edinburgh, whose virtues and learning he extolled in a curious Latin oration which he delivered in 1611, entitled ‘Oratio de Illustribus Scotiæ Scriptoribus.’ Several of the authors eulogised in it are fictitious. Gray accepted literally "the fabulous stories of Fergus the First having written on the subject of law 300 years B.C.; Dornadilla a century after composing rules for sportsmen; Reutha, the 7th king of Scotland, being a great promoter of schools and education; and King Josina, a century and a half before the Christian era, writing on botany and the practice of medicine." In 1614 he wrote a eulogy for Duncan Liddel, entitled 'Oratio funebris in memoriam Duncani Liddelli'. He was described as "remarkably diligent", and frequently gave public lectures. Gray died in December 1614 being buried on the 29th.

== Family ==
He married Marjorie Menzies and together they had seven children (two of whom died young), including two sons, Thomas and William, both of whom were later city burgesses.

== Publications ==
- Oratio de Illustribus Scotiæ Scriptoribus, 1611 (printed 1623)
- Funeral service of Duncan Liddel (Oratio funebris in memoriam Duncani Liddelli), 1614
