= William Moir =

Scottish mathematician (1602–1674)

William Moir MA
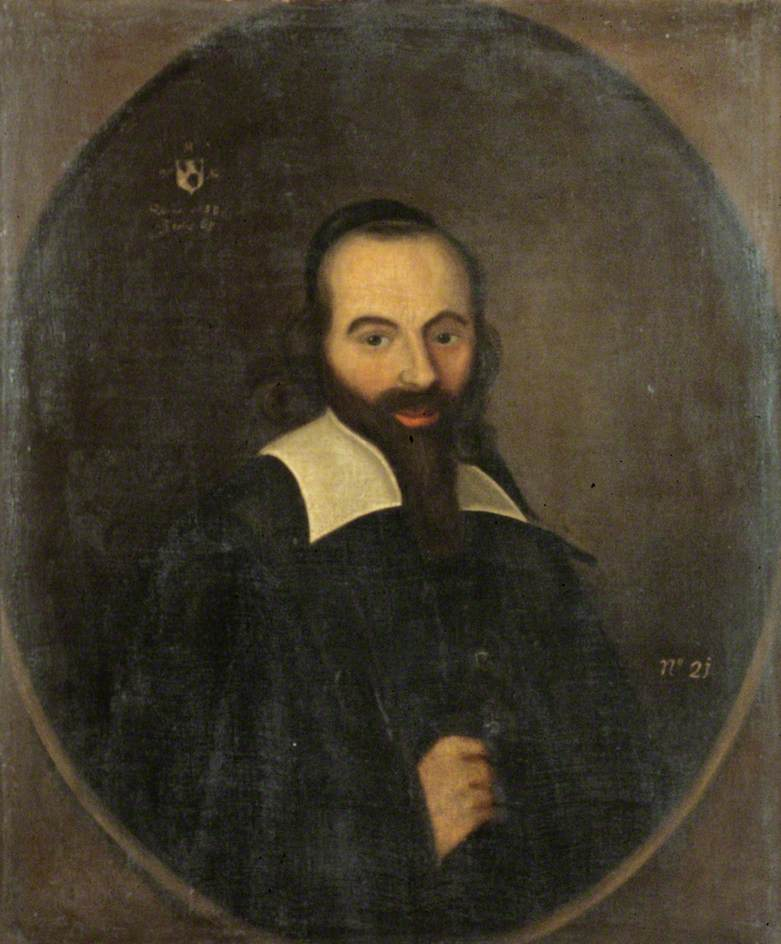
- Born: 1602; Aberdeen, Scotland
- Died: 15 November 1674 (aged 71–72); Aberdeen, Scotland
- Occupation: Principal of Marischal College
- Spouses: Jean Gordon; Jeane Forbes
- Children: 6

Academic background
- Education: Marischal College

William Moir (1602–1674) was a Scottish mathematician who was principal of Marischal College (now part of Aberdeen University) from 1649 to 1661.

== Life ==
He was born in Aberdeen the eldest child of William Moir of Scottistoun (1570-1623), treasurer of Aberdeen City Council, and his wife, Janet Rae (b. 1585). He studied at Marischal College graduating MA in 1616.

He was a Baillie in Aberdeen. In January 1641 he was appointed Professor of Mathematics at Marischal College. On 20 June 1649 he replaced Patrick Dun as Principal of Marischal College, also continuing his role as Professor of Mathematics. He resigned both posts in 1661.

He died in Aberdeen on 15 November 1674.

== Publications ==
- Geometry and the Mechanical Part of Mathematics

== Family ==
He married twice: firstly Jean Gordon, daughter of Gilbert Gordon of Gordon's Mill, by whom he had two sons and a daughter.

On 10 August 1628 he married Jeane Forbes (1605-1696) at the Kirk of St Nicholas in Aberdeen. By his second marriage he had one son and five daughters.
