= Marischal College =

Coordinates: 57.1495°N 2.0964°W

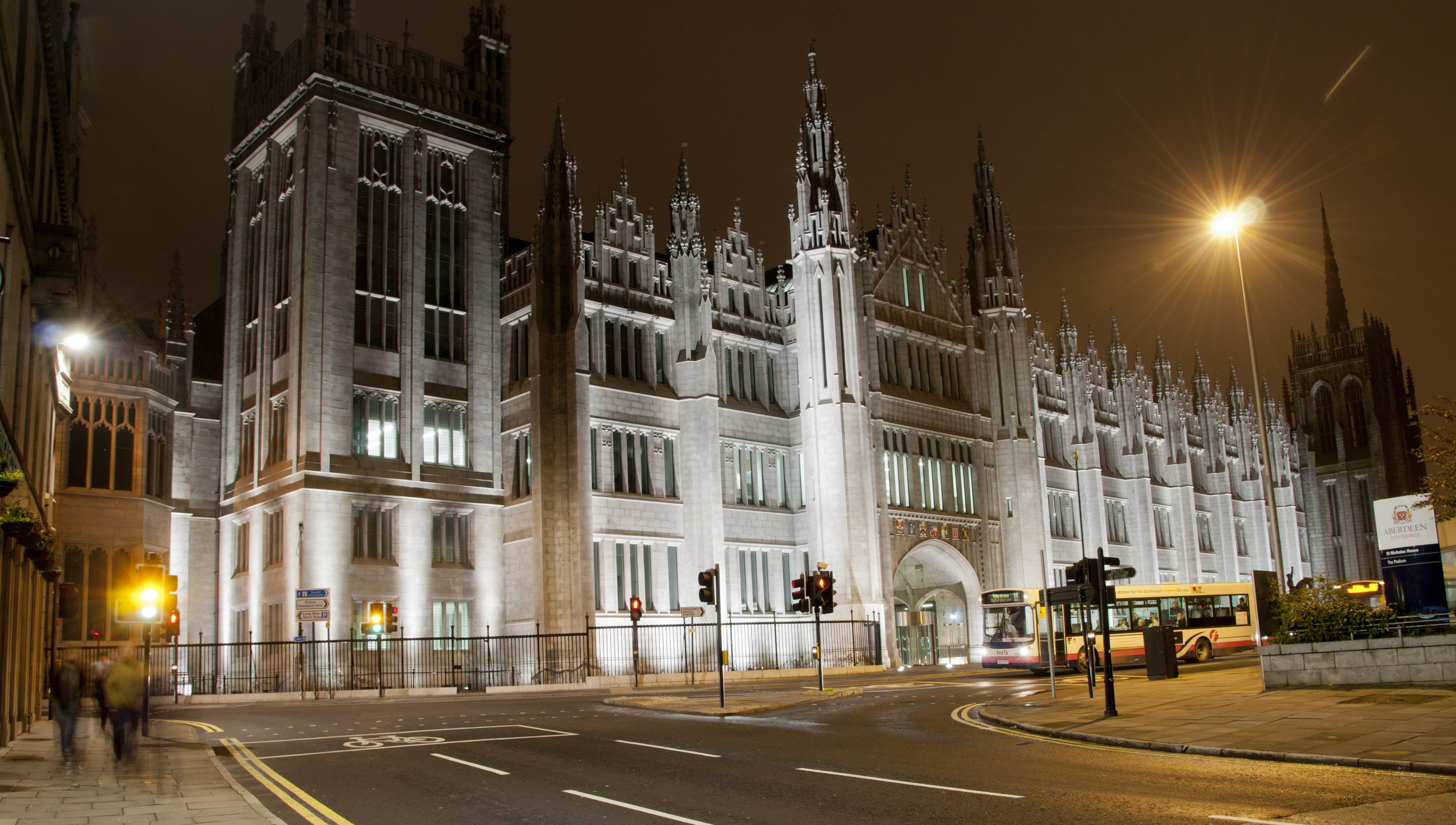
- Panoramic of the building following restoration

General information
- Status: Completed
- Type: Civic Building
- Architectural style: Gothic Revival architecture
- Location: Broad Street, Aberdeen, AB10 1AB, Aberdeen, Scotland
- Current tenants: Aberdeen City Council; University of Aberdeen
- Construction started: 1837
- Renovated: 2011
- Client: Aberdeen City Council
- Owner: University of Aberdeen
- Landlord: University of Aberdeen

Technical details
- Floor count: 5
- Floor area: 188,400 sq ft (17,500 m^{2})
- Lifts/elevators: 6

Design and construction
- Architects: Archibald Simpson (1837–44); Robert Mathieson (1873); W W Robertson (1888–89); Alexander Marshall Mackenzie (1893–1906)

Renovating team
- Architect: Holmes Partnership (2009–2011)
- Renovating firm: Safe Dem; Sir Robert McAlpine; Laing Traditional Masonry
- Structural engineer: Arup Scotland
- Services engineer: Wallace Whittle

Listed Building – Category A
- Designated: 12 January 1967
- Reference no.: LB20096

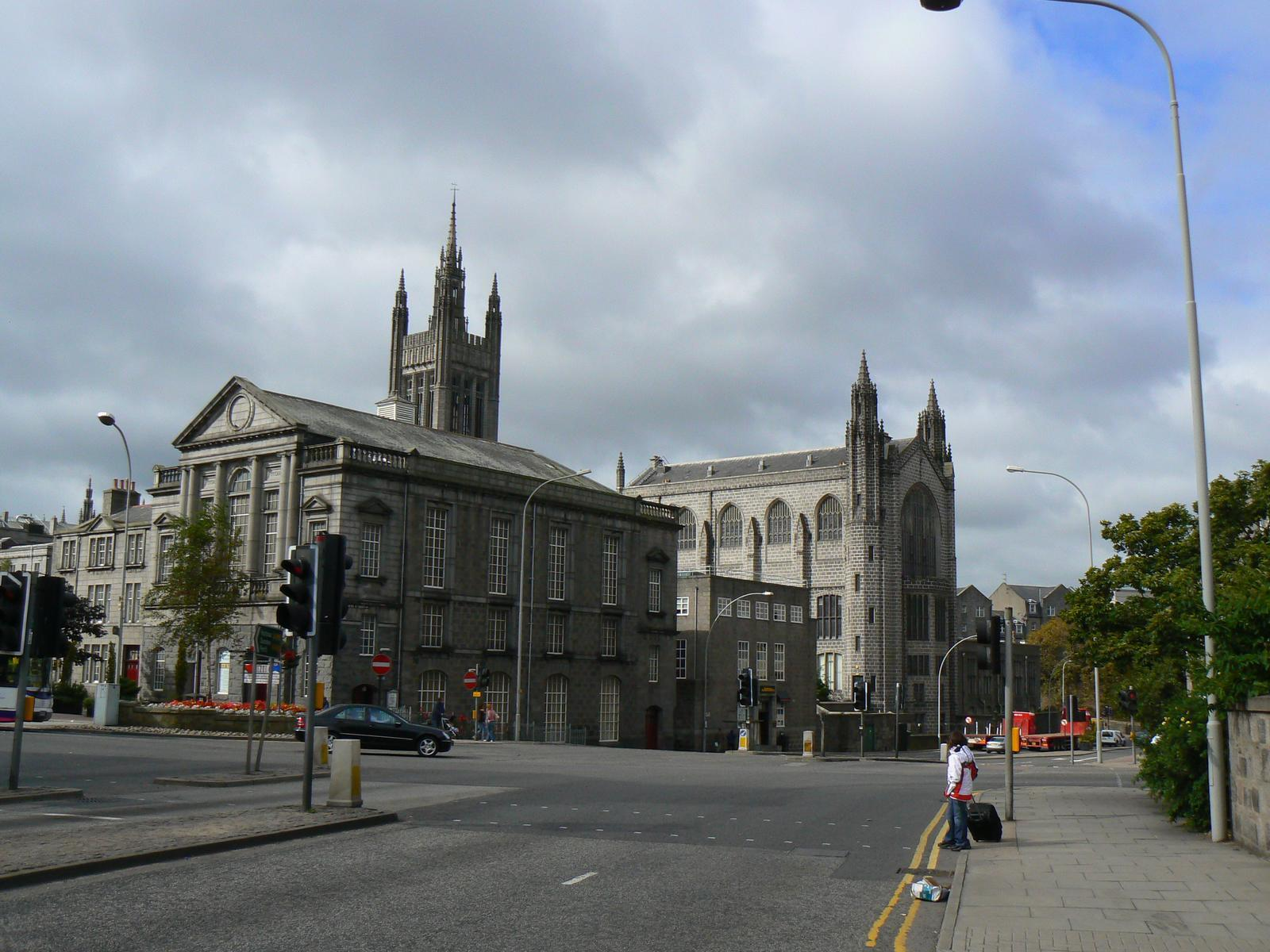
Marischal College from the rear, showing Mitchell Tower and Mitchell Hall

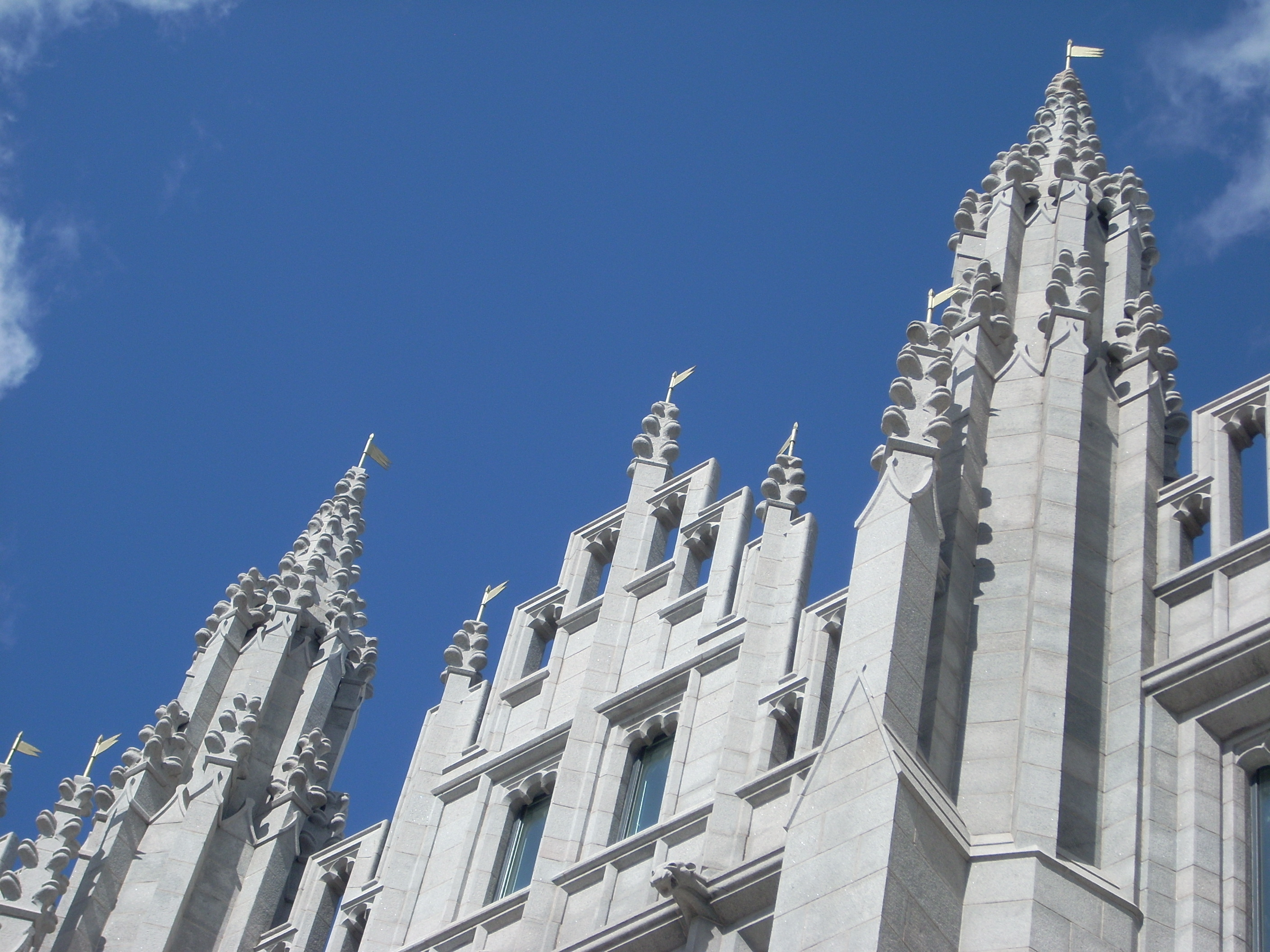
Detail of ornately carved granite pinnacles on the facade of Marischal College, following restoration

Marischal College (/ˈmɑːrʃəl/ MAR-shəl) was one of the two universities in Aberdeen between 1593 and 1860, alongside King's College, Aberdeen, with which it merged to form the University of Aberdeen in 1860. Its nineteenth-century building, first constructed between 1837 and 1844 and substantially extended between 1893 and 1906, has served since 2011 as the headquarters of Aberdeen City Council. Today, it provides corporate office space and public access to services, adjacent to the Town House, the city's historic seat of local government. It is the second largest granite building in the world, and has been described as the city's "most famous landmark".

The building was used by the University of Aberdeen for academic purposes until the mid-20th century and less and less until the early 2000s. During this period the building was frequently rebuilt and expanded. In the mid-to-late 20th century, teaching and academic activities at the university began to move to King's College or Foresterhill (for students of medicine), and by the early 21st century, the university concluded a new purpose for Marischal College was required. After a number of unsuccessful proposals, the majority of the building was leased to Aberdeen City Council to be redeveloped as office accommodation. The extensive redevelopment, including complete demolition of the internal spaces, was completed on schedule and significantly under budget; the building opened to the public in June 2011. The university has retained the Mitchell Hall and a number of other significant parts of the building for its own use, in addition to its museum stores (formerly the Marischal Museum).

== History ==
=== As an independent institution (1593–1860) ===
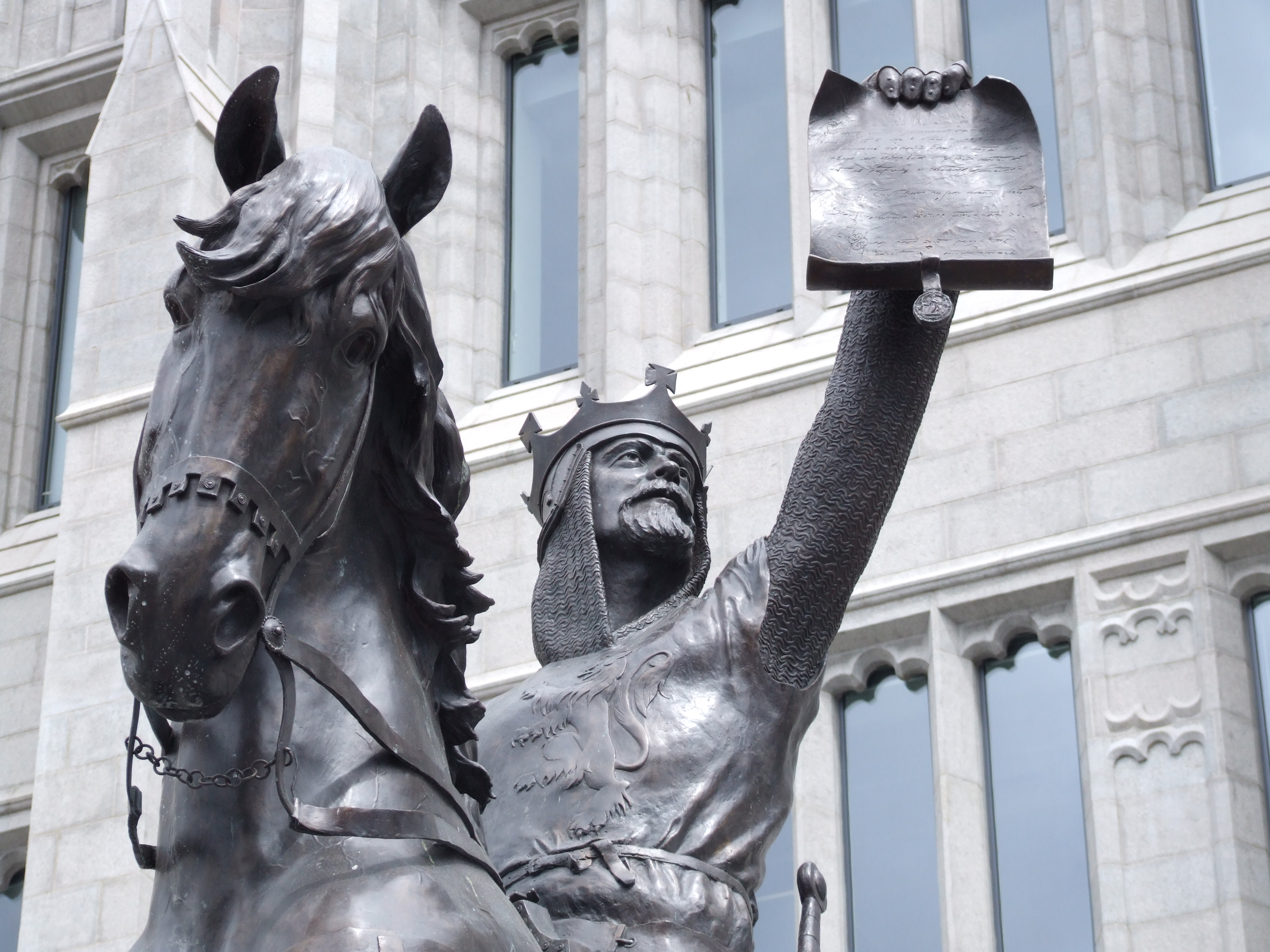
Statue of king Robert the Bruce in front of Marischal College.

"Marischal College and University of Aberdeen" was the formal name of the former university which occupied the present Marischal College site then in New Aberdeen. The College was founded in 1593 by George Keith, 5th Earl Marischal of Scotland. The original charter of the university was lost by the early 18th century, but two near-contemporary copies exist – one of which was accepted by the courts in 1756 as being authentic. In this charter, Marischal College is described variously as a gymnasium, collegium (college), academia (academy) and universitas (university).

Marischal was the second of Scotland's post-medieval "civic universities", following the University of Edinburgh, created without Papal bull and with a more modern structure and a greater resemblance to the Protestant arts colleges of continental Europe. As such, both Edinburgh and Marischal came to be known as the "Town Colleges" of their respective cities. The university was founded with the expressed aim of training clergy for the post-Reformation Kirk. Its Greek motto translates as "virtue is self-sufficient".

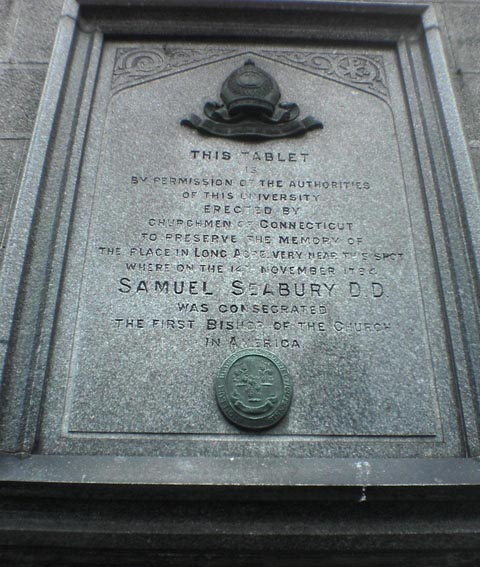
The plaque to Seabury's consecration

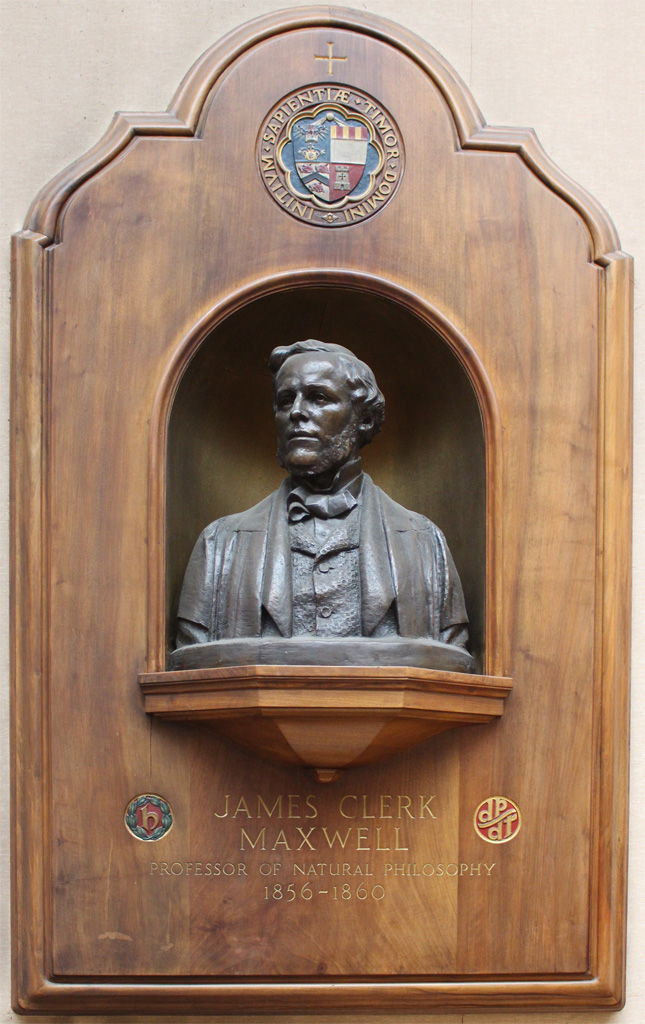
Bust of James Clerk Maxwell by Charles d'Orville Pilkington Jackson. Located in the Mitchell Hall of Marischal College

The College was constructed on the site of a medieval Franciscan friary, disused after the Reformation. This building was later replaced by a William Adam-designed building in the mid-18th century; however, this, together with the friary remains, were demolished entirely for the construction of the present building between 1835 and 1906, as was the Longacre home of Bishop John Skinner, site of the 1784 consecration of Samuel Seabury, now marked by a plaque on the east wall of the College's quadrangle.

James Clerk Maxwell, described as "the most famous and influential professor Aberdeen has ever had", was appointed as Professor of Natural Philosophy at Marischal College in 1856, but did not receive a professorship at the University of Aberdeen on its unification in 1860.

=== Within the University of Aberdeen (1860–2006) ===
The University of Aberdeen was created after the merger of Marischal College and King's College, Aberdeen in 1860 under the terms of the Universities (Scotland) Act 1858.

The following extract refers to this merger:

Universities of Kings College and Marischal College, Aberdeen. First Report of the Commissioners, 1838. 1837–38. Vol. XXXIII, 75p. [123] Chairman: Lord John Cunninghame.

The commissioners were in favour of a merger of the two colleges despite opposition from Kings College. They considered the unification as essential for the educational system of Northern Scotland although they disagreed with the proposed method of merger laid down by the last commission. The buildings of Marischal College were in very bad repair but new ones were under construction. Additions had been made in 1827 to Kings College buildings which were in a tolerable state of repair.

Throughout the 20th century, Marischal College housed all sciences and medicine. From about 1960, the college housed the Department of Molecular and Cell Biology and Medical school.

=== Use by Aberdeen City Council (since 2006) ===
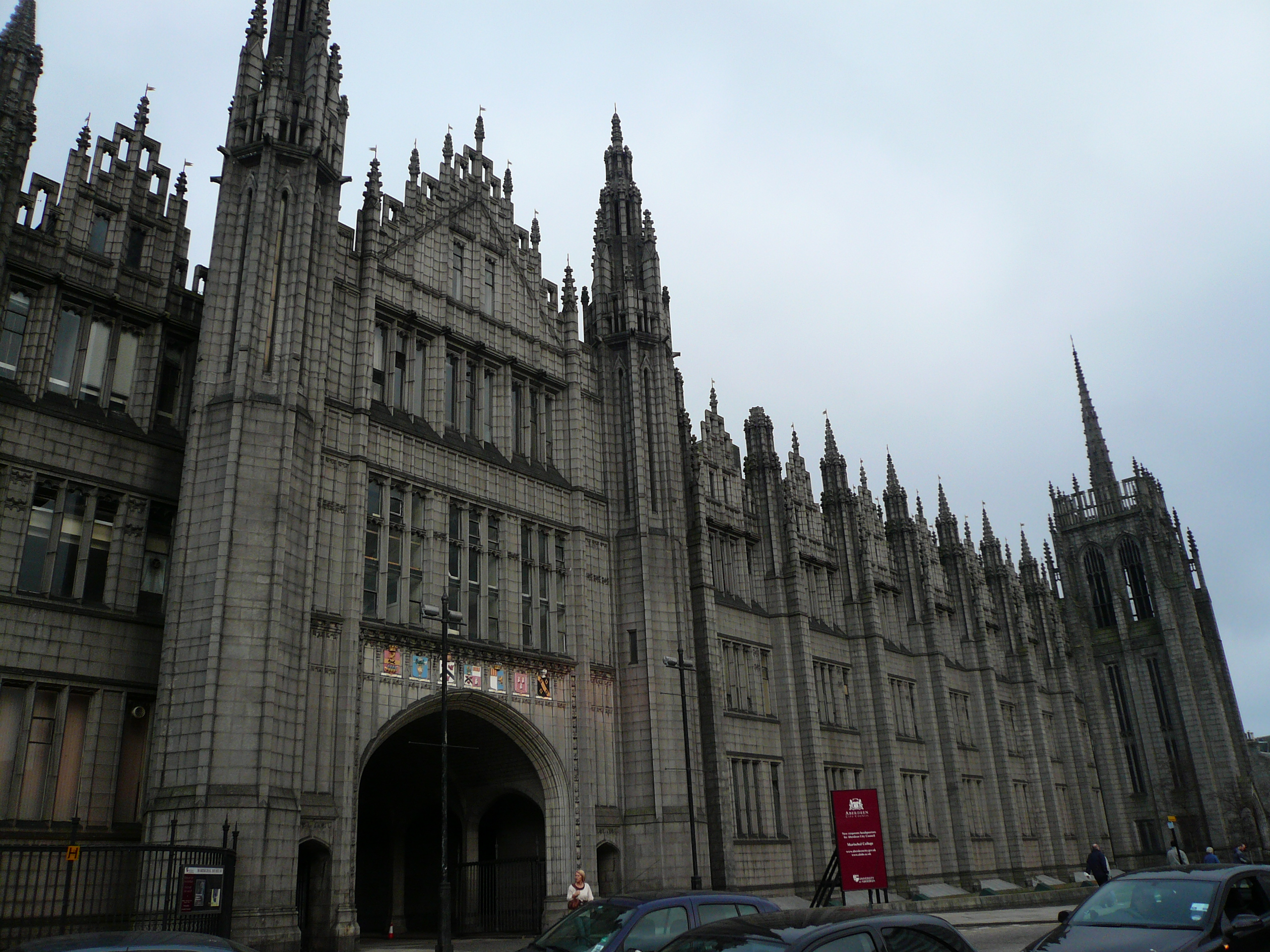
Prior to restoration

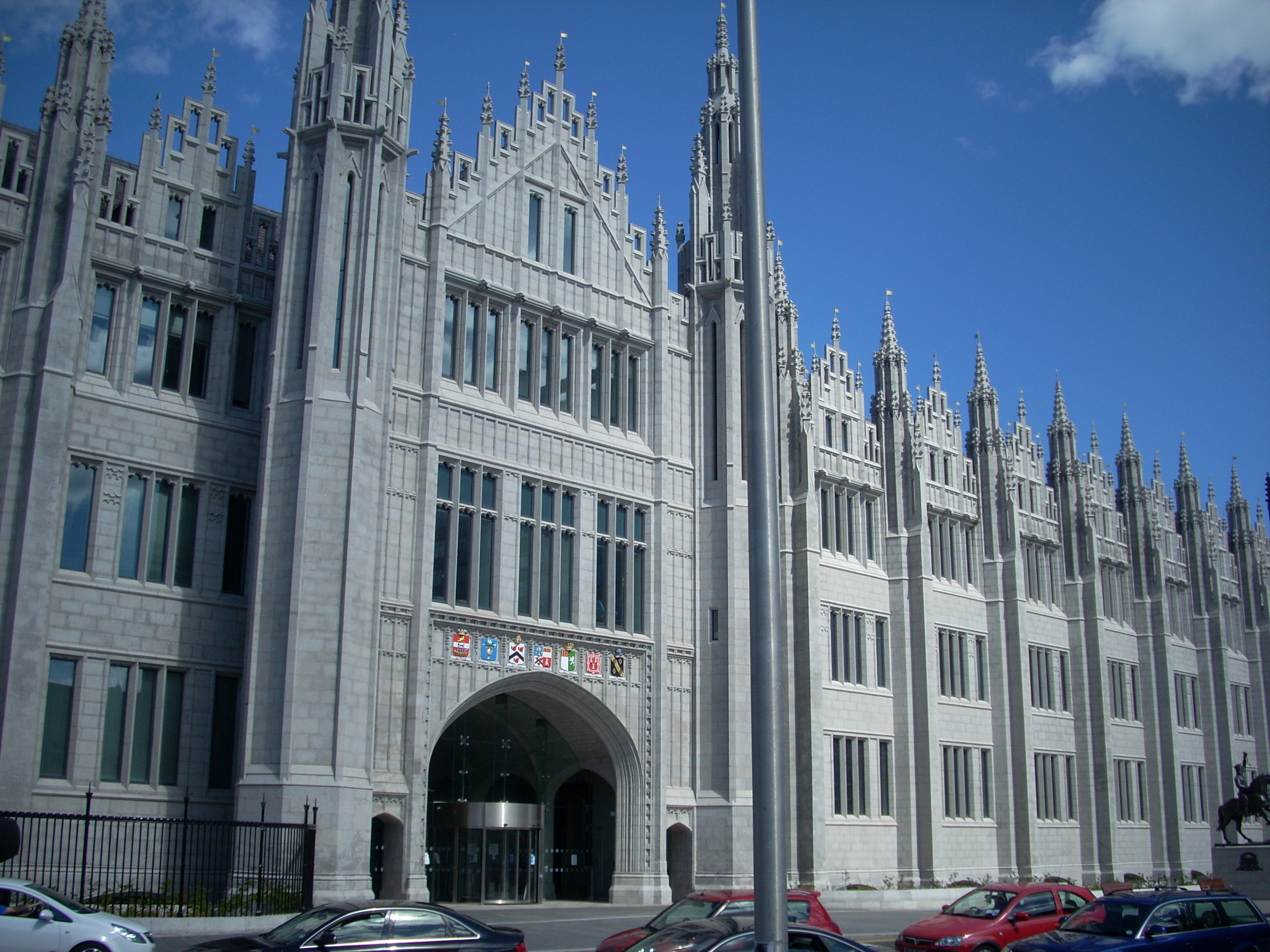
After restoration

Marischal College before and after restoration

For many years, much of the building was derelict as university departments had moved to King's College or Foresterhill years or decades before. Up to 2009, the only parts of the college building chiefly used by the university were the Mitchell Hall (for graduations, concerts and other events), the Marischal Museum, and the Anatomy department, which was used for 1st year medical students until March 2009. It was also home to the University's debating chamber.

In 2006 plans were announced for the renovation of the college as new administrative headquarters for the Council to replace the ageing St. Nicholas House across the street. The University leased the Marischal College site to Aberdeen City Council for 175 years in exchange for £4.7 million. Work began in 2009 and the newly refurbished Marischal College was opened in summer 2011. The internal spaces were completely demolished and replaced with a new internal structure which matched the existing walls and windows. The renovations restored the granite exterior, ornamentation and detailing, and provided new public space for citizens accessing council services and offices for council workers. The Council Chamber and democratic processes continue to be located at the Town House next door. The university retained the north wing comprising the Mitchell Hall, debating chamber and associated rooms, which were mothballed. In Spring 2011, the city erected outside Marischal College a statue of King Robert the Bruce on horseback, holding up a charter. Outside the College there is a large modern fountain, known as the "dancing fountain" for its alternating patterns. The fountain was briefly shut in 2019 due to high levels of bromine, but has since been turned back on. In 2024, as the council's occupancy of the building fell, it considered renting out office space.

In 2024, it was revealed that Mitchell Hall had sustained water damage, with timber and internal stonework "showing signs of deterioration", following the gutters becoming clogged. Later, it was announced that Mitchell Tower required urgent repair work, which was to begin in February 2025, which were expected to last for a year. Despite this, they were delayed for 18 months, finally announced to be beginning in August 2026.

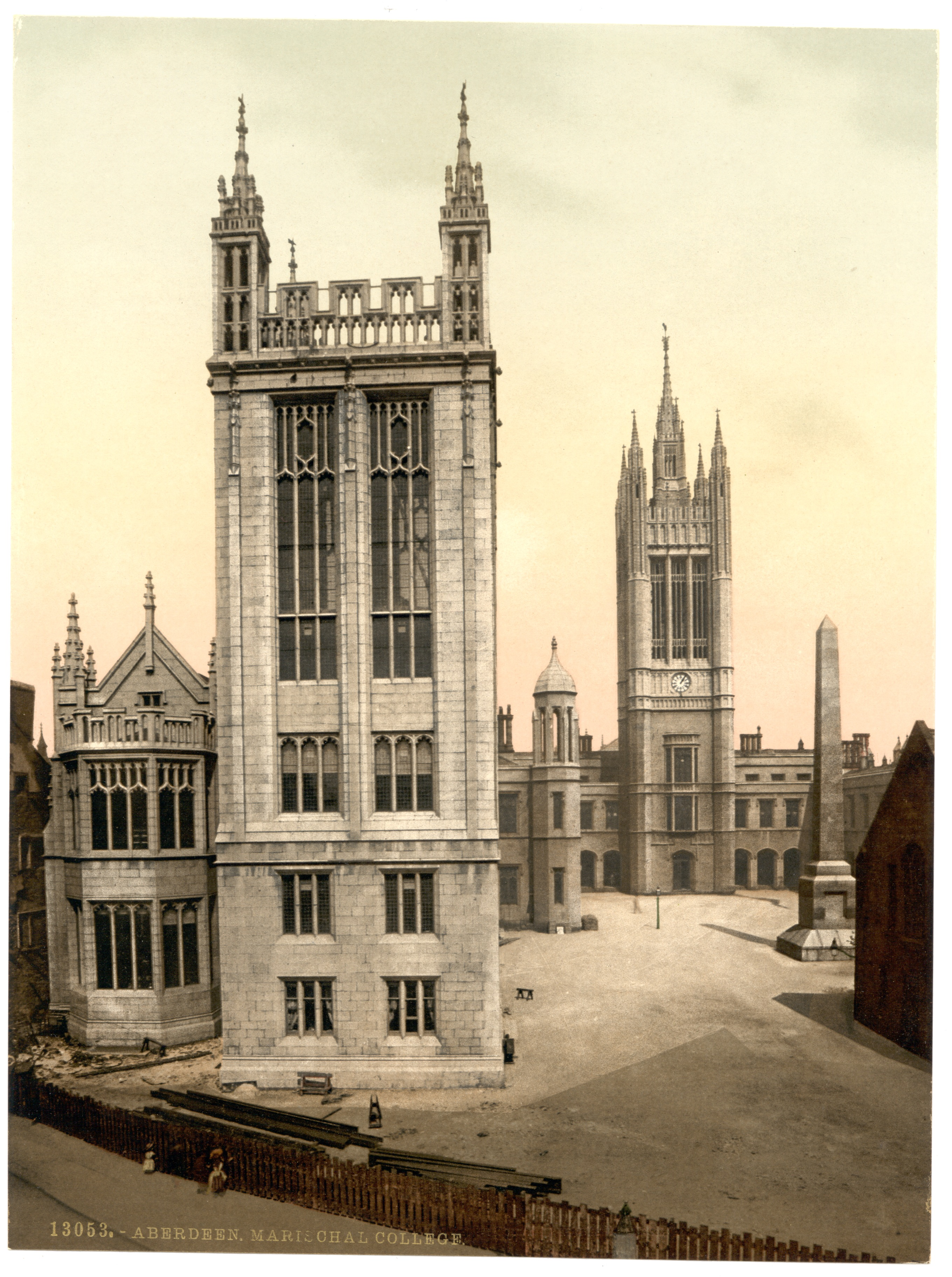
Marischal College, prior to the front being built

== The building ==
The building standing today, which replaced a number of older structures, was constructed between 1837 and 1844 by Aberdeen architect Archibald Simpson. This 1837 building formed a U-shaped quadrangle, with a small entrance via an archway amidst unrelated housing on the west side. The building was substantially extended between 1893 and 1905 by Alexander Marshall Mackenzie, and with its new "granite cage" front, enclosing the quadrangle, it became the second-largest granite building in the world (exceeded only by the Escorial Palace near Madrid).

Amongst the buildings demolished to make way for the new frontage of Marischal College at the turn of the 20th century, was Greyfriars Church, built in 1532 and incorporated as part of the College in 1593. Following a dispute regarding the conservation of this church, a new church building was constructed within the Marischal College complex. It is incorporated into the College frontage, which includes the southern tower, notable for being surmounted with a spire.

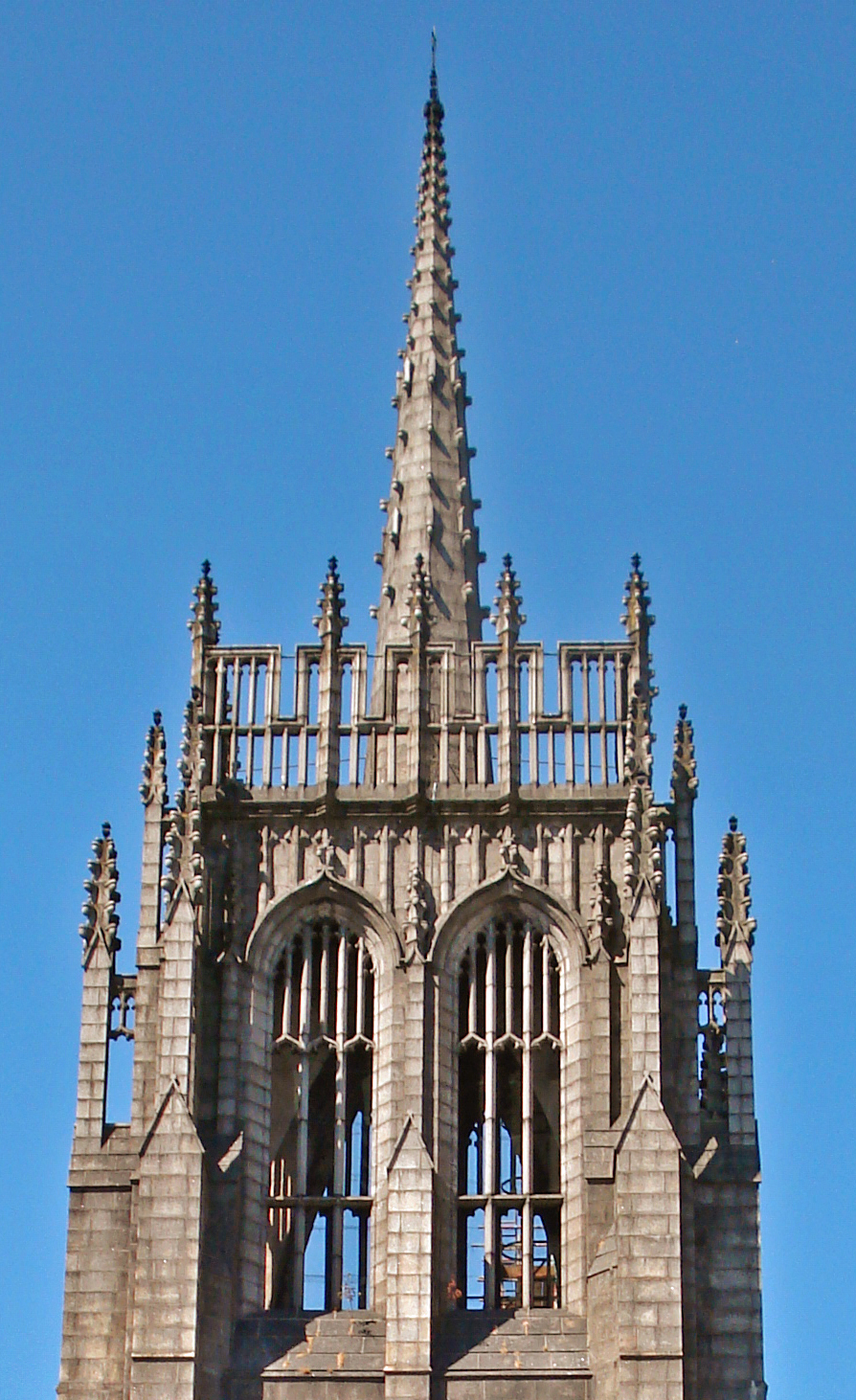
The southern tower of the Marischal College frontage – the spire of Greyfriars Church, Alexander Marshall Mackenzie, 1903

The Mitchell Hall, where University of Aberdeen graduations previously took place, was also built in the early 20th century. It is named after Dr Charles Mitchell, an alumnus of the university and a Tyneside shipbuilder. A large stained-glass window dominates the hall, executed by Thomas Ralph Spence of London and representing the university's history.

The building was commended by poet John Betjeman following a visit to Aberdeen in 1947:

"No-one can dismiss Marischal College, Aberdeen, when looking at the work of the present century. Wedged behind a huge town hall in an expensive and attractive mid-Victorian baronial style, I saw a cluster of silver-white pinnacles. I turned down a lane towards them, the front broadened out. Oh! Bigger than any cathedral, tower on tower, forests of pinnacles, a group of palatial buildings rivalled only by the Houses of Parliament at Westminster.

"This was the famous Marischal College. Imagine the Victorian tower with a spire on top, and all that well-grouped architecture below of lesser towers, and lines of pinnacles executed in the hardest white Kemnay granite and looking out over the grey-green North Sea and you have some idea of the first impression this gigantic building creates.

"It rises on top of a simple Gothic one designed by Simpson in 1840. But all these spires and towers and pinnacles are the work of this century and were designed by Sir Alexander Marshall Mackenzie. You have to see them to believe them."

There is an urban legend of unknown origin that Marischal College was Adolf Hitler's favourite building in the United Kingdom and that he would have liked to use it as a residence if the outcome of the Second World War had been different.

== Alumni ==
Notable alumni of Marischal College include:

- Alexander Bain (1818–1903), philosopher, educationalist, Professor of Logic and Lord Rector of University of Aberdeen
- James Blair (1656–1743), clergyman, founder of College of William and Mary
- Robert Brown (1773–1858), botanist; discoverer of Brownian Motion
- James Burnett, Lord Monboddo (1714–1799), jurist, philosopher, linguist; thinker on evolution
- Patrick Copland (1749–1822), mathematician and astronomer
- Robert Davidson (1804–1894), inventor of first electric locomotive (1837)
- Charles D. F. Phillips (1830–1904), British medical doctor and author.
- Sir William Duff Gibbon (1837–1919), Ceylonese tea planter and politician
- Sir David Gill (1843–1914), astrophotographer
- James Gregory (1638–1675), Scottish mathematician and astronomer
- Cosmo Gordon (1736–1800) MP, co-founder of the Royal Society of Edinburgh, twice Rector of the College
- Robert Hunter (1823–1897), missionary, geologist and editor of Encyclopædic Dictionary
- Alexander Keith (1792–1880), Church of Scotland theologian
- Nathaniel Lardner (1684–1768), English theologian
- Sir John Mowlem Burt (1845–1918), contractor
- Sir James Outram, 1st Baronet (1803–1863), general, known for his role in suppressing the Indian Rebellion of 1857, buried in Westminster Abbey
- William Pargeter (1760–1810), medical doctor who wrote about mental illness
- Sir Alexander Ogston (1844–1929), Scottish surgeon; discoverer of Staphylococcus aureus
- Rev John Skinner (1721–1807), poet, historian and ecclesiastic.
- William Trail (1746–1831), mathematician.

== Principals ==
- Robert Howie from 1593 to 1598
- Gilbert Gray 1598 to 1614
- Andrew Adie 1616 to 1619
- William Forbes 1620 to 1621
- Patrick Dun 1621 to 1649
- William Moir 1649 to 1661
- James Leslie 1661 to 1678
- Robert Paterson 1678 to 1717
- Thomas Blackwell 1717 to 1728
- John Osborne 1728 to 1748
- Thomas Blackwell (son) 1748 to 1757
- Robert Pollock 1757 to 1759
- George Campbell 1758 to 1796
- William Laurence Brown 1796 to 1830
- Daniel Dewar 1832 to 1860

In 1860 the college merged with King's College, Aberdeen to create the University of Aberdeen.

== See also ==
- List of early modern universities in Europe
