= John Osborne (principal) =

John Osbourne MA
- Born: 1690; Aberdeen
- Died: 19 August 1748 (aged 57–58); Aberdeen
- Occupation: Principal of Marischal College
- Spouse: Margaret Mitchell
- Children: 7

Academic background
- Education: Marischal College

John Osborne, also written Osborn (1690–19 August 1748) was a Church of Scotland minister who served as principal of Marischal College in Aberdeen from 1728 to 1748.

== Life ==
He was born in 1690 in or near Aberdeen and educated at Marischal College graduating MA in 1708.

He trained as a Church of Scotland minister and was licensed to preach by the Presbytery of Aberdeen in February 1713 but had to wait three years for his first charge, as third charge in Aberdeen in April 1716.

On 8 June 1728 he took on the additional role as principal of Marischal College succeeding Thomas Blackwell.

He died in Aberdeen on 19 August 1748. He is buried in the churchyard of the Kirk of St Nicholas in the city centre. His position as principal was filled by Thomas Blackwell, son of his predecessor.

== Family ==
In August 1718 he married Margaret Mitchell (d.1752). They had four daughters and three sons, including Alexander Osborne, comptroller of customs in Aberdeen, and Jane Osborne (d.1786) who married William Mowat of Colpnay, Provost of Aberdeen.

== Artistic recognition ==
His portrait (artist unknown) is held by the Seven Incorporated Trades of Aberdeen.
