= Thomas Blackwell (principal) =

Church of Scotland minister and college head

- Born: 1660; Glasgow
- Died: 3 October 1728 (aged 67–68)
- Occupation: Principal of Marischal College
- Spouse: Christian Johnston
- Children: 12 (7 surviving to adulthood)

Academic background
- Education: University of Glasgow

Thomas Blackwell (1660–1728) was a Church of Scotland minister who was principal of Marischal College in Aberdeen from 1717 to 1728. After being inducted to the ministry of Paisley in 1694, Blackwell became involved in witchfinding and was instrumental in the persecution and trials of the Paisley Witches.

== Life ==
He was born in 1660 the son of Thomas Blackwell calenderer in Glasgow and his wife, Janet Knox. He was educated at Glasgow University training as a minister. He was licensed to preach as a Church of Scotland minister by the Presbytery of Glasgow in February 1693.

He was ordained at Paisley Abbey in August 1694. In November 1700 he translated to "second charge" of the Kirk of St Nicholas in Aberdeen. In May 1711 he moved to first charge of Greyfriars Church, Aberdeen. He was awarded a Doctor of Divinity (DD) and adopted a second role as Professor of Divinity at Marischal College in the same year.

From 1714 to 1728 he was Patron of the Seven Incorporated Trades of Aberdeen.

On 30 September 1717 he succeeded Robert Paterson as principal of Marischal College. His nomination was the first to be done by the crown, as the Earl Marischal has forfeited his rights to do so. A senior figure in the Church of Scotland, he travelled to London with William Carstares of Edinburgh University to discuss the Patronage and Toleration Act in the run up to the Act of Union 1707. This led to the Church Patronage (Scotland) Act 1711.

He died on 3 October 1728.

== Family ==
He married Christian Johnston (d.1749), daughter of John Johnston of Glasgow.

Their children included:

- Thomas Blackwell (also a future principal of Marischal College)
- George Blackwell, minister of Bathgate
- Alexander Blackwell, tortured and beheaded in Sweden in 1747
- Janet, married George Fordyce, Provost of Aberdeen parents to Sir William Fordyce, David Fordyce, James Fordyce and Alexander Fordyce
- Christian Blackwell (d.1784), married John French, advocate in Aberdeen

== Publications ==
- Ratio Sacra (1710)
- Schema Sacra (1710)
- Methodus Evangelica (1712)
- Representation against the Bill for Restoring Patronages (1712)

== Artistic recognition ==
His portrait (artist unknown) is held by the Seven Incorporated Trades of Aberdeen.
