= William Fordyce =

Scottish physician (1724–1792)

Sir William Fordyce (1724 – 4 December 1792) was a Scottish physician.

== Life ==
The son of Provost George Fordyce (1663-1733) of Aberdeen, and brother of David Fordyce, was born at Aberdeen in 1724, and educated at Marischal College; also serving a medical pupilage with a local practitioner and with his brother John at Uppingham in 1743. His mother Janet Blackwell was daughter of Rev Dr Thomas Blackwell principal of Marischal College. Her siblings included Thomas Blackwell and Alexander Blackwell.

He was admitted a member of the Medical Society in Edinburgh on 22 December 1744. He then volunteered for the army during the War of the Austrian Succession which ended in 1748, and obtained an appointment as surgeon to the Guards, with whom he served in three campaigns.

Probably after the peace he travelled and studied in France. He was at Turin in 1750. While retaining his connection with the army, he entered on general practice in London, and this and the growing fame of his brothers gained him introduction. In 1770 he was created M.D. at Cambridge by royal mandate, and was admitted licentiate of the Royal College of Physicians on 10 April 1786. He was knighted by George III in 1787, and in the same year became Fellow of the Royal Society.

He aided his brother Alexander Fordyce to his rise of fortune, and suffered a heavy loss when he failed, taking upon himself the burden of his brother James Fordyce's loss also. The Society of Arts voted him a gold medal for his work on rhubarb. He died at Brook Street, Grosvenor Square, after a long illness, on 4 December 1792, aged 68. At the time of his death he was lord rector of Marischal College, to which he left £1,000.

== Works ==
Fordyce's works (all published in London) are:

- A Review of the Venereal Disease and its Remedies, 1767, fifth edition 1785; German translation, Altenburg, 1769.
- A New Inquiry into the Causes, Symptoms, and Cure of Putrid and Inflammatory Fevers, with an Appendix on the Hectic Fever and on the Ulcerated Sore Throat, 1773, fourth edition 1777; German translation, Leipzig, 1774.
- The Great Importance and Proper Method of Cultivating and Curing Rhubarb in Britain for Medical Uses, 1784.
- Fragmenta Chirurgica et Medica, 1784.
- Letter to Sir John Sinclair on the Virtues of Muriatic Acid in curing Putrid Diseases, 1790.
