= Henrietta Fordyce =

Scottish-born governess

- portrait by George Willison
- Born: Henrietta Cumming; 14 February 1734; Edinburgh
- Died: 10 January 1823 (aged 88); Bath
- Occupation: governess
- Employer: James Lindsay, 5th Earl of Balcarres's family
- Spouse: Reverend James Fordyce
- Children: none

Henrietta Fordyce born Henrietta Cumming or Henrietta Cummyng (14 February 1734 – 10 January 1823) was a Scottish-born governess.

== Life ==
Fordyce was born in Edinburgh. Her father James Cuming soon died and it was her mother Katharine (born Cowan) who arranged her home education. When she was twelve her mother died and she was left with no prospect of an advantageous marriage as she had no dowry. One of her aunts took her in and that was where she came to the attention of Anne Dalrymple, countess of Balcarres. Anne and her husband James Lindsay, 5th Earl of Balcarres had a large family and Anne was known for her harsh parenthood. She once ordered that one of her misbehaving sons should be thrown in a pond three times.

She moved to Balcarres in Fife where she was the governess to Anne, Margaret, and Elizabeth Lindsay. Anne later noted that Fordyce was unusual. She refused to eat at all until she was allowed to eat with the family. Fordyce wanted to look after her charges and she was annoyed when she was offered payment. The second daughter, Margaret, married Alexander Fordyce who was a banker.

She served for a decade. She met the Scottish minister James Fordyce (Alexander's brother) who was known for his Sermons to Young Women which he had published in 1766. They married in 1771, the Reverend Fordyce was based in London and they lived there until the early 1780s.

They lived briefly in Southampton before they settled in Bath.

== Death and legacy ==
Fordyce died in Bath in 1823. Based on her correspondence with Alicia Cockburn, the latter is credited with establishing Fordyce's notability. An anonymous "Memoir of the late Mrs. Henrietta Fordyce" was published in 1823, but it is considered unreliable.
