= William Duncan (philosopher) =

Scottish natural philosopher and classicist

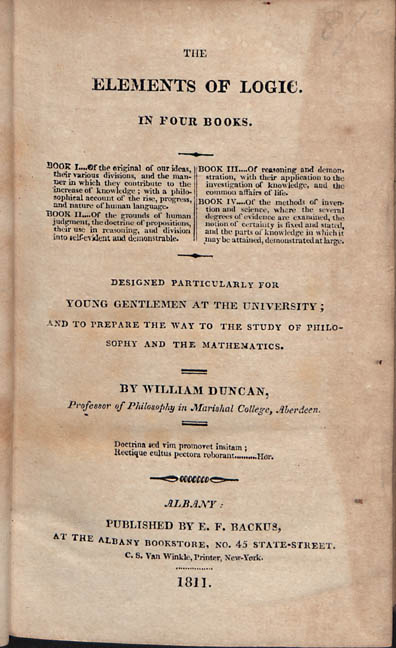
The elements of logic, 1811

William Duncan (1717 in Aberdeen – 1760 in Aberdeen) was a Scottish natural philosopher and classicist, professor of natural philosophy at Marischal College, Aberdeen.

Educated at Marischal College, Aberdeen, he was appointed professor of natural philosophy there in 1752. His popular Elements of Logic, first published in Robert Dodsley's The Preceptor (2 vols, London, 1748), combined a Lockean theory of knowledge with syllogistic logic. He translated the Commentaries of Julius Caesar and orations of Cicero; at his death, translations of Plutarch's Lives and a continuation of Thomas Blackwell's Court of Augustus were left unfinished.

== Works ==
- The Elements of Logick in Four Books, London: R. Dodsley, 1748.
- The Commentaries of Caesar, Translated into English, to Which Is Prefixed, A Discourse Concerning the Roman Art of War, London: J. & R. Tonson, 1753.
- Cicero's Select Orations, Translated into English, with the Original Latin, from the Best Editions, in the Opposite Page, and Notes Historical, Critical, and Explanatory, London: G. Keith, 1756.

Duncan is also sometimes miscredited with The Elements of Moral Philosophy written by David Fordyce.
