= Elizabeth Blackwell (illustrator) =

Scottish illustrator, writer (1699–1758)

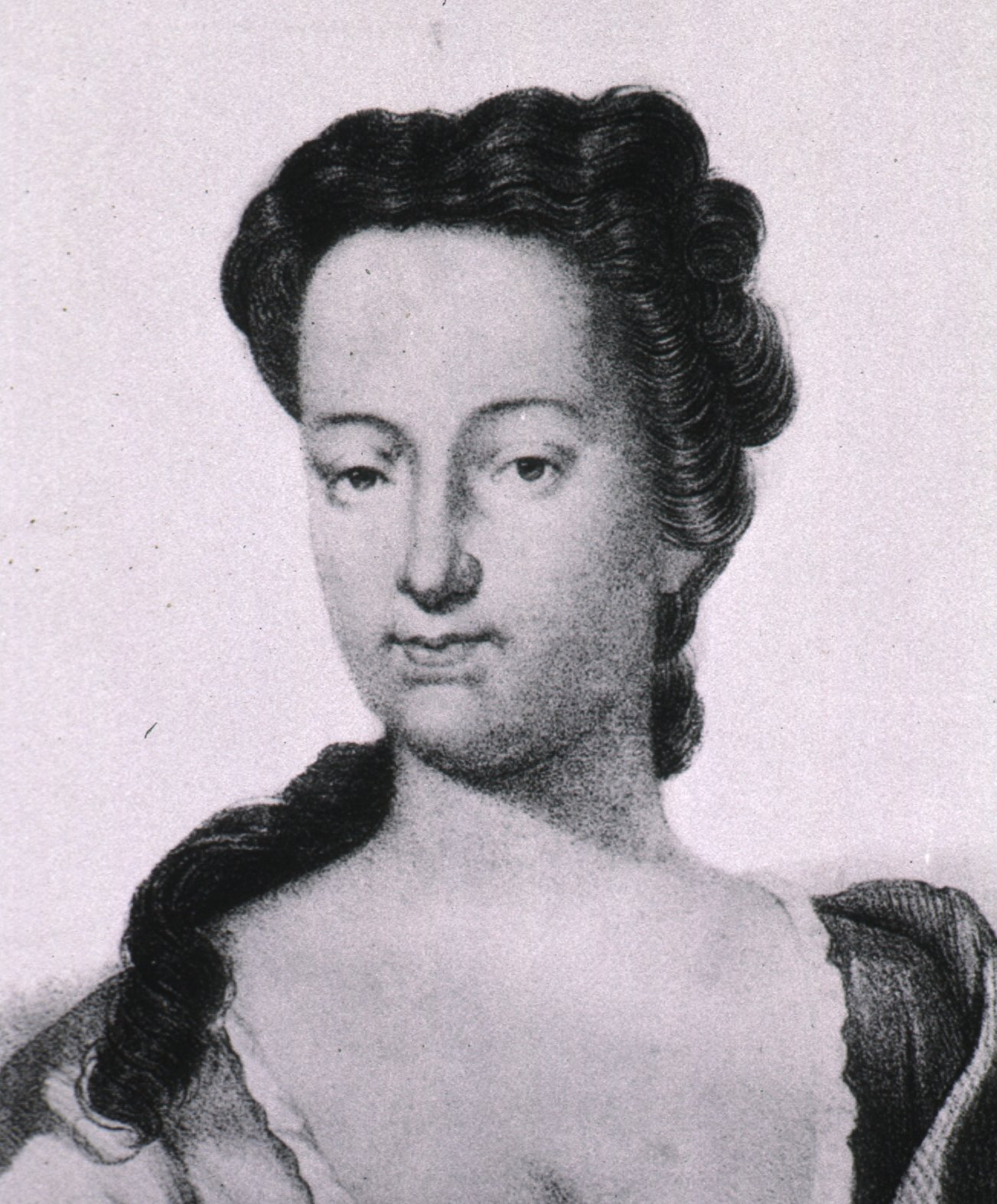
- Born: 1699
- Died: 1758 (aged 58–59)
- Known for: illustrator
- Spouse: Alexander Blackwell

Elizabeth Blackwell (23 April 1699 – 1758) was a botanical illustrator best known as the drawer and engraver of the plates for A Curious Herbal, published between 1737 and 1739. It illustrated medicinal plants in a reference work for the use of physicians and apothecaries.

== Life ==
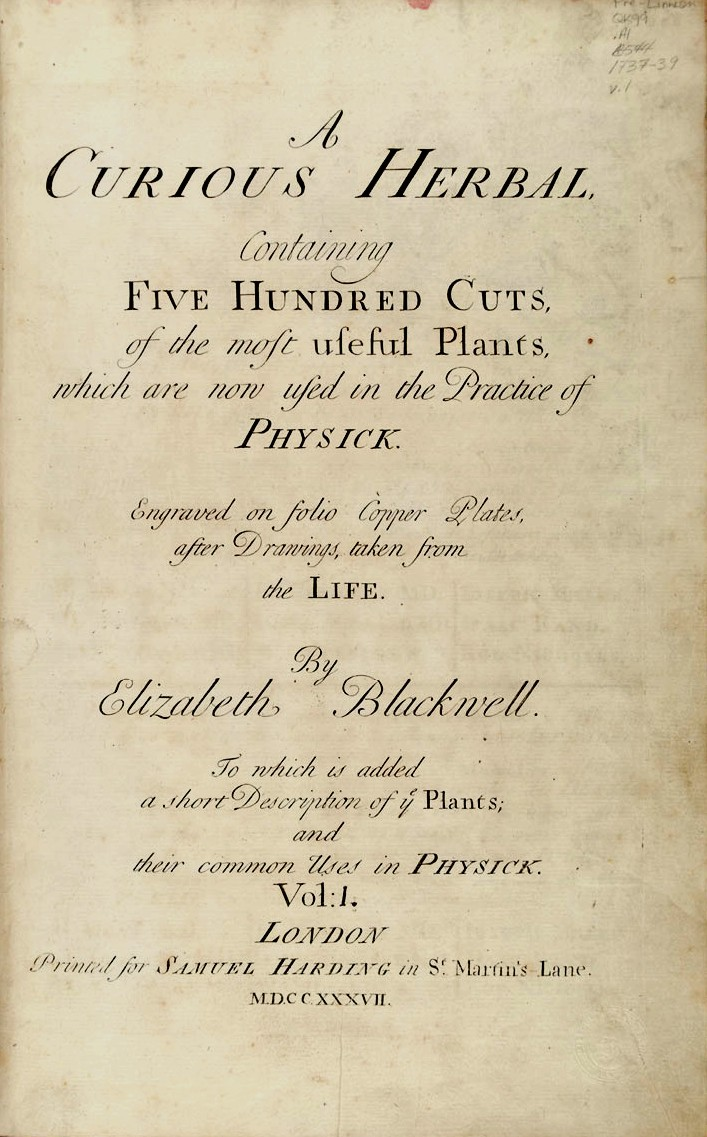

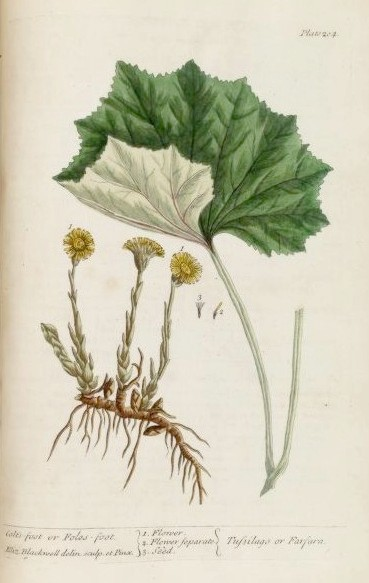
Figure 1: Illustration from A Curious Herbal

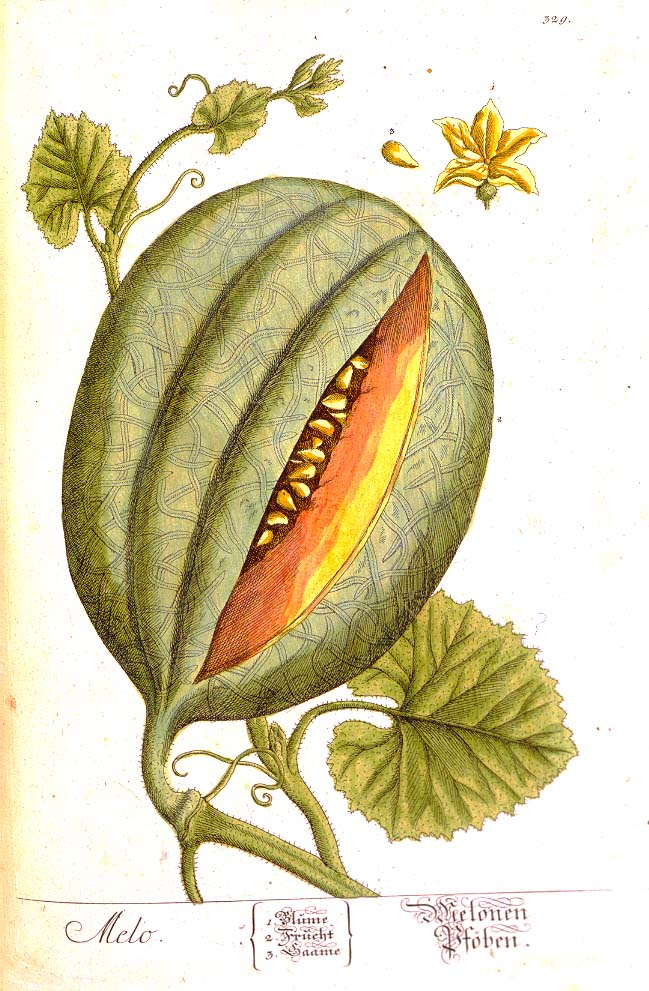
Figure 2: Illustration from Herbarium Blackwellianum

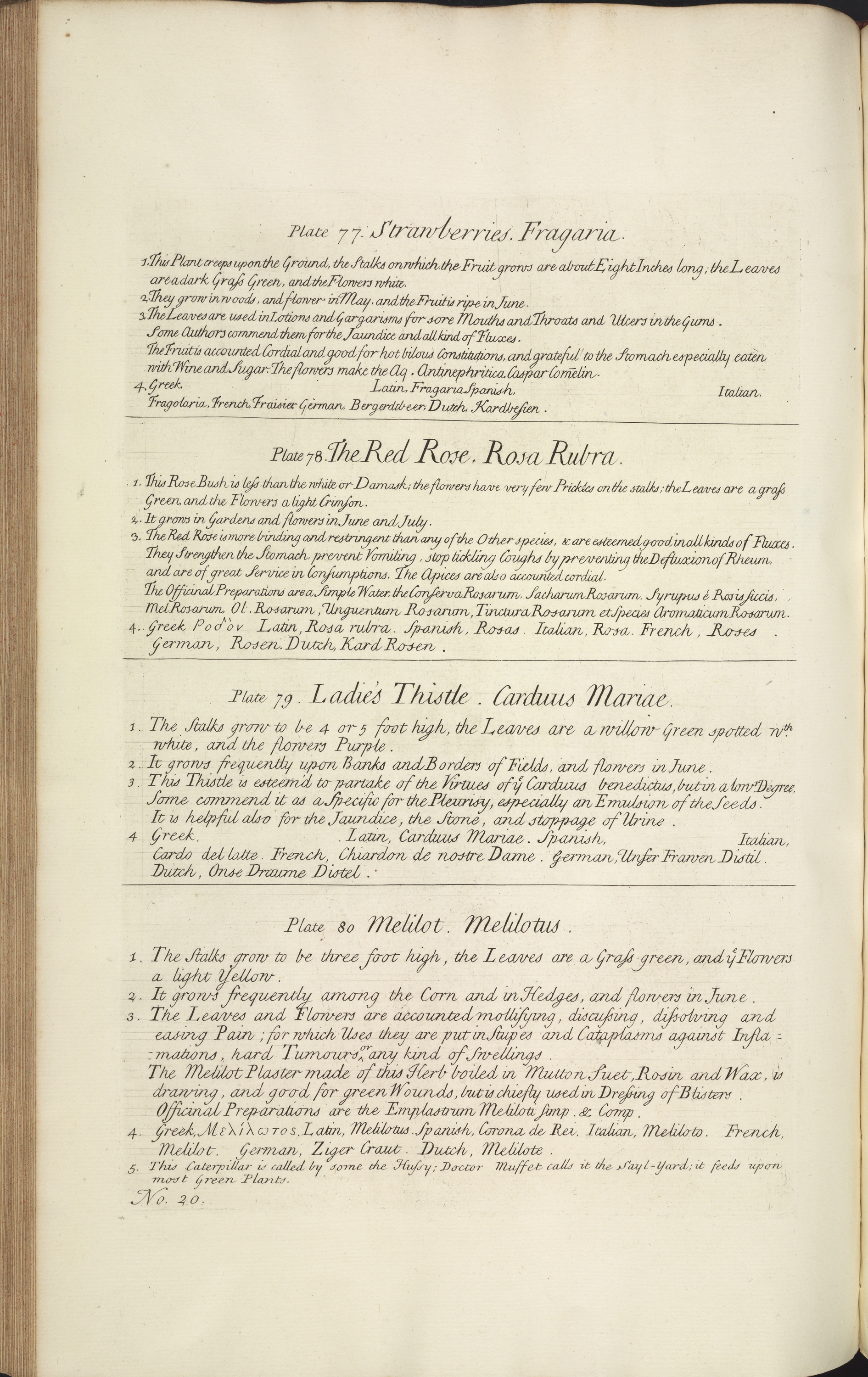
Figure 3: A page from A Curious Herbal detailing how individual plants were described

Elizabeth Simpson was born in Aberdeen, the daughter of the painter Leonard Simpson. As a young woman, she was educated in art, music, and languages, and she would have received a substantial dowry from her father.

Simpson married Alexander Blackwell, as he was completing his education at Marischal College. She fled Aberdeen when questions arose regarding his qualifications. In fear that he could be charged for illegal practice of medicine, they moved to London. Accounts record that she studied as a midwife with William Smellie, but did not pursue this career due to 'the ignorance and low character of the women who at that time followed the same calling'. Alexander continued his questionable decision-making in London. He became associated with a publishing firm and established his own printing house in 1730 despite not belonging to a guild or serving the required apprenticeship. Alexander was charged with flouting trade rules and heavily fined. These heavy fines and Alexander's lavish spending habits led to his subsequent stay in Highgate Prison for two years.

== Accomplishments ==
Left to her own devices with no income, a house to run, and a child to raise, Blackwell decided to put to use her training as an artist. She learned that a herbal was needed to depict and describe exotic plants from the New World. She decided that she could illustrate it and that Alexander, given his medical background, could write the descriptions of the plants. As she completed the drawings, Blackwell would take them to her husband's cell, where he supplied the correct names in Latin, Greek, Italian, Spanish, Dutch, and German.

Blackwell was an amateur in botany. To compensate for this, she was aided by Isaac Rand, then curator of the Chelsea Physic Garden, where many of these new plants were under cultivation. At Rand's suggestion, she relocated near the Garden so she could draw the plants from life. In addition to the drawings, Blackwell engraved the copper printing plates for the 500 images and text and hand-colored the printed illustrations. It was common for artists to hire a professional engraver to create plates, but Blackwell took it upon herself in order to save this expense. Pages of written descriptions for each plant were added that included a physical description, growth habit, where and when the plant could be located, how each part could be used, and the other names for the plant provided by Blackwell’s husband.

The task of creating A Curious Herbal was immense and took a number of years to complete. A Curious Herbal, containing five hundred cuts of the most useful plants which are now used in the Practise of Physick, to which is added a short description of ye plants and their common uses in Physick was issued in weekly parts, each containing four plates and accompanying text over 125 weeks between 1737 and 1739. The first volume contained 250 plates and was published in 1737. The imprint read "London printed for Samuel Harding in St Martin’s Lane," and the new publication was announced in the Gentleman’s Magazine for July 1737.

In addition to creating illustrations and engravings, Blackwell marketed the book through journals and by word of mouth. The Country Journal: or the Craftsman for 6 May 1738 records the publication of the first volume of 252 plates of plants. It noted further that "a further 132 plates of plants for the second volume" had been published and that "the whole 500 will be finished in eight months"; a dedication to Dr. John Johnstoun is dated 17 January 1739. The advertisement in The Country Journal closes with a warning against a spurious and base copy of the work sold by Samuel Harding. One such copy had been made by a group of printers and engravers who were prosecuted by Alexander for duplicating some of her plates.

The first printing of A Curious Herbal met moderate success because of the meticulous quality of the illustrations and the great need for an updated herbal. Physicians and apothecaries acclaimed the work, and it received a commendation from the Royal College of Physicians. A second edition was printed 20 years later in a revised and enlarged format in Nuremberg by Dr. Christoph Jacob Trew, a botanist and physician, between 1757 and 1773.

Revenue from the book led to Alexander's release from prison. Within a short while debts again accumulated, forcing the couple to sell half of the publication rights to the book to John Nourse, a bookseller in London. In April 1747, the Blackwells sold their remaining half share of the publication rights, all remaining copies of the book, and all of the copper plates to Nourse to settle an outstanding debt. Alexander also became involved in several unsuccessful business ventures and eventually left the family to start a new life in Sweden. Alexander's trail of bad decisions led him to death by execution for conspiracy against the Swedish Crown on 9 August 1747, as Elizabeth was leaving London to join him.

Little is known of Blackwell's later years, though she possibly continued her original training as a midwife. She was buried on 27 October 1758, and her grave is at All Saints Church in Chelsea, London. Her name is one of four on a plaque in Chelsea Old Church commemorating Chelsea women distinguished by their learning and piety. She remained loyal to Alexander throughout, even sharing royalties with him from the sale of additional book rights.

A genus of plants named after her, Blackwellia, is of the class Dodecandria Pentagynia. There are six subspecies of Blackwellia: Blackwellia Panticulata, Blackwellia Glauca, Blackwellia Nipaulensis, Blackwellia Axillaris, Blackwellia Siralis, and Blackwellia Padifolia. These species are native to Réunion, Mauritius, Nepal, Madagascar, Peru, and China, respectively.

In the 1920s, playwright Constance Smedley wrote a play titled The Curious Herbal about Blackwell's work, though it has not been performed since the 1940s.

== Influences ==
Blackwell was likely influenced by the work of Maria Sibylla Merian, who illustrated garden flowers in her work Neues Blumen Buch, among other works. Joseph Miller's Botanicum Officinale; or a Compendious Herbal: giving an account of all such plants as are now used in the Practice of Physick, also influenced her, and many of the descriptions of medical properties of plants were taken from it. Miller’s work and similar publications were not illustrated, so her illustrated herbal was needed. Some of the illustrations in A Curious Herbal were taken from H.A. van Rheede tot Draakestein’s Hortus indicus malabaricus, and she credited and assigned these plates to him.

Blackwell depicted plants in the style typical of botanical illustration from the sixteenth century onwards. Sparked by the European Renaissance and popularized by illustrators such as Leonhart Fuchs, this style was meant to give the viewer an understanding of the forms of organism from a scientific as well as artistic perspective. Her illustrations often depict entire plants, including the rhizomes or root systems. She also includes separate flower structures, meant to mimic the appearance of scientific dissections.

== Reception ==
Blackwell presented a copy of her work to the Royal College of Physicians, who ‘so greatly approved of it that they not only made her a handsome present, but also gave her an ample testimonial, in writing, of their approbation of her work’. This present took the form of a commendation from Thomas Pellet, the President of the Royal College of Physicians, which appears in most copies of A Curious Herbal. The commendation is dated 1 July 1737 and features an engraving of Theophrastus and Dioscorides along with the coat of arms of the Royal College of Physicians.

While Blackwell's work in Curious Herbal is referenced in many histories of botany, she appears to receive scant attention from the Society of Apothecaries, which owned the Chelsea Physic Garden where she undertook her work on the herbal. The more scholarly works on botany, particularly those of Wilfrid Blunt, dismiss her contribution to botany as not particularly scientific, rather making an illustrated list of medicinal plants available to the medical profession and the more enlightened public of the time. During the preliminary stages of her work on A Curious Herbal, she submitted drawings to Sir Hans Sloane, president of the Royal Society in 1712, and Dr. Richard Mead, a notable physician, who encouraged her to pursue publication. She also gained the attention of Dr. James Douglas (1675 – 1742), the obstetrician, who considered her to be one of the hundred most famous women of history. The skill and diligence she displayed in engraving and hand-painting all the plates herself should also be remembered, as should her dedication to freeing her husband from debtor's prison."

Blackwell's A Curious Herbal has been featured on the British Library website as a "classic of botanical illustration." The book is available to view online using the Turning the Pages system. Preserved in the British Library's manuscript collections are several transactions made during 1737 and 1747 regarding the purchase of shares and a copyright deed to the herbal from the Blackwells by John Nourse.

Examples of Blackwell's work were included in ‘Print and Prejudice: Women Printmakers, 1700–1930’, an exhibition at the Victoria and Albert Museum in London, 2022 – 23. In 2023, Abbeville Press published the first modern edition of A Curious Herbal, featuring essays by Marta McDowell and Janet Stiles Tyson.

== Publications ==
- A curious herbal: containing five hundred cuts, of the most useful plants, which are now used in the practice of physick engraved on folio copper plates, after drawings taken from the life / by Elizabeth Blackwell. To which is added a short description of the plants and their common uses in physick. (London, 1737 – 1739), her great herbal, which contained engravings drawn from specimens in the Chelsea Physic Garden
- Herbarium Blackwellianum emendatum et auctum, id est, Elisabethae Blackwell collectio stirpium :quae in pharmacopoliis ad medicum usum asseruantur, quarum descriptio et vires ex Anglico idiomate in Latinum conversae sistuntur figurae maximam partem ad naturale exemplar emendantur floris fructusque partium repraesentatione augentur et probatis botanicorum nominibus illustrentur. Cum praefatione Tit. Pl. D.D. Christophori Iacobi Trew; excudit figuras pinxit atque in aes incidit Nicolaus Fridericus Eisenbergerus ... By : Blackwell, Elizabeth, – Eisenberger, Nicolaus Friedrich, – Trew, Christoph Jacob, – Christiani de Launoy. – Io. Iosephi Fleischmanni. Publication : Norimbergae : Typis Io. Iosephi Fleischmanni, 1750 – 1773.online and download
- A Curious Herbal (2023) full-color facsimile edition, edited by Marta McDowell, published by Abbeville Press

== Gallery ==
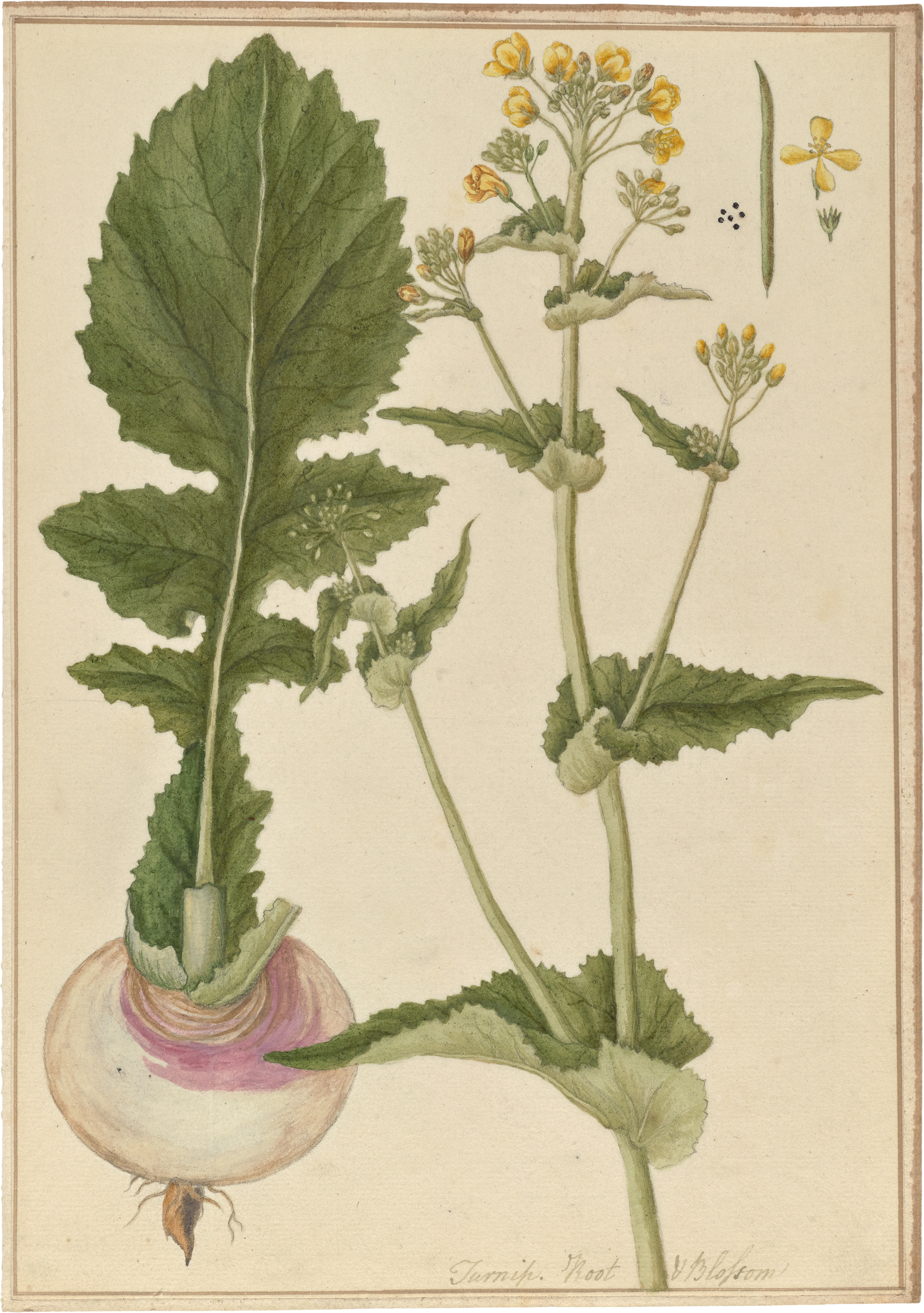
Figure 3

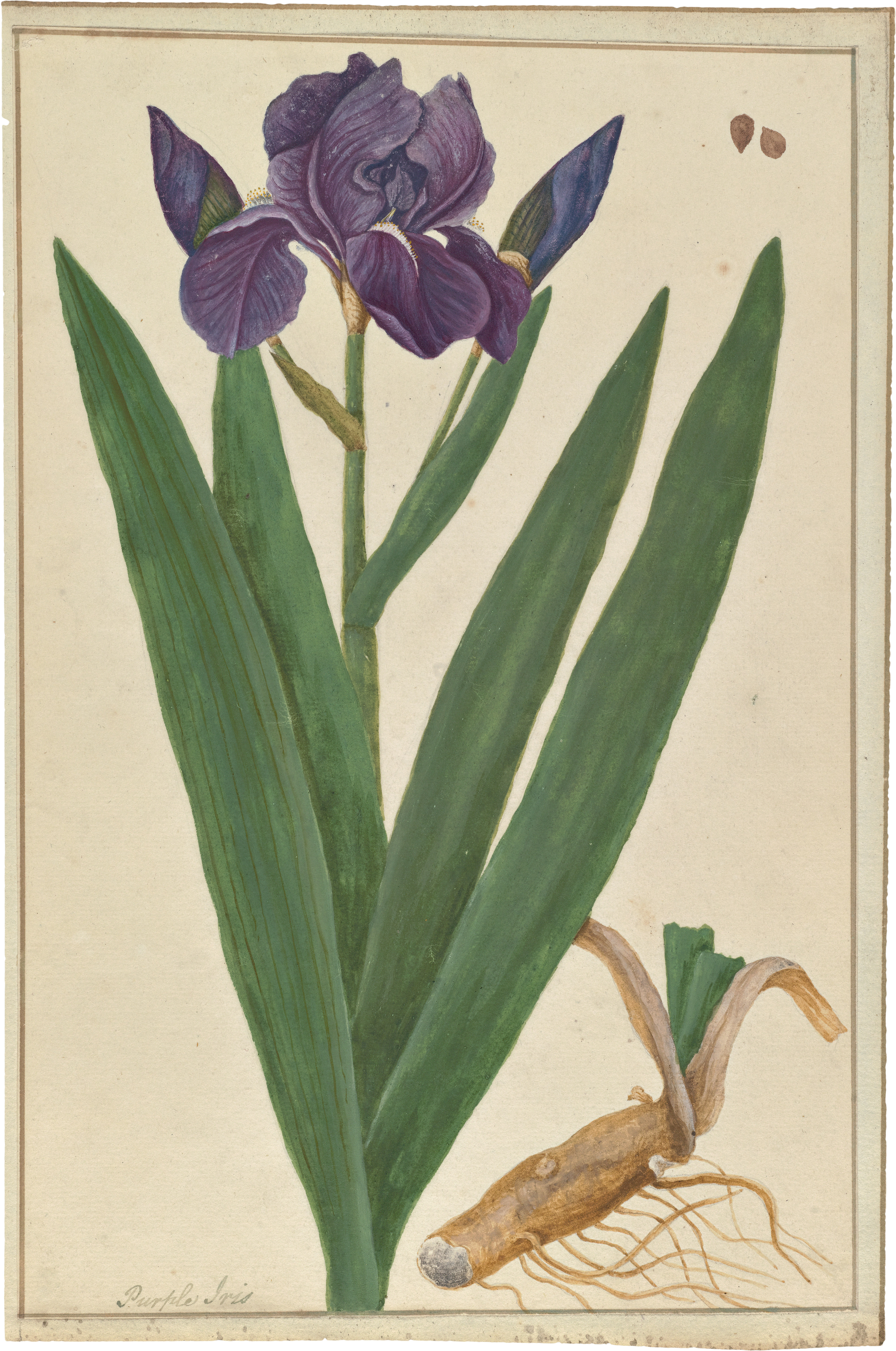
Figure 4

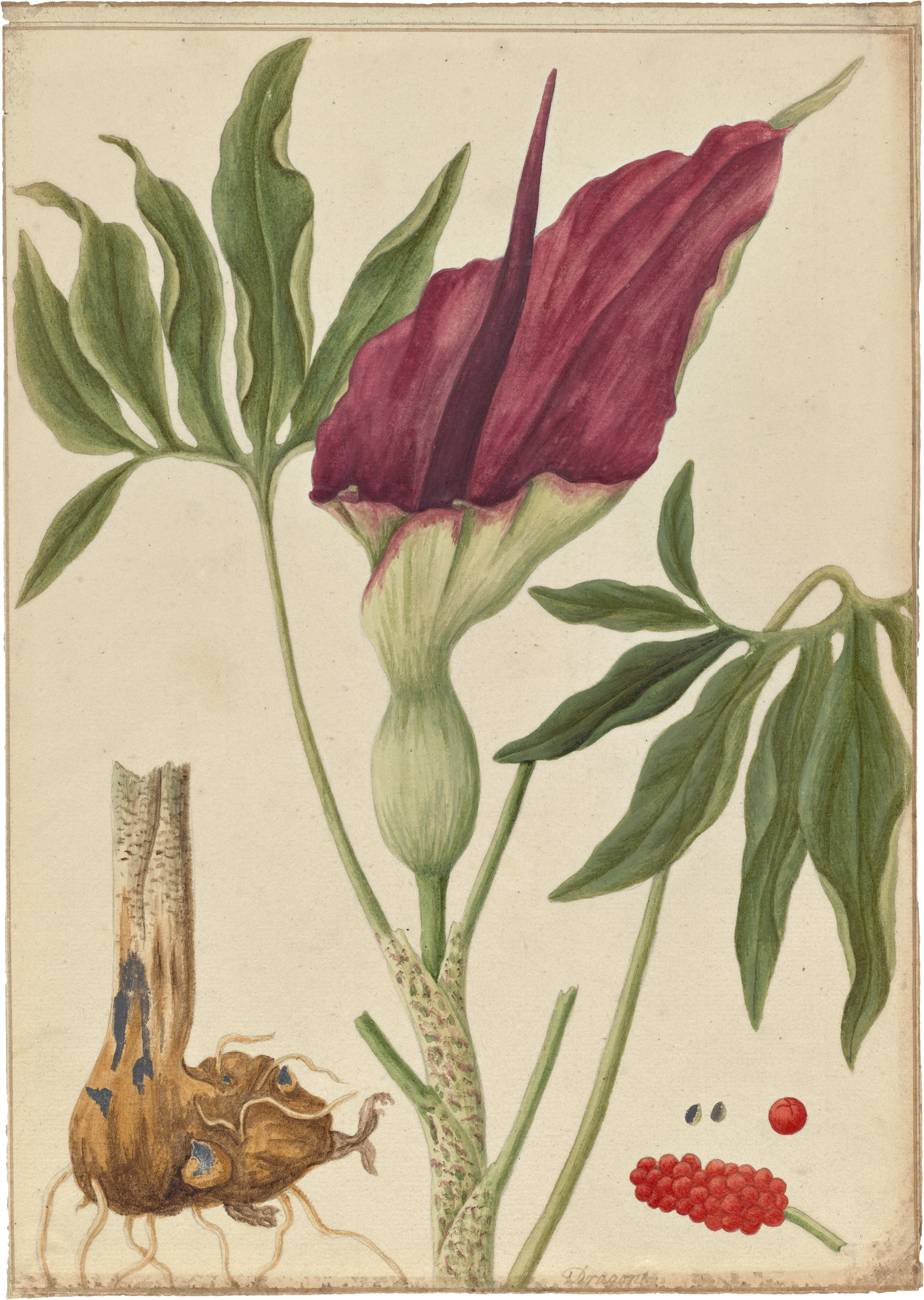
Figure 5

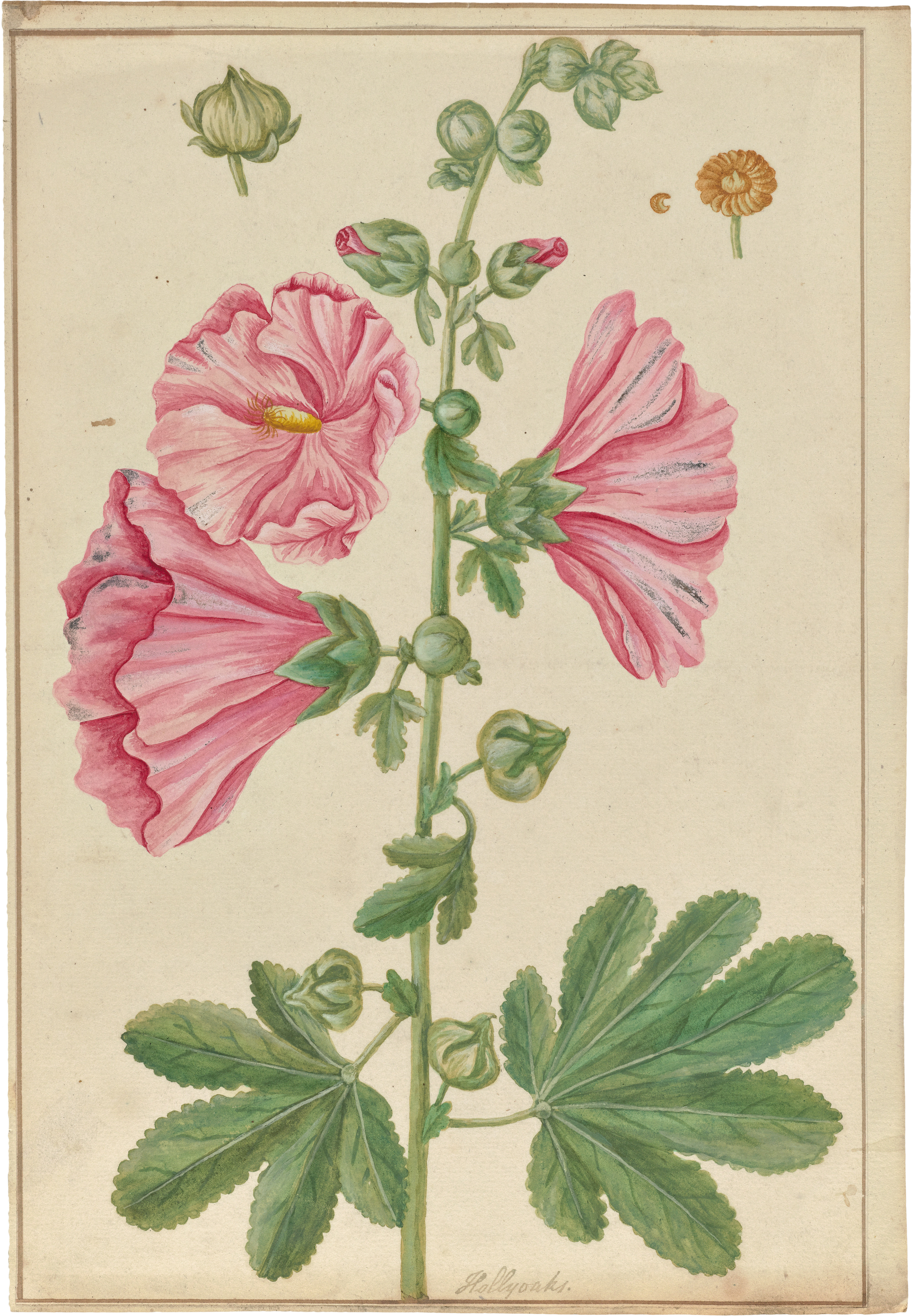
Figure 6
