= Elizabeth Isabella Spence =

Scottish writer

Elizabeth Isabelle Spence
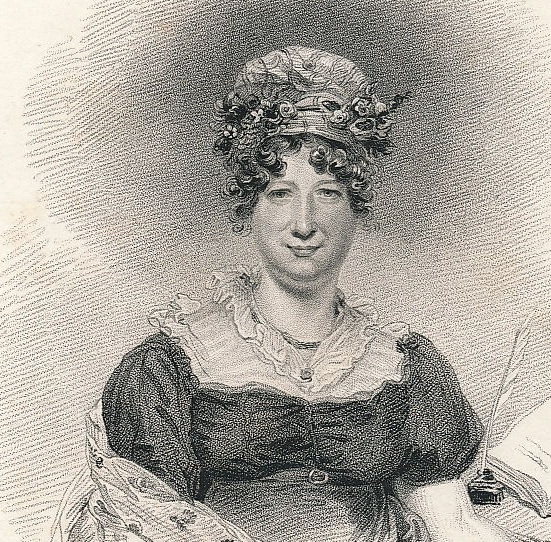
- from La Belle Assemblée (No. 185).
- Born: 12 January 1768; Dunkeld
- Died: 27 July 1832 (aged 64); Chelsea

Elizabeth Isabella Spence (12 January 1768 – 27 July 1832) was a Scottish novelist and travel writer.

== Life ==
Spence was born in Dunkeld in 1768 and after being orphaned she went to live with an aunt and uncle in London, but they also died and she had to quickly turn her hobby of writing into a means of income. Her uncle was James Fordyce, who was the author of Sermons to Young Women, and her work was said to reflect this moral approach. She initially wrote sentimental fiction but then turned her attention to travel writing.

Her approach was to travel during summer composing letters and anecdotes about her travels which she then later edited into a book. She is sometimes noted because she sent notes to other women writers of the time. Spence's travel writing attracted some criticism in her lifetime, but Pam Perkins has commented that Spence emphasised that inspirational effect that the Scottish landscape could have on women in the time. Spence witnessed the countryside being opened up and she made literary references where the scenery was mentioned in contemporary culture like the novels of Sir Walter Scott.

Spence died in Chelsea in 1832 of a stroke.

== Works ==
- The Nobility of the Heart, 1804
- The Wedding Day, 1807
- Summer Excursions through part of England and Wales, 1809
- Sketches of the Present Manners, Custom, and Scenery of Scotland, 1811
- Commemorative Feelings, 1812
- The Curate and his Daughter: a Cornish Tale, 1813
- The Spanish Guitar, 1815
- A Traveller's Tale of the Last Century, 1819
- Old Stories, 1822
- How to be rid of a Wife, 1823
- Dame Rebecca Berry, 1827
- Tales of Welsh Society and Scenery
