= John Lumsden (disambiguation) =

John Lumsden was an Irish physician.

John Lumsden may also refer to:

- John Lumsden (footballer) (1960–2016), Scottish footballer
- John McVeagh Lumsden
- John Lumsden of the Lumsden Baronets
- John Lumsden of Auchinleck Moderator of the General Assembly of the Church of Scotland in 1746
