= John Lumsden of Auchinleck =

John Lumsden of Auchinleck (1692–1770) was an 18th-century minister who was Professor of Divinity at King's College, Aberdeen and served as Moderator of the General Assembly in 1746.

== Life ==
He was born around 1692/3 the second son of Alexander Lumsden schoolmaster at Chapel of Garioch living at Auchinleck near New Deer.

In July 1721 he was ordained as minister of Keithhall in place of Francis Dauney. In 1727 he was translated to Banchory. In 1735 he moved to be Professor of Divinity at King's College, Aberdeen holding this position for over 40 years.

In 1746 he succeeded the William Wishart as Moderator of the General Assembly of the Church of Scotland the highest position in the Scottish Church. He was succeeded in turn by Robert Kinloch.

He was a friend or acquaintance of Alexander Boswell, Lord Auchinleck, father of James Boswell.

He died at Chapel of Garioch on 2 July 1770. He is buried in the churchyard of St Machar's Cathedral.

== Family ==
Around 1718 he was married to Joanna Leslie (d. 1761). Their children included:

- Agnes Lumsden (1719–1807)
- Jane Lumsden (1725–1758)
- Theresa Lumsden (1730–1819)
- Charles Lumsden (b. 1734) died in infancy
- Alexander Lumsden MD (d. 1778) (Alexander Lumsden MD of Aberdeen is my ancestor, he died in Grenada in 1838. Alexander Lumsden Esq, also of Aberdeen, died in 1778 or 73, and another Alexander Lumsden (not an MD) died around that same time according to some records. These records are often confused. I'm not sure which of them this family is correct for though. I will update it if I can figure it out)

== Students ==
In his career at King's College he taught many people critical to Scotland's church history:

- Alexander Gerard (graduated 1744)
- Duncan Shaw (graduated 1747)
- James Sherriffs (graduated 1770)
