= Alexander Blackwell =

Scottish adventurer (c.1700–1747)

Alexander Blackwell (c.1700–1747) was a Scottish adventurer.

He was born in Aberdeen, the son of Rev Dr Thomas Blackwell principal of Marischal College in Aberdeen, and his wife Christian Johnston of Glasgow. His elder brother was Rev Thomas Blackwell.

He studied medicine, took to printing, and was thrown into prison for debt. His wife Elizabeth Blackwell supported him by writing and publishing a herbal (A Curious Herbal, published between 1737 and 1739). After his release, he went to Sweden (without his loyal wife) in 1742, was patronised by the king, convicted of conspiracy, and beheaded in 1747.
