= Tristão de Alencar Araripe =

Brazilian judge and government minister

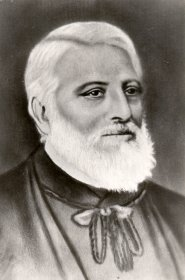

Minister of Finance of Brazil
- In office 1891

Personal details
- Born: 7 October 1821 Ceará, Brazil
- Died: 3 July 1908 (aged 86) Rio de Janeiro, Brazil
- Children: Araripe Júnior
- Relatives: Bárbara de Alencar (grandmother)

Tristão de Alencar, later Araripe (7 October 1821 – 3 July 1908), was a Brazilian judge and government minister. He was the grandson of Bárbara de Alencar, an important revolutionary leader during the revolutionary movements of 1817. He served as Minister of Finance in 1891.

One of his sons was the writer Araripe Júnior (1848-1911).
