= Araripe Júnior =

Brazilian writer, literary critic, and lawyer

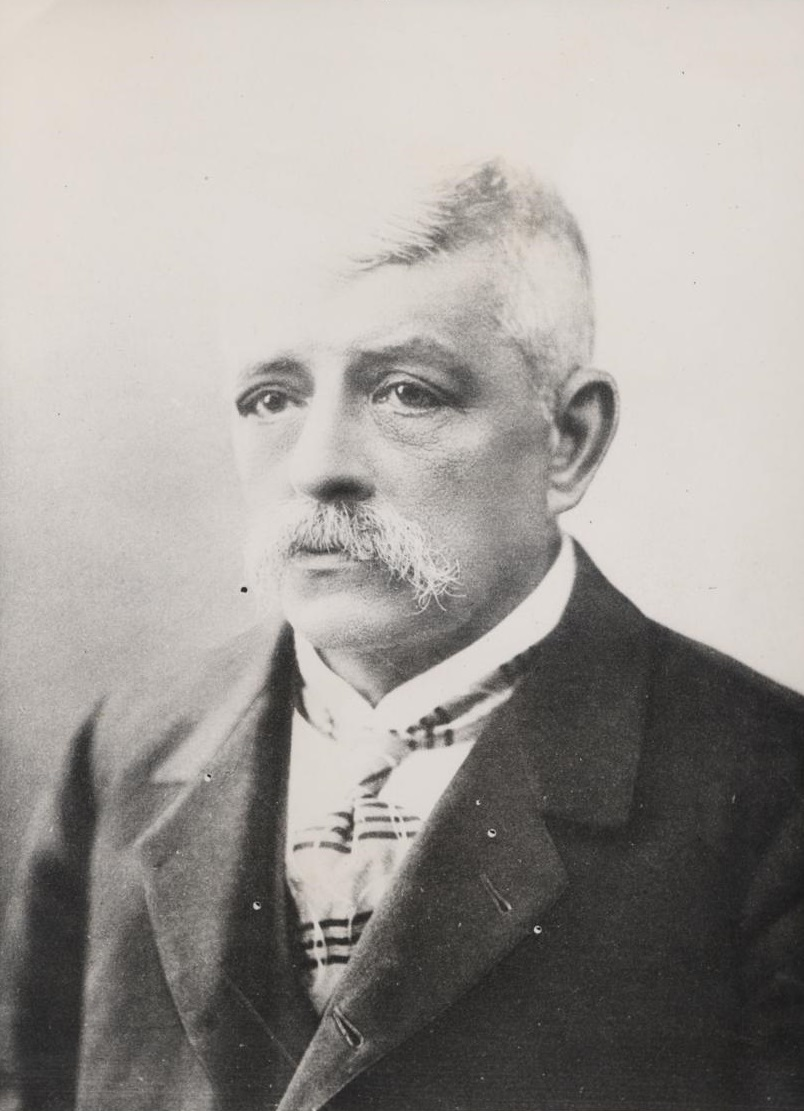
- Araripe Júnior
- Born: 27 June 1848; Fortaleza, Ceará, Brazil
- Died: 29 October 1911 (aged 63)
- Education: Faculdade de Direito do Recife
- Father: Tristão de Alencar Araripe
- Relatives: José de Alencar (cousin)

Tristão de Alencar Araripe Júnior (27 June 1848 – 29 October 1911) was a Brazilian lawyer, literary critic, and writer.

== Biography ==
Tristão de Alencar Araripe Júnior was born in Fortaleza, Ceará, the son of Tristão de Alencar Araripe and Argentina de Alencar Lima, into one of the country's most prominent families. In 1869, he graduated with the degree of Bachelor of Laws from Faculdade de Direito do Recife. Two years later he entered politics. Araripe Júnior was a founding member of the Brazilian Academy of Letters and the Instituto do Ceará. He was also a member of the Brazilian Historic and Geographic Institute.

== Works ==
Fiction

- Contos Brasileiros (short stories, 1868).
- A Casinha de Sapé (novel, 1872).
- O Ninho de Beija-flor (novel, 1874).
- Jacina, a Marabá (novel, 1875).
- Luizinha (novel, 1878).
- O Reino Encantado (novel, 1878).
- O Retirante (novel, 1878).
- Os Guaianás (novel, 1882).
- Quilombo dos Palmares (1882).
- Xico Melindroso (1882).
- Miss Kate (novel, 1909).
- O Cajueiro do Fagundes (novel, 1911).

Non-fiction

- Cartas sobre a Literatura Brasílica (1869).
- O Papado (1874).
- Anchieta (1879).
- José de Alencar: Perfil Literário (1882).
- Dirceu (1890).
- Função Normal do Terror nas Sociedades Cultas (1891).
- Gregório de Matos (1893).
- Deteriora Sequor (1894).
- Movimento Literário de 1893 (1896).
- Crepúsculo dos Povos (1896).
- Diálogo das Novas Grandezas do Brasil (1909).
- Pareceres (1911–1913).
- Ibsen e o Espírito da Tragédia (1911).
- Obra Crítica de Araripe Júnior, ed. Afrânio Coutinho (5 vols., 1958–1966).

== Notes ==
Preceded by Gregório de Matos (patron)	Brazilian Academy of Letters – Occupant of the 16th chair 1897–1911	Succeeded by Félix Pacheco
