= James Sherriffs =

Scottish minister (1752–1830)

James Sherriffs or Shirreffs (1752–1830) was a Scottish minister who served as Moderator of the General Assembly of the Church of Scotland in 1807.

== Life ==
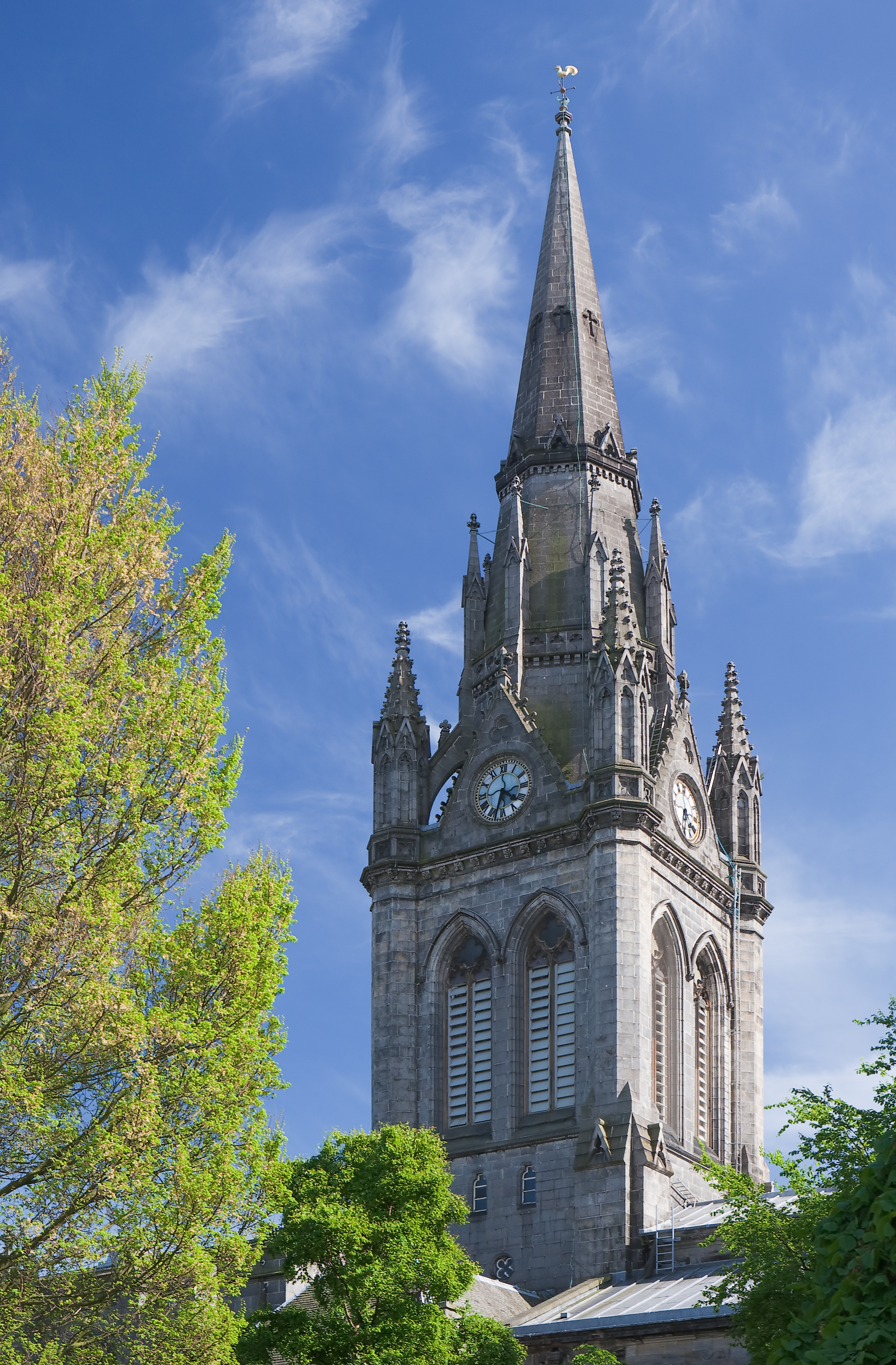
St Nicholas Kirk, Aberdeen

He was born in Aberdeen in 1752 the son of David Sherriffs a builder, and his wife Jane Lunan. His brother Andrew Sheriffs was a poet.

He was educated locally then studied at Aberdeen University graduating MA in 1770.

He was initially a schoolmaster at Aberdeen Grammar School. In 1776 he was licensed to preach by the Church of Scotland and in 1779 received patronage and was ordained as minister of the Kirk of St Nicholas in Aberdeen. In 1795 the university awarded him an honorary doctorate (DD) and in the same year he was appointed 11th Patron to the Seven Incorporated Trades of Aberdeen. In May 1807 he was elected Moderator of the General Assembly, the highest position in the Church of Scotland and was thereafter titled the Very Rev Dr Sheriffs.

He lived his final years at “Friendville” in Aberdeen. He died on 28 March 1830.

== Family ==
On 28 September 1790 he married Amelia Morison daughter of James Morison of Elsick, Lord Provost of Aberdeen. They had several children:

- David Sheriffs (1791–1809)
- James Sheriffs (1793–1813)
- Alexander Sheriffs (1794–1813)
- Amelia (b.1796) married Robert Burnett WS
- Jane (b.1796) married Alexander Cadenhead advocate

== Publications ==
- An Inquiry into the Life of Dr William Guild (1798)
