= James Fordyce =

Scottish Presbyterian minister and poet (1720-1796)

Reverend James Fordyce DD (Doctor of Divinity)
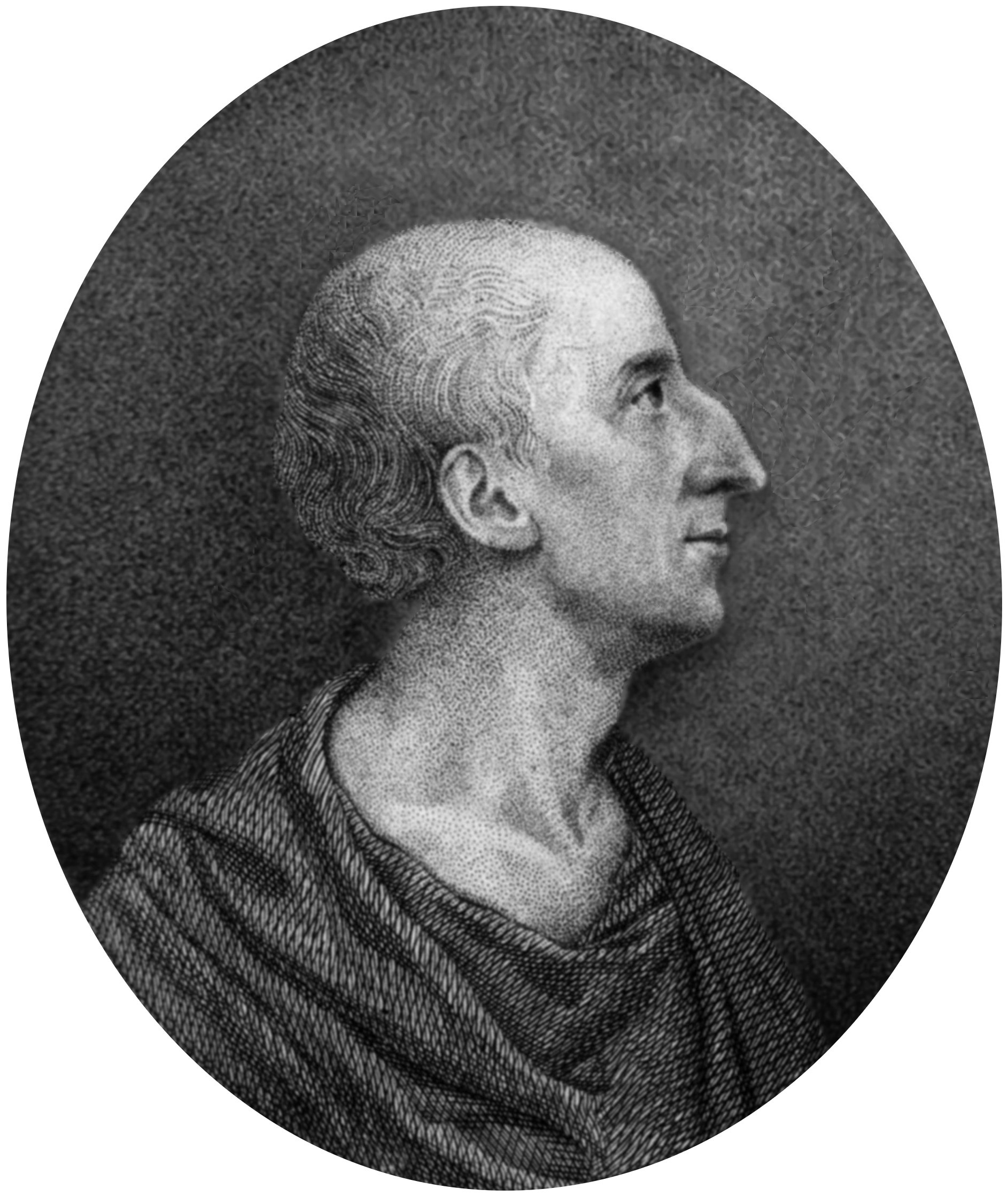

Personal life
- Born: 1720 Aberdeen, Scotland
- Died: 1 October 1796 (aged 75–76) Bath, Somerset, England
- Spouse: Henrietta Cumming (married in 1771, no children)
- Education: Marischal College; University of Glasgow
- Known for: Sermons to Young Women (1776); Moral and religious writtings
- Other names: Rev. James Fordyce, DD
- Relatives: David Fordyce (brother); Alexander Fordyce (brother); Sir William Fordyce (brother); George Fordyce (nephew)

Religious life
- Religion: Christianity (Presbyterian)
- Denomination: Church of Scotland; Presbyterian
- Church: Monkwell Street Presbyterian Church, London
- Profession: Minister; Poet; Author

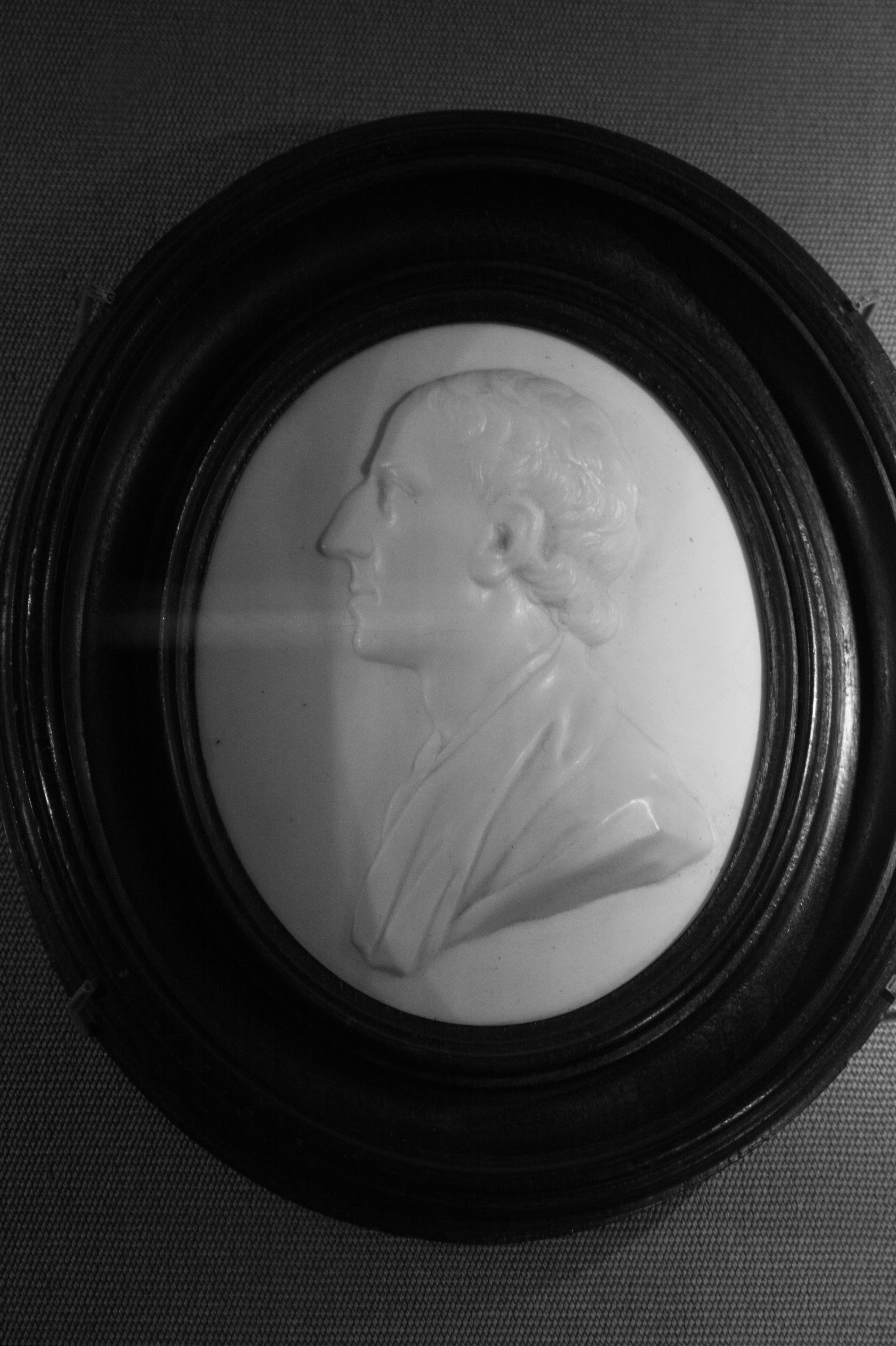
Cameo of Rev James Fordyce

James Fordyce, DD (1720–1 October 1796), was a Scottish Presbyterian minister and poet. He is best known for his collection of sermons published in 1766 as Sermons for Young Women, popularly known as Fordyce's Sermons.

== Early life ==
The third son of George Fordyce (1663–1733) of Broadford, merchant and Provost of Aberdeen (who had twenty children), James Fordyce was born at Aberdeen in the last quarter of 1720. David Fordyce was his elder brother, Alexander Fordyce and Sir William Fordyce were his younger brothers, and George Fordyce, M.D., was his nephew. After the Aberdeen High School Fordyce went to Marischal College, where he was educated for the ministry. On 23 February 1743 he was licensed by the Aberdeen presbytery.

In September 1744 he was presented by the Crown to the second charge at Brechin, Forfarshire. His admission was delayed, when the parishioners stood out for their right of election; he was ordained at Brechin on 28 August 1745. His position was not comfortable, and he did not get on with his colleague. In 1753 he took his degree of M.A. at Marischal College, and in the same year he received a presentation to Alloa, Clackmannanshire. The parishioners wanted another man; however, Fordyce got a call on 5 June, demitted his charge at Brechin on 29 August, and was admitted at Alloa on 12 October 1753. Here he was on better terms with his congregation, and acquired a reputation as a preacher. He published several sermons; in 1760 his sermon before the General Assembly on the 'folly, infamy, and misery of unlawful pleasures' created an impression. The University of Glasgow made him a Doctor of Divinity.

== Preacher in London ==
With several members of his family established in London, in 1760 he was chosen as colleague to Samuel Lawrence, D.D., minister of the presbyterian congregation in Monkwell Street. He demitted his charge at Alloa on 30 May, and was released from it on 18 June 1760. Lawrence died on 1 October, and Fordyce became sole pastor. He preached only on Sunday afternoons, the morning lecturer being Thomas Toller, Lawrence's son-in-law.

Fordyce's delivery and gestures were studied, and he drew crowds to Monkwell Street. His topics were didactic, but he also satisfied cultured tastes, and dealt with the ethics of actual life. David Garrick was impressed; Fordyce associated with Samuel Johnson, and introduced him to Hugh Blair. He gave sympathetic account in Addresses to the Deity, 1785, of Johnson's religious character, speaking as an evangelical moderate.

Fordyce's popularity lasted for about twelve years. Several causes contributed to its decline. In 1772 the banking failure of his brother Alexander involved the ruin of some adherents, and the loss of many friends. In 1775 the congregation was split by a quarrel between Fordyce and Toller, and Fordyce had Toller dismissed on 28 February 1775. A large part of the congregation moved with Toller to an independent meeting-house in Silver Street.

== Later life ==
With a diminished congregation, and under medical advice, Fordyce resigned his office at Christmas 1782. His charge at the ordination of his successor, James Lindsay, D.D., on 21 May 1783, was highly regarded. He retired to a country residence near Christchurch, Hampshire, where he was a neighbour of Lord Bute, who gave him the use of his library.

On the death (1792) of his brother, Sir William Fordyce, he removed to Bath, Somerset. He was troubled with asthma, and died suddenly of syncope on 1 October 1796 in his seventy-sixth year. He was buried in one of the parish churches of Bath; a funeral sermon was preached by Lindsay at Monkwell Street on 16 October. He married in 1771, the governess Henrietta Cumming, who died in Bath on 10 January 1823, aged 89. There was no issue of the marriage. One of his nieces was Elizabeth Isabelle Spence.

== Works ==
He published:

- 'The Eloquence of the Pulpit,' &c., 1752, (ordination sermon; often reprinted with David Fordyce's ' Theodorus').
- 'The Temple of Virtue,' &c., 1757, (by David Fordyce; but this edition has additional matter by James Fordyce).
- 'The Folly ... of Unlawful Pleasures,' &c., 1760; 2nd edit. Edinb. 1768.
- 'Sermons to Young Women,' 1765, 2 vols., often reprinted.
- 'The Character and Conduct of the Female Sex,' 1776.
- 'Addresses to Young Men,' 1777, 2 vols.
- 'Addresses to the Deity,' 1785.
- 'Poems,' 1786.
- 'A Discourse on Pain,' 1791, (Chalmers refers to a certain 'cure for the cramp' here given, and connects it with a passage from Beaumont and Fletcher).

Also a sermon on popery (1754), reprinted 1779; ordination sermon and charge (1755); sermon on Eccles. xi. 1 (1757); funeral sermon for Samuel Lawrence (1760); sermon on Prov. viii. 6, 7 (1775); charge at ordination of James Lindsay (1783). His book Sermons for Young Women was also published in an American edition (First Boston Edition) in 1796, by Thomas Hill, printers.
