= Marta McDowell =

Marta McDowell is an American author.

She worked as a horticulturist for five years at the Reeves-Reed Arboretum.

She is on the Board of the New Jersey Historical Garden Foundation at the Cross Estate.

== Books ==
- Unearthing The Secret Garden: The Plants and Places That Inspired Frances Hodgson Burnett (Timber Press, 2021)
- Emily Dickinson's Gardening Life: The Plants and Places That Inspired the Iconic Poet (Timber Press, 2019)
- The World of Laura Ingalls Wilder: The Frontier Landscapes that Inspired the Little House Books (Timber Press, 2017)
- All the Presidents' Gardens: Madison's Cabbages to Kennedy's Roses—How the White House Grounds Have Grown with America (Timber Press, 2016)
- A Curious Herbal: Elizabeth Blackwell's pioneering masterpiece of botanical art (editor) (Abbeville Press, 2023)
- Gardening Can Be Murder (Timber Press, 2023)
