= Alexander Fordyce =

Scottish banker (1729–1789)

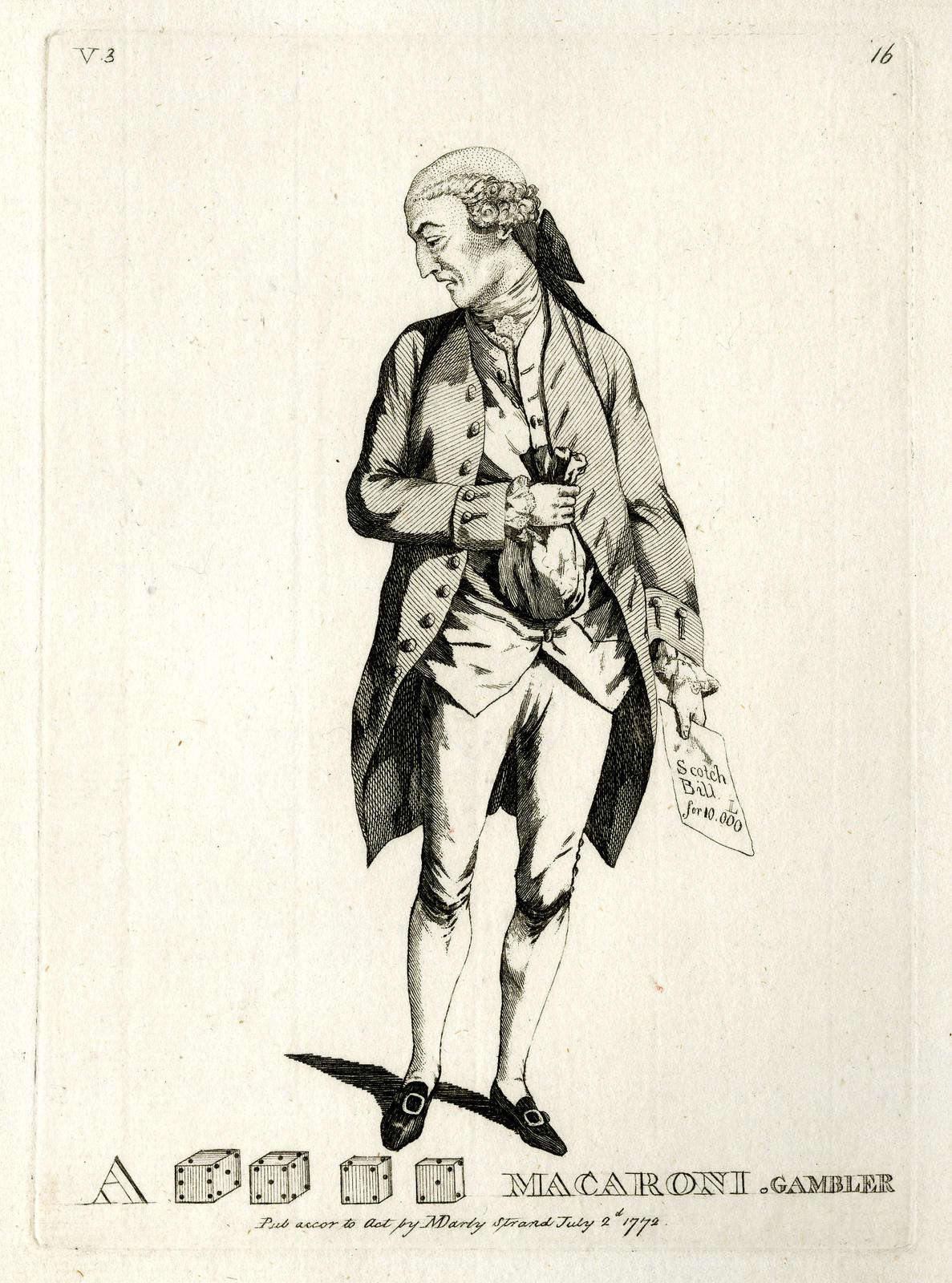
Print of Alexander Fordyce, dressed as the Macaroni Gambler with puns on Fordyce's last name (Four-Dice).

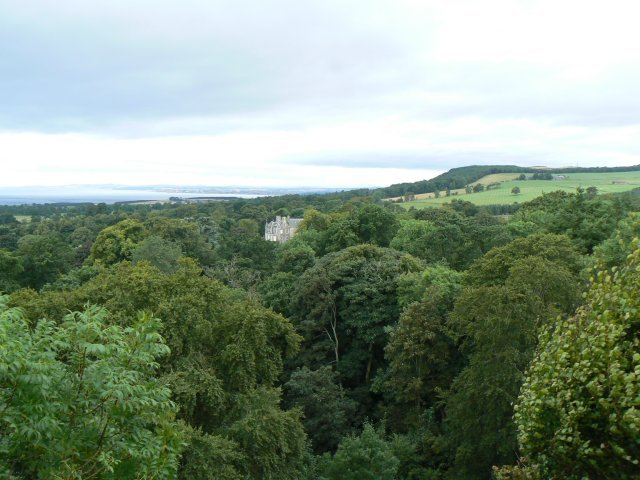
Balcarres mansion in the trees – geograph.org.uk – 1465362

Alexander Fordyce (7 August 1729 – 8 September 1789) was a Scottish banker, centrally involved in the bank run on Neale, James, Fordyce and Down which led to the credit crisis of 1772. He fled abroad and was declared bankrupt, but in time he used the profits from other investments to cover the losses.

== Early life ==
Alexander was baptized in Belhelvie as the youngest son of George Fordyce of Broadford (1663–Eggie, 1733), six times Provost of Aberdeen who was married twice, had many children but only a few survived. He was (half)-brother to David, Agnes, James, and William Fordyce. In 1746 he travelled in the Scottish Highlands. He was educated by his uncle Thomas Blackwell, principle and lecturing common law at Marischal College and who became his brother-in-law in 1751. For some time he was in the hosiery trade at Aberdeen. In 1757, he left and found a situation as outdoor clerk to a banker named Boldero & Co at Lombard Street, London. In 1759 his brother James arrived in London and became minister of the presbyterian congregation.

In 1768 he stood as a radical candidate for the borough of Colchester at the general election, but four people announced their endorsement in a newspaper. The esquire spent nearly £14,000; but was defeated by 43 votes by Charles Gray. The interloper had spent money to build a chapel, a hospital and otherwise cultivate the borough. In June 1770, at the age of 42, he married Lady Margaret Lindsay, a 17-years-old daughter of James Lindsay at Balcarres House (Fife). He was appointed rector of the Marischal College, Aberdeen in the same year. Then Fordyce's gold watch was stolen somewhere on the highway; the robbers were executed early 1771.

== Banker and speculator ==
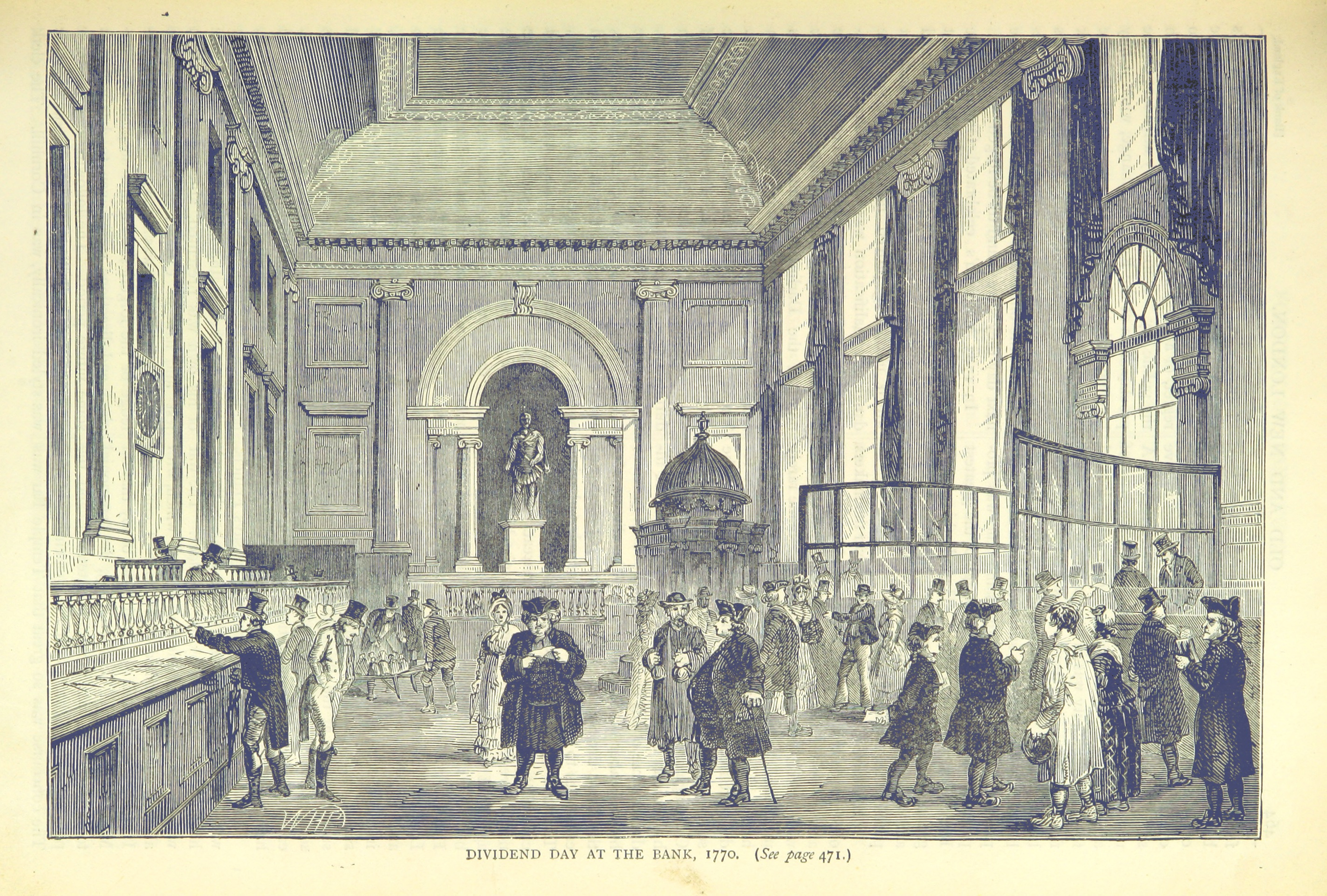
Dividend Day at the Bank of England, 1770

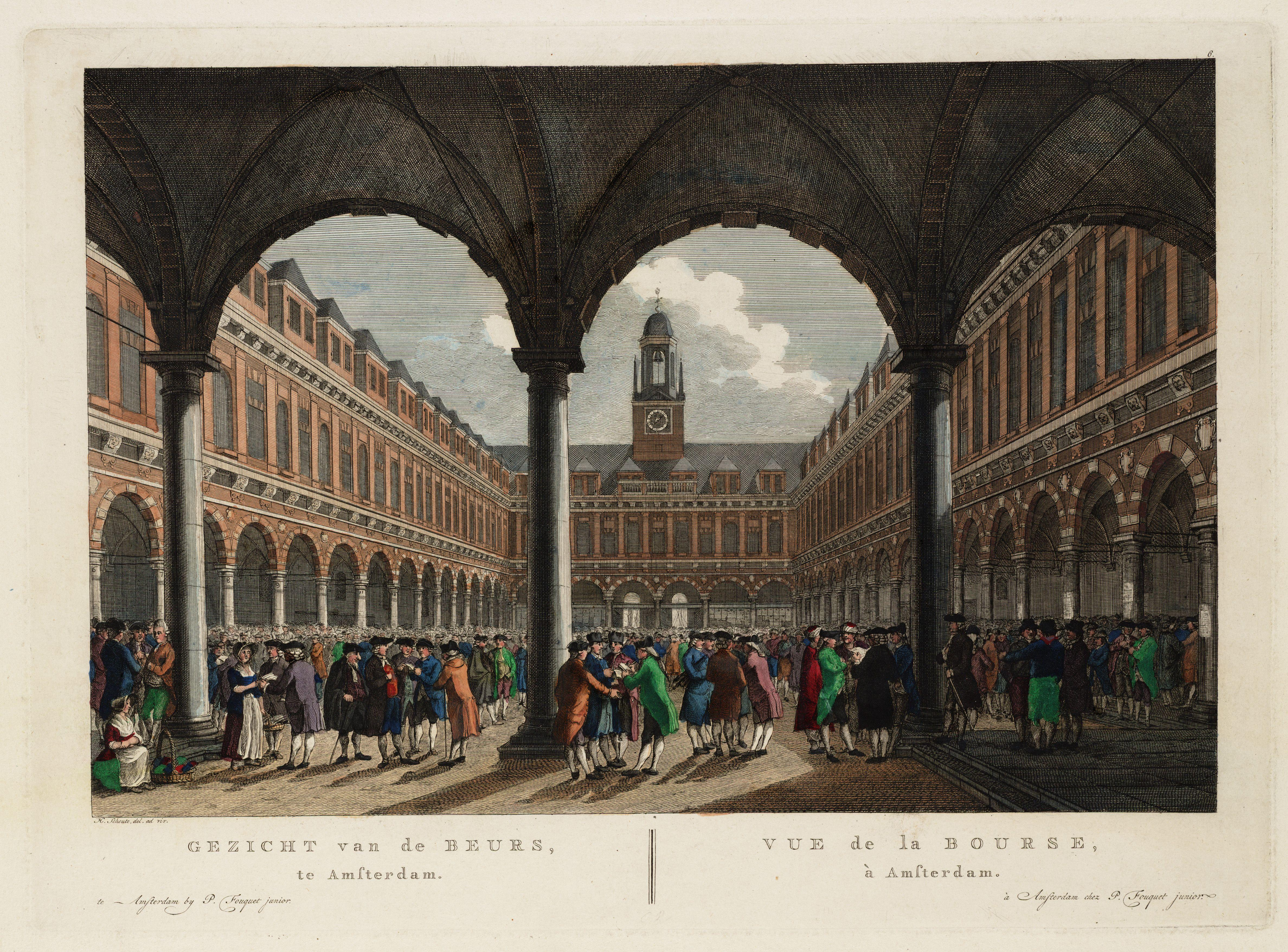
The Amsterdam Stock Exchange by P. Fouquet (1729–1800)

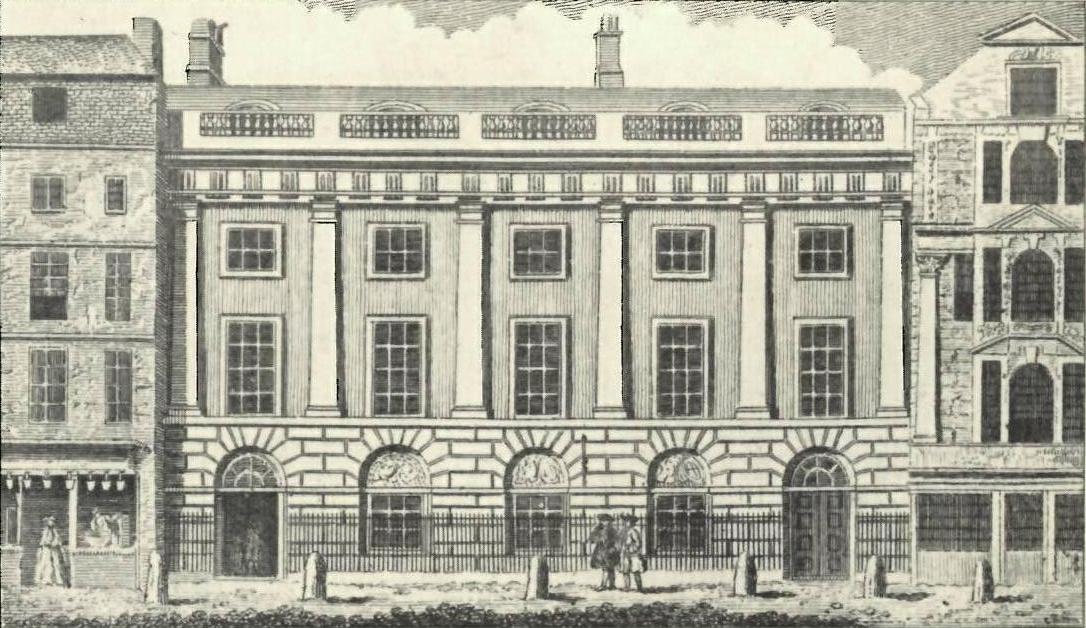
Engraving of East India House, Leadenhall Street (1766)

From 1757 he was a partner in the banking house Neale, James, Fordyce and Down on Threadneedle Street in London. Under his guidance the firm speculated freely, and gained by obtaining early intelligence of the signature of the preliminaries of the Peace of Paris in 1763. In 1764 Fordyce cooperated with Hope & Co. bankers in Amsterdam. East India Company stock rose greatly in 1764–65. With the proceeds of these and other speculations in Change Alley Fordyce purchased an estate near Wimbledon now Grove House, Roehampton, where he lived magnificently. He entered a series of fêtes, banquets and entertainment, which threw those of the royalty in the shade.

In July 1770 Fordyce collaborated with two planters John and William Macintosh on Grenada and borrowed 240,000 guilders in bearer bonds from Hope & Co. Also Sir William Pulteney, Samuel Hannay, Samuel Hoare (1716–1796) and John Harman were involved. Hope had undertaken commissions for Fordyce on the Amsterdam stock exchange involving dealings for the account in shares of the British East India Company. Fordyce had been speculating successfully and managed to deceive his partners for a while; according to one biographer, "It is said he succeeded in quieting their fears by the simple expedient of showing them a pile of bank notes which he had borrowed for the purpose for a few hours." The tide of fortune then turned; he lost heavily at the beginning of 1771 in the fluctuations of the market caused by the dispute with Spain about the Falkland Islands. In 1771/1772 Fordyce bet heavily against EIC share price, which went awfully awry. In May 1772 the EIC stock price rose significantly.

== Financial crash and aftermath ==
Portman square

On Monday 8 June 1772, it became clear Fordyce failed. The next day he disappeared to avoid debt repayment. His bank stopped payment on 10 June; meanwhile Fordyce absconded to France. Fordyce lost £300,000 shorting East India Company stock, leaving his partners liable for an estimated £243,000 in debts. He had speculated away the bank's assets and lost the backing of the Bank of England. On 13 June – in an advertisement – he was required to surrender himself and to make a full discovery of his estates and effects.

On 12 June the news of the failure of Neale, James, Fordyce and Down reached Scotland. After the weekend a bank run began on its Edinburgh branch. As this information became public within two weeks eight banks in London collapsed. According to Paul Kosmetatos "lurid tales abounded in the press for a time of merchants cutting their throats, shooting or hanging themselves". On 24 June 1772 his goods, stocks and country house were seized by The Crown; the whole City of London was in uproar when Fordyce was declared bankrupt. Neale, James, Fordyce and Down, the largest buyer of Scottish bills of exchange, were forced to declare insolvency. Also the Ayr Bank collapsed on 24 June. The stoppage precipitated a crisis. Sir Richard Glyn and Sir Thomas Hallifax stopped payment temporarily, and a stoppage by Sir George Colebrooke came close. On 25 July Fordyce was given seven weeks to appear for his creditors and come to an agreement. Around 20 banks across Scotland and the Dutch Republic collapsed in the aftermath.

On request he was extradited by France and sailed from Boulogne-sur-Mer to Rye, East Sussex in September. He went through an examination at the Guildhall and declared personal bankruptcy. His debt was about £100,000. In December he agreed a repay scheme with his creditors. His sister-in-law published the ballad Auld Robin Gray. In 1774 he was forced to sell his estate to Sir Joshua Vanneck, 1st Baronet; the plaintiffs were Hope & Co and Hoare. A sermon by Thomas Toller, minister sharing a church with James Fordyce, published in London in 1775, describes Fordyce's fall. Fordyce was again the defeated candidate at Colchester in 1780. He died after a long illness on 8 September 1789, at Mr. Mead's in George Street, near Portman Square. His widow married in 1812 Sir James Bland Burges.

Academic offices
Preceded by John Gray	Rector of Marischal College, Aberdeen; 1770–?	Succeeded by No record

== Notes ==
This article incorporates text from a publication now in the public domain: Cannan, Edwin (1889). "Fordyce, Alexander". Dictionary of National Biography. Vol. 19. pp. 431–432.
