= Sermons to Young Women =

1766 book by James Fordyce

Sermons to Young Women (1766), often called Fordyce's Sermons, is a two-volume compendium of sermons compiled by James Fordyce, a Scottish Presbyterian clergyman, which were originally delivered by himself and others. They were intended for a primarily female audience.

Fordyce was considered an excellent orator, and his collection of sermons found a ready audience among English clergy and laity alike. It quickly became a staple of many Church and personal libraries.

== References in other works ==
In her work A Vindication of the Rights of Woman, published in 1792, Mary Wollstonecraft wrote that she must address Fordyce's Sermons, though they do not deserve such notice, because they had been given as reading material to so many young people. Quoting passages from the sermons, Wollstonecraft noted "condescending endearment" and "sexual compliments" as that which Fordyce, and others, treated women with. She said that women will not be independent as long as such insincere praises, rather than truth and sobriety, are what they are treated to. She called Fordyce's prescribed female behavior in response to a neglectful and indifferent husband "the portrait of a house slave."

In the novel Pride and Prejudice (1813) by Jane Austen, Mr Collins, a clergyman, attempts to read the book aloud to the women during a visit to the Bennet household. The youngest of the five Bennet daughters, Lydia, interrupts him "before [...] three pages" leading him to stop reading, with the comment, "how little young ladies are interested by books of a serious stamp, though written solely for their benefit. It amazes me, I confess;—for certainly, there can be nothing so advantageous to them as instruction."

Additionally in the 1775 play The Rivals, by Richard Brinsley Sheridan, Fordyce's sermon on Sobriety is mentioned.
