= Seven Incorporated Trades of Aberdeen =

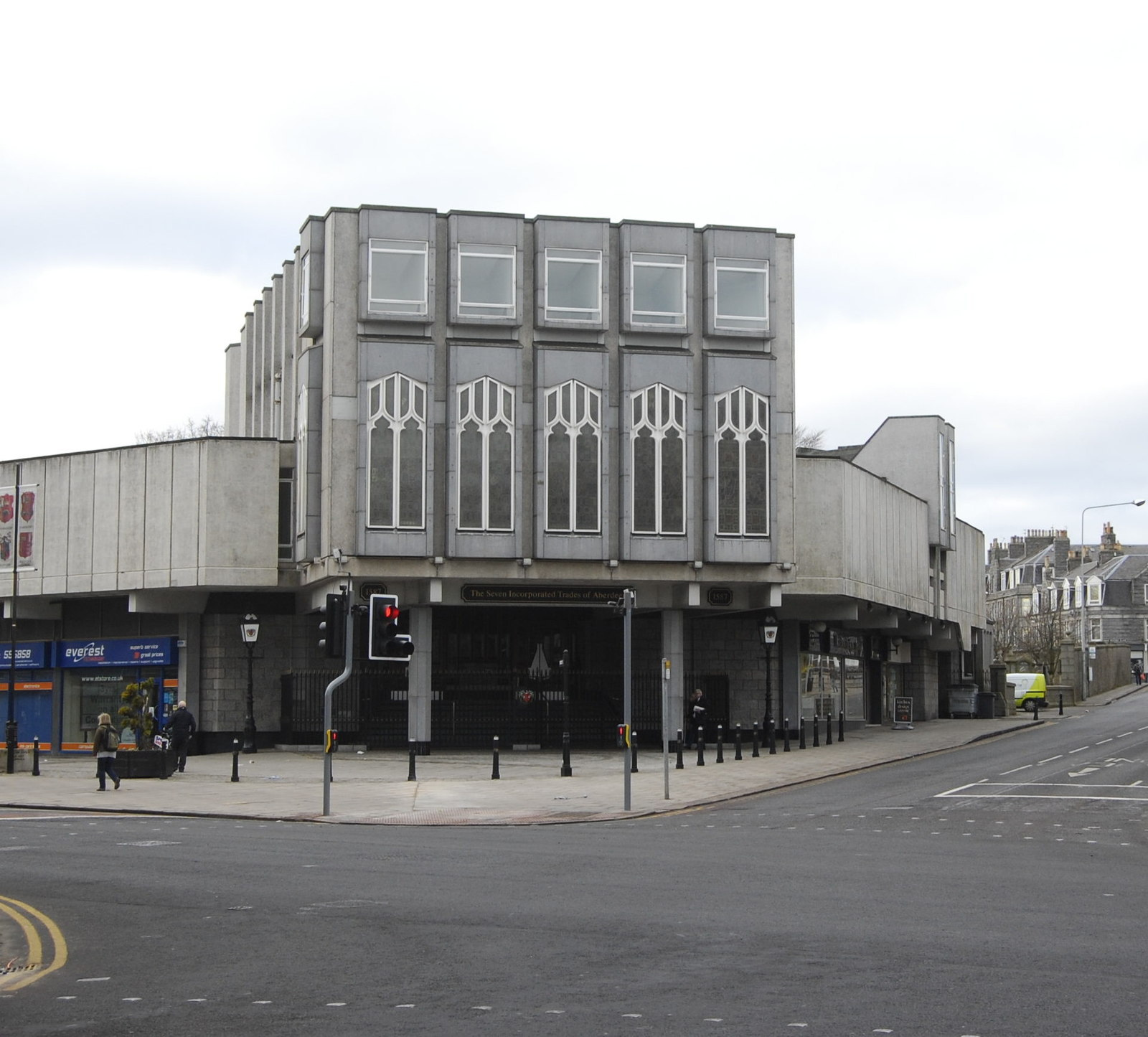
Current base for the society.

Seven Incorporated Trades of Aberdeen is an ancient society of craftsmen in Aberdeen, Scotland. Their home is Trinity Hall on the city's Holburn Street.

== Composition ==
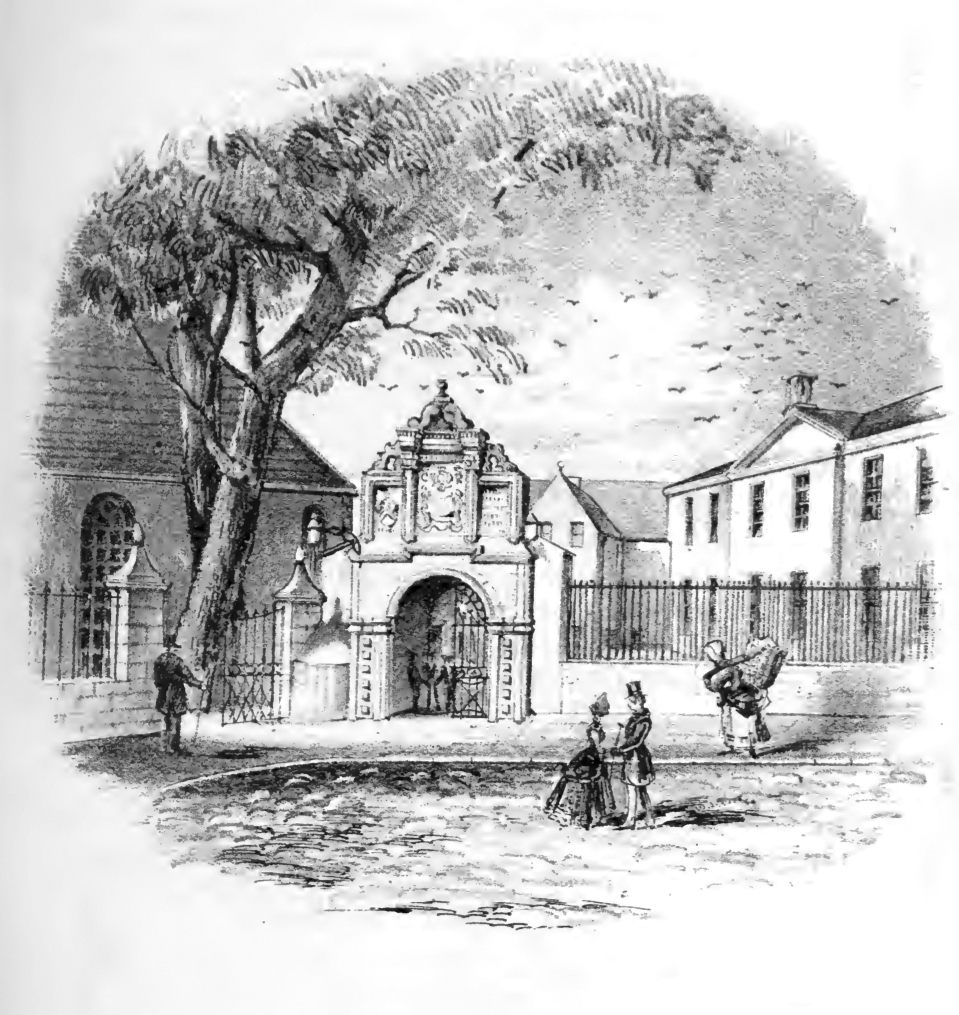
Old Trades Hall, Aberdeen

The society comprises seven trades:

- Hammermen (1519)
- Bakers (1398)
- Wrights and Coopers (1527)
- Tailors (1511)
- Shoemakers (1484 and 1520)
- Weavers (pre 1222)
- Fleshers (1534)

== History ==
The first Deacon Convenor of the joint seven trades was George Elphinstone, a saddler in the Guild of Hammermen, appointed in June 1587. In an effort to alleviate disputes between the various trades this body was created and created what was known as the Aberdeen Magna Carta, a charter drawn up to agree processes and settlement of disputes ratified in August 1587 and raised to the status of a Royal Charter by King James VI on 16 July 1617.

== Notable Patrons ==
- Dr William Guild 1632 to 1657
- Rev Dr Thomas Blackwell 1716 to 1728
- Very Rev James Sherriffs 1785 to 1814
- Rev Dr William Laurence Brown 1824 to 1828
- Very Rev J Mitford Mitchell 1890 to 1895
- Sir George Adam Smith 1924 to 1938
- Very Rev Alan Main 2000 to 2013
