= Thomas Blackwell (scholar) =

Scottish academic (1701-1757)

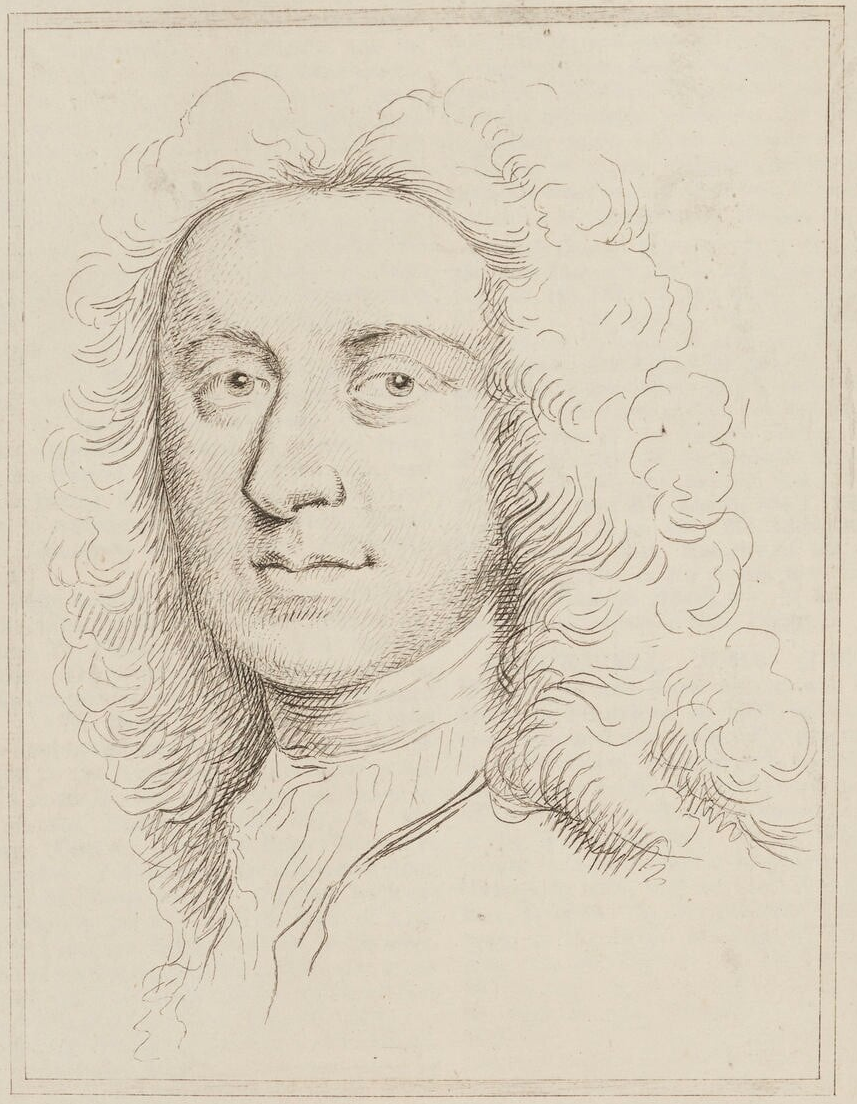
- Etching after a 1735 drawing of Blackwell
- Born: 4 August 1701; Aberdeen
- Died: 6 March 1757 (aged 55); Edinburgh
- Education: Marischal College, University of Aberdeen
- Spouse: Barbara Black (m. 1751)
- Father: Thomas Blackwell
- Relatives: Christian Johnston (mother), Alexander Blackwell (brother)
- Scientific career
- Workplaces: Marischal College

Thomas Blackwell the younger (4 August 1701 – 6 March 1757) was a classical scholar, historian and "one of the major figures in the Scottish Enlightenment."

== Life ==
He was born on 4 August 1701 in the city of Aberdeen, son of Rev Dr Thomas Blackwell (1660–1728), ministers of the Kirk of St Nicholas in Aberdeen and later Principal of Marischal College and his wife Christian Johnston (d.1749). His father was Patron of the Seven Incorporated Trades of Aberdeen from 1714 to 1728.

He attended the Grammar School of his native place and studied Greek and philosophy at Marischal College, graduating M.A. in 1718. He was presented to the chair of Greek at Marischal in 1723, becoming the college's principal on 7 October 1748. Blackwell was a well regarded professor and taught a number of important Enlightenment figures including Principal George Campbell, Robert Chambers, Alexander Gerard, and James Beattie, He strongly influenced James Macpherson, the godfather as it were of Ossian, Lord Monboddo and Adam Ferguson.

In May 1751, he married Barbara Black, third daughter of James Black, Dean of Guild of Aberdeen, and his wife Agnes Fordyce, daughter of Provost George Fordyce. They had no children but they educated Alexander Fordyce, her brother. Thomas Blackwell died of a consumptive illness in Edinburgh on 6 March 1757. His remains were buried in Greyfriars Churchyard.

== Major works ==
Blackwell's works, including An Enquiry into the Life and Writings of Homer (1735), Letters Concerning Mythology (1748), and Memoirs of the Court of Augustus (3 vols., 1753–63), established him as one of the premier figures in the Scottish Enlightenment.

=== Enquiry ===
In the Enquiry Blackwell considered why Homer was supreme as an epic poet and concluded that this was owing almost entirely to natural forces. Homer was the outcome of a specific society and natural environment, which combined to shape the inherited culture and produce a setting highly favourable to epic poetry. Blackwell's idea that, instead of being innate as hitherto supposed, culture was learned and continually changing, was to become one of the basic assumptions of modern cultural anthropology.

Civilisation brought advances in material terms but also artificiality and corruption and a loss of the heroic vision of earlier periods. Homer bridged the transition between modernity and the old heroic ethos, and as a plebeian was heir to a rich popular culture which gave realism and vividness to his verses. Blackwell argued that Homer had been an oral poet whose songs had been edited into developed epic form long after his death.

Enquiry had a high reputation with Blackwell's contemporaries (Gibbon praised as "an effort of genius"; Herder called a "key" to Homer) and he his credited as having revived the study of Greek literature in the North of Scotland.

=== Letters Concerning Mythology ===
As the Letters Concerning Mythology were first published in 1748 there were nineteen letters in all, the first six by an anonymous hand. Blackwell was responsible for letters seven to nineteen. Their content was as bold and original as the book on Homer had been. Classical mythology had been discussed throughout the Christian era from a variety of unsympathetic standpoints: firstly by Euhemeristic critics who saw it as a fanciful form of history; next by Christian commentators who treated the classical gods as thinly-disguised demons; and finally by modern rationalists who saw the system as ultimately irrational and meaningless. Blackwell took a radically different view. He saw mythology as a deeply civilising influence, which, if its allegorical intention were interpreted sympathetically, was an important key to the world-view of classical antiquity.

Ordinary people may have accepted the stories of the gods at face value, but the intelligentsia had regarded 'the old Divinity' as conveying profound insights into the nature of reality but doing so in symbolic terms, and these Blackwell set himself to interpret, beginning in earnest with his Ninth Letter, of mythology as "Instruction conveyed in a Tale". He drew on a wide range of evidence from a variety of sources including not only the literary myths in Greek and Latin and the Orphic Hymns, but French, Spanish, Italian, Hebrew and Arabic texts, attempting to isolate the surviving original mythic strain from layers of later accretions.

Blackwell compared the early Jewish world view with contemporary Near Eastern cosmographies, analysing the account of creation in the Book of Genesis along with ancient Phoenician texts transmitted through Sanchuniathon to trace the transformation of Chaldean monotheism into polytheism as the stars began to be worshiped as lesser deities. Throughout this wide-ranging study Blackwell insisted that the past was not a foreign country but perfectly coherent and intelligible when viewed in its own terms.

=== Memoirs of the Court of Augustus (1753–63) ===
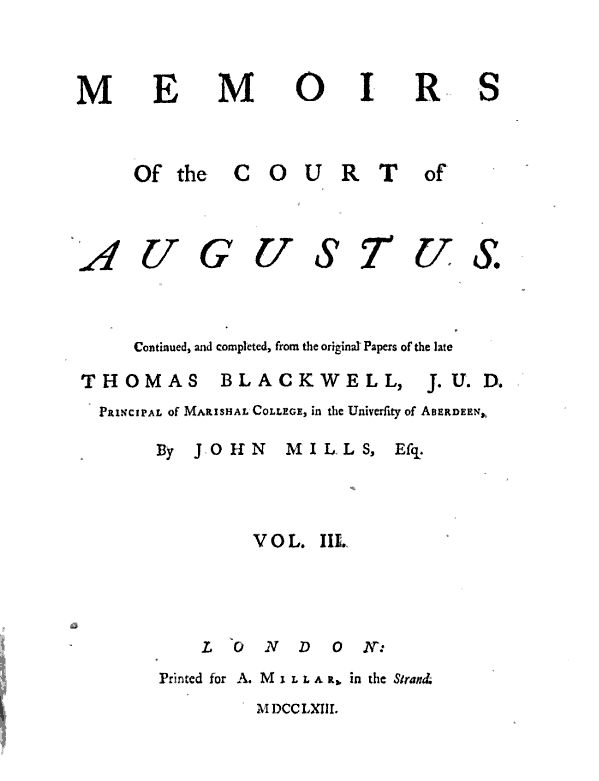
Memoirs of the Court of Augustus, Vol. 3, 1763

In Memoirs of the Court of Augustus (3 vols., 1753–63), Blackwell approached his subject as a practitioner of intellectual history, calling it 'This difficult Science of Men'. (p. 5) He showed how individuals were defined by society, and went on to trace the causes of Rome's developing from an obscure hamlet into a great imperial power. Rome's ethos had originally been austere and military and its original institutions democratic ones.

But insufficient separation of powers meant that if the republican impulse faltered there was little to prevent a slide into tyranny. A balanced constitution was therefore essential to enduring political success, a lesson reinforced by his comparative studies of later great powers including France, Venice and the Spanish Empire. Politics and empire formed only a part of this wide-ranging study. The ability of power to mould behaviour patterns fascinated Blackwell, and his study of Virgil and Horace demonstrated the responsiveness of the arts to their political context and explored how they might influence it in turn.

After Blackwell's death John Mills continued and completed the third volume of Memoirs of the Court of Augustus, which was published in 1763.

== Comparison with Hippolyte Taine ==
In a set of articles, published in 1897 by distinguished Brazilian scholar Tristão de Alencar Araripe Júnior, Blackwell was credited with being a precursor of Taine's ideas concerning the contextual study of works of art. "There was,... in the last century, a Scottish critic who innovatively applied to Homer the same processes of the master of modern criticism," Araripe Júnior wrote:

And what is more surprising, he did it before Montesquieu had put into circulation his theory on the influence of climate upon the laws and, therefore, upon all human social relations... This work [Enquiry] follows the same mental scheme used by Taine, except for the naturalistic technique. Blackwell does not speak of mesology; but, as the book goes on, we see that none of the factors identified by the French critic escaped his observation and analysis.

Blackwell's theory of the formative effects of climate on our character and culture impressed and influenced Johann Gottfried Herder, and it's known today how Taine drew on the German philosopher's ideas.

== Legacy ==
Blackwell's work enjoyed a high contemporary reputation, and for nearly half a century he was regarded as the foremost Homeric scholar in Europe. But his Scottish Whig politics attracted bitterly hostile criticism from conservatively minded English critics like Samuel Johnson, and his achievement was long cast into the shadow.

== See also ==
- Montesquieu
- Jean-Baptiste Dubos
- Johann Joachim Winckelmann

== Publications ==
- (1735). An Enquiry into the Life and Writings of Homer.
- (1746). The Dangers of the Rebellion, and our Happy Deliverance, Considered, and a Suitable Consequent Behaviour Recommended.
- (1747). Proofs of the Enquiry into the Life and Writings of Homer.
- (1748). Letters Concerning Mythology.
- (1753–55, 1763). Memoirs of the Court of Augustus.
- (1770). Letter to J. Ames, Archæologia, or, Miscellaneous Tracts Relating to Antiquity , Vol. I, p. 333.
