= Family in early modern Scotland =

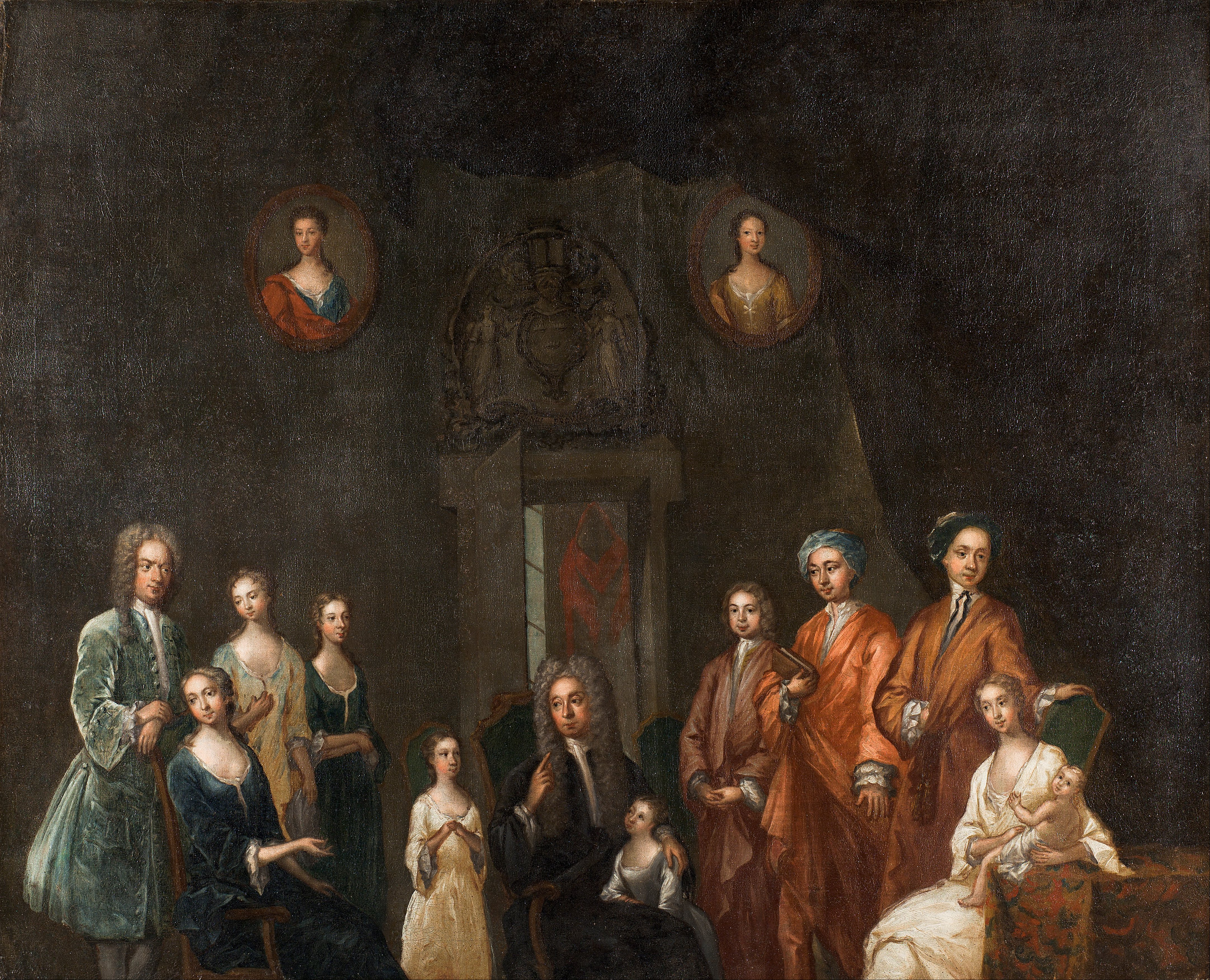
Portrait of Sir Francis Grant, Lord Cullen, and His Family, by John Smybert (1688–1751)

The family in early modern Scotland includes all aspects of kinship and family life, between the Renaissance and the Reformation of the sixteenth century and the beginnings of industrialisation and the end of the Jacobite risings in the mid-eighteenth century in Scotland.

Scottish kinship in this period was agnatic, with descent judged through a common ancestor, helping to create the surname system in the Borders and the clans in the Highlands, with these systems beginning to break down in the seventeenth and eighteenth centuries respectively. There was considerable concern over the safety of children. The abolition of godparents in the Reformation meant that baptism became a mechanism for emphasising the role and responsibilities of fathers. Wet-nurses were used for young children, but in most families mothers took the primary role in bringing up children, while the Kirk emphasised the role of the father for older children. After the Reformation there was an increasing emphasis on education, resulting in the growth of a parish school system, but its effects were limited for the children of the poor and for girls. Most children left home for a period of life-cycle service, as domestic or agricultural servants or as apprentices before marriage.

Marriages were often the subject of careful negotiations, particularly higher in society. Marriage lost its sacramental status at the Reformation and irregular marriage continued to be accepted as valid throughout the period. Women managed the household and might work beside their husbands and, although obedience to husbands was stressed, this may have been limited in practice. Divorce developed after the Reformation and was available for a wider range of causes and accessed by a much larger section of society than in England. Because of high mortality rates widowhood was a relatively common state, and some women acquired independence and status, but others were forced into a marginal existence and remarriage was common. The elaborate funerals and complex system of prayers for the dead that dominated in late Medieval Scotland were removed at the Reformation and simpler services adopted. Burial inside the church was discouraged. As a result separate aisles for the rich and graveyards with stone markers for the majority became common.

== Kinship ==
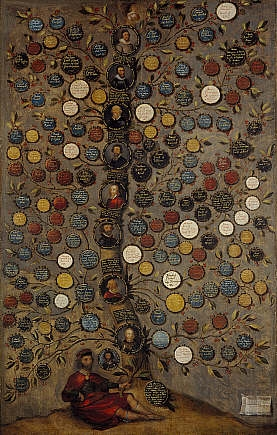
Painting by George Jamesone of The Campbell of Glenorchy Family Tree (1635)

Unlike in England, where kinship was predominately cognatic (derived through both males and females), in early modern Scotland kinship was agnatic (with members of a group sharing a, sometimes fictional, common ancestor through only the male line). Women retained the original surname of their family of origin at marriage and marriages were intended to create alliances between kin groups, rather than a new bond of kinship that joined two families together. In the Borders, on both the English and Scottish sides, there were extensive bonds of kinship, often reflected in a common surname. A shared surname has been seen as a "test of kinship", proving large bodies of kin who could call on each other’s support. At the beginning of the period this could help intensify the idea of the feud. Feuds were semi-formalised disputes, often motivated by revenge for past actions against a member of kin. In a surname system large bodies of kin could be counted on to support rival sides, resulting in long-term local warfare, although conflict between members of kin groups also occurred. From the reign of James VI (r. 1567–1625), systems of judicial law were enforced, aided by the Union of Crowns in 1603 that dissolved much of the political significance of the border. The leadership of the heads of the great surnames was largely replaced by the authority of landholding lairds in the seventeenth century and by the early eighteenth century the feud had been almost completely suppressed.

The combination of agnatic kinship and the feudal system, which formalised mutual obligations of service and protection, organised through heritable jurisdictions, has been seen as creating the Highland clan system. The head of a clan was usually the eldest son of the last chief of the most powerful sept or branch. The leading families of a clan formed the fine, often seen as equivalent to Lowland lairds, providing council in peace and leadership in war, and below them were the daoine usisle (in Gaelic) or tacksmen (in Scots), who managed the clan lands and collected the rents. Most of the followers of the clan were tenants, who supplied labour to the clan heads and could be called upon to act as soldiers when needed. In the early modern era they usually took the clan name as their surname, turning it into a massive, if often fictive, kin group. Economic change and the imposition of royal justice had begun to undermine the clan system before the eighteenth century, but the process was accelerated after the Jacobite rising of 1745. Highland dress was banned, clansmen were forcible disarmed, there was the compulsory purchase of heritable jurisdictions, many chiefs were exiled and ordinary clansmen were sent to the colonies as indentured labourers. Within a generation, these factors reduced most clan leaders to the status of simple landholders, without independent military power.

== Childhood ==
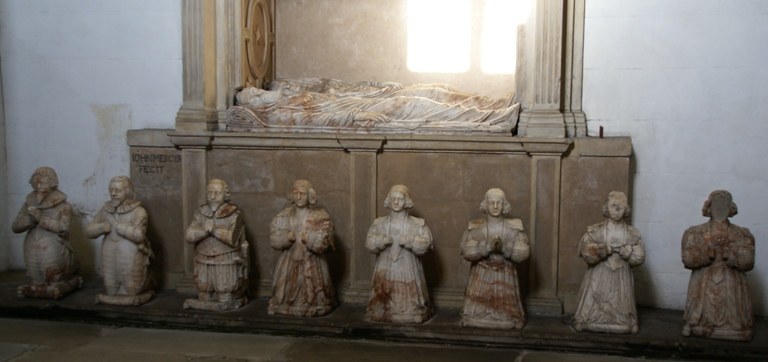
Sir George Bruce monument, Culross Abbey, showing his children praying below the tomb

There was considerable concern over the safety of mother and child in birth. Although childbirth was a predominantly female event, with neighbours and midwives in support, the father was often present in or near the birthing chamber to assert, or in the cases of birth outside marriage to admit, his paternity. Before the Reformation, baptism was a means of creating wider spiritual kinship with godparents, but in the reformed Kirk, godparents were abolished and the baptismal ceremony was used primarily as a means of strengthening the "natural" relationship of the child with the parents and to define their roles. This was particularly focused on the father, who would have the primary responsibility for the moral and spiritual education of the child. Among the elite of Highland society, there existed a system of fosterage that created similar links to godparenthood, with children being sent to the households of other major families to facilitate the creation of mutual bonds, that often endured into later life.

Following birth it was common, particularly among richer families, to employ a wet-nurse to care for the child, sometimes living in with the family. Few sources give an insight into the experiences of young children in this period. Some parents played with their children and parents demonstrated grief at their loss. The primary responsibility for bringing up young children fell on the mother. For older children, the major duty of parents was, according to the Kirk, to ensure the spiritual development of the child, with fathers leading daily family prayers, but it is not clear how widely these practices were adopted.

== Youth and education ==
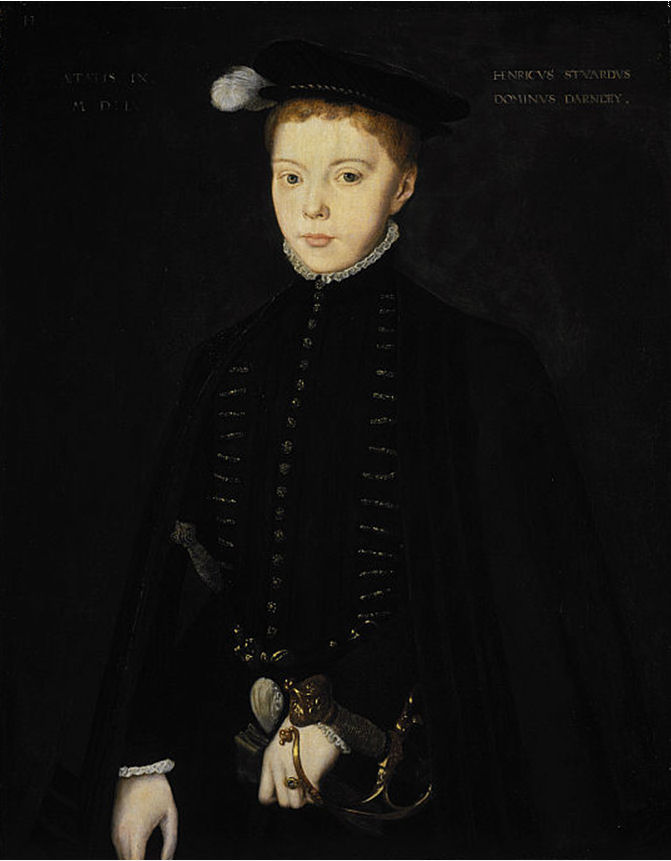
Henry Stuart, Lord Darnley, as a child (1555), by Hans Eworth

Historians debate whether early modern individuals experienced a period of youth in the modern sense. For many the early teens were marked by moving away from home to undertake life-cycle service, which was necessary so that they could build up skills and capital that would enable them to marry and create a separate household. Lower down in society boys might be apprenticed to a trade, or become agricultural servants. Girls might go into domestic or agricultural service. For those higher up in society and increasingly for those lower down, this might be after a period of schooling or even university.

The Humanist concern with widening education that had become significant in the Renaissance was shared by Protestant reformers. For boys, in the burghs the old schools were maintained, with the song schools and a number of new foundations becoming reformed grammar schools or ordinary parish schools. There were also large number of unregulated "adventure schools", which sometimes fulfilled a local needs and sometimes took pupils away from the official schools. At their best, the curriculum included catechism, Latin, French, Classical literature and sports. A series of acts attempted to establish schools in every parish from 1616. By the late seventeenth century there was a largely complete network of parish schools in the Lowlands, but in the Highlands basic education was still lacking in many areas.

The widespread belief in the limited intellectual and moral capacity of women, vied with a desire, intensified after the Reformation, for women to take personal moral responsibility, particularly as wives and mothers. In Protestantism this necessitated an ability to learn and understand the catechism and even to be able to independently read the Bible, but most commentators, even those that tended to encourage the education of girls, thought they should not receive the same academic education as boys. In the lower ranks of society, they benefited from the expansion of the parish schools system that took place after the Reformation, but were usually outnumbered by boys, often taught separately, for a shorter time and to a lower level. They were frequently taught reading, sewing and knitting, but not writing. Female illiteracy rates based on signatures among female servants were around 90 percent, from the late seventeenth to the early eighteenth centuries and perhaps 85 percent for women of all ranks by 1750, compared with 35 per cent for men. Among the nobility there were many educated and cultured women, of which Mary, Queen of Scots is the most obvious example.

== Marriage ==
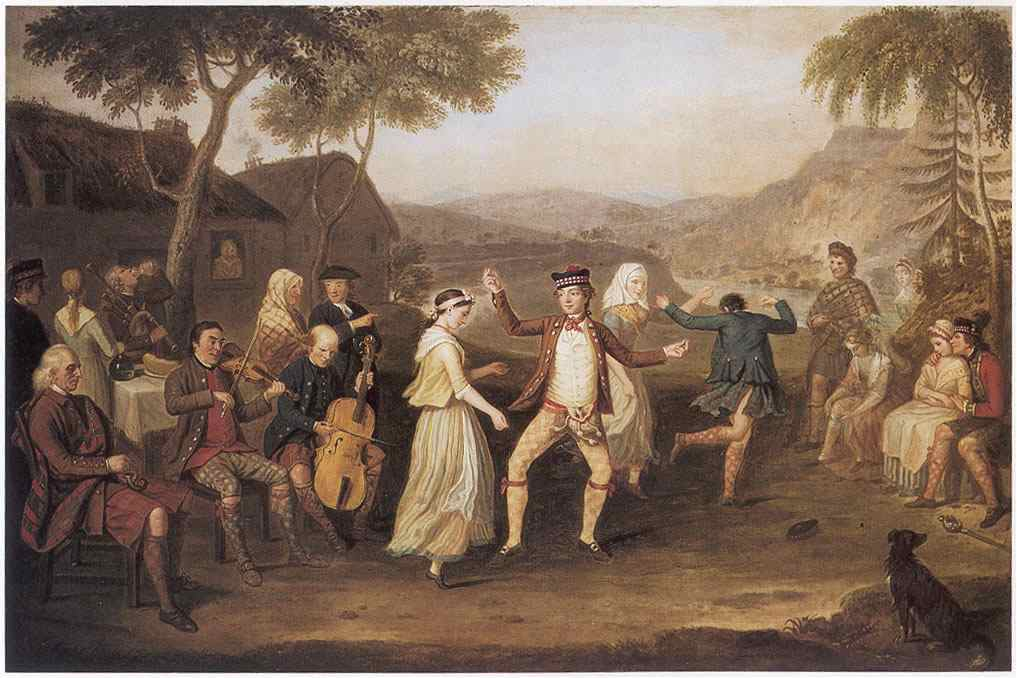
David Allan's painting of Highland wedding from 1780

Lowland Scotland was part of the pattern of late marriage for both men and women (between the mid and late 20s), with a relatively large proportion of the population remaining unmarried. In the Highland and Islands marriage ages may have been lower and more closely resembled Gaelic Ireland. Throughout the period, girls could legally marry from the age of 12 and boys from 14. However, while many girls from the social elite married in their teens, most in the Lowlands only married after a period of life-cycle service, in their twenties. Normally marriage followed handfasting, a period of betrothal, which in the Highlands may have effectively been a period of trial marriage, in which sexual activity may have been accepted as legitimate. Marriages, particularly higher in society, were often political in nature and the subject of complex negotiations over the tocher (dowry). Some mothers took a leading role in negotiating marriages, as Lady Glenorchy did for her children in the 1560s and 1570s. They could also act as matchmakers, finding suitable and compatible partners for others.

In the Middle Ages marriage was a sacrament and the key element in validity was consent. The sacramental status was removed at the Reformation, but the centrality of consent remained. Weddings were often elaborate occasions for public celebration and feasting. Among the poor, the tradition of the penny wedding developed, by which guests contributed to the costs of occasion. There was usually a meal after the ceremony, sometimes followed by music and dancing. These events were strongly discouraged by the Reformed Kirk, particularly in the Lowlands where the Kirk had greatest control, but opposition began to ease from about 1715 to 1725. Unlike in England, after the Reformation, "Irregular marriage", without a church ceremony or any residence qualifications, remained valid if promises were made between the couple in front of witnesses. From the 1730s the border settlements of Coldstream Bridge, Lamberton Toll, and most famously Gretna Green, developed local industries in private and rapid marriages for English couples wishing to take advantage of the more flexible Scottish marriage laws, undertaken by individuals who declared themselves marriage priests. This business would expand rapidly after the passage of Lord Hardwicke's Marriage Act in 1754, which completely ended irregular marriages in England, but not in Scotland.

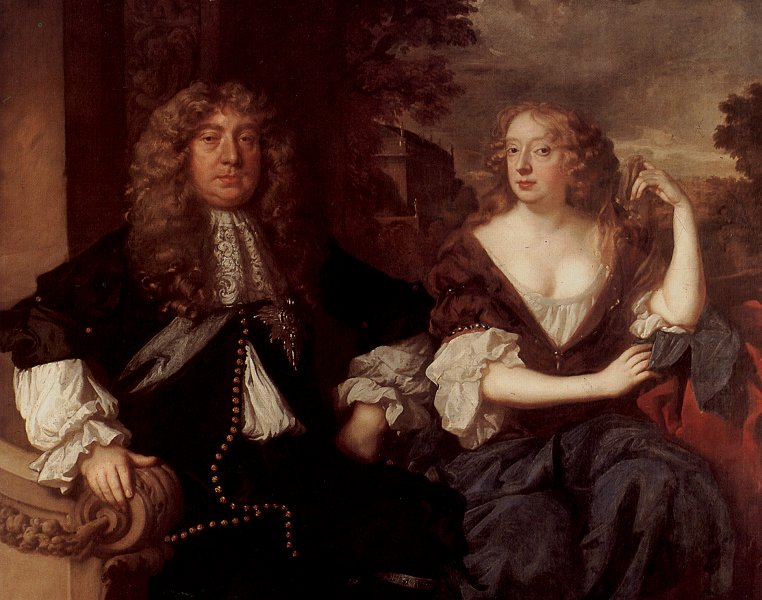
John Maitland, 1st Duke of Lauderdale and his wife Elizabeth Murry, Duchess of Lauderdale

While among the wealthy, married women often focused on running the household, lower down in society they also worked with their husbands. In rural Scotland this would have included taking part in all the major agricultural tasks around the farm. They had a particular role as shearers in the harvest, forming most of the reaping team of the bandwin. In the Highlands they may have been even more significant as workers as there is evidence that many men considered agricultural work to be beneath their status and in places they may have formed the majority of the rural workforce. There was a stress on a wife's duties to her husband and on the virtues of chastity and obedience. How exactly patriarchy worked in practice is difficult to discern. Scottish women in this period had something of a reputation among foreign observers for being forthright individuals, with the Spanish ambassador to the court of James IV (r. 1488–1513) noting that they were "absolute mistresses of their houses and even their husbands".

Before the Reformation, the extensive prohibited degrees of kinship, up to the fourth degree through consanguinity, meant that most noble marriages necessitated a papal dispensation. This could later be used as grounds for annulment if the marriage proved politically or personally inconvenient, although there was no divorce as such. After the mid-sixteenth century the prohibited degrees were reduced to those in Leviticus 13: 4–13, which limited them to relationships in the second degree of kinship. Separation from bed and board continued to be allowed in exceptional circumstances, usually adultery, and under the Reformed Kirk divorce was allowed on grounds of adultery or desertion. Scotland was one of the first countries to allow desertion as legal grounds for divorce and, unlike England, where divorce necessitated and act of parliament, divorce cases were initiated relatively far down the social scale.

== Widowhood ==
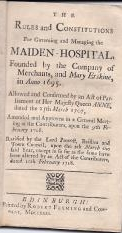
Front page from The Rules and Constitutions for Governing and Managing the Maiden-Hospital, founded by the Company of Merchants, and Mary Erskine, in Anno 1695

Given very high mortality rates, women could inherit important responsibilities from their fathers and from their husbands as widows. Evidence from towns indicates that around one in five households were headed by women who often continued to run an existing business interest. In noble society, widowhood created some very wealthy and powerful women. These included Catherine Campbell (d. 1578), who became the richest widow in the kingdom when her husband, the ninth earl of Crawford, died in 1558. The twice-widowed Margaret Ker, dowager Lady Yester, was described in 1635 as having "the greatest conjunct fie [fiefdom] that any lady hes in Scotland" and she proved the funds for Lady Yester's Kirk in Edinburgh.

There is evidence of widows engaging in independent economic activity. They can be found keeping schools, brewing ale and trading. Some were highly successful, like Janet Fockart, an Edinburgh wadwife or moneylender, who had been left a widow with seven children after her third husband's suicide, and who managed her business affairs so successfully that she had amassed a moveable estate of £22,000 by her death in the late sixteenth century. The deaths of the two husbands of Mary Erskine (1629–1708) left her with the resources to become a highly successful business woman and philanthropist, founding the Mary Erskine School and the Trades Maiden Hospital in Edinburgh. Lower down the social scale the rolls of poor relief indicate that large numbers of widows with children endured a marginal existence and were particularly vulnerable in times of economic hardship. This may in part explain the relatively high rates of remarriage suggested by the available sources. Many widows needed financial security and widowers often needed heirs or a mother for their children. Although contemporary writers seem to have been generally pessimistic about the step-parent relationships that these remarriages created, the evidence of diaries and autobiographies from the period suggest that they were often highly successful, with many children remembering their step-parents with genuine affection.

== Death ==
In the late Middle Ages, Scottish people, like most of Catholic Europe, were increasingly concerned with prayers for the dead, necessary to speed passage from Purgatory to Heaven. The upper nobility began to turn from patronage for monasteries to the establishing collegiate churches to pray for them, such as Lord Dummond's foundation at Innerpeffray in 1508 and Lord Fleming's re-establishment at Biggar in 1546. Those lower down in society paid for shrines, priests and masses, leading to a proliferation of altars, clergy and services within existing churches. In the burghs the primary function of craft guilds was to pay for the funerals and masses of their members. By the early sixteenth century St. Mary's in Dundee had perhaps 48 altars and St Giles' in Edinburgh over 50.

After the Reformation, the Mass and Purgatory were rejected by the Kirk, along with the efficacy of good works and prayers for the dead. In place of elaborate processions and masses at a funeral there was a simple service, where the body was taken to its resting place without singing and readings and interred soberly without ceremony. Unlike other reformed churches the Kirk also rejected burial inside the church, which were now seen as unseemly for a house of prayer. This caused friction with traditional rights, particularly of local notables, to be buried with their ancestors. The use of burial aisles, an extension projecting for the main body of the church, almost exclusively used for burial and commemoration, represented a uniquely Scottish solution to this problem. For most ranks in society the kirkyard remained the desired place of burial. From the seventeenth century burials were increasingly marked by gravestones, often including inscriptions that indicated affection for and the virtues of the deceased.

== Bibliography ==
- Anderson, R., "The history of Scottish Education pre-1980", in T. G. K. Bryce and W. M. Humes, eds, Scottish Education: Post-Devolution (Edinburgh: Edinburgh University Press, 2nd edn., 2003), ISBN 0-7486-1625-X..
- Armstrong, J. W., "The 'fyre of ire Kyndild' in the fifteenth-century Scottish Marches", in S. A. Throop and P. R. Hyams, eds, Vengeance in the Middle Ages: Emotion, Religion and Feud (Aldershot: Ashgate, 2010), ISBN 075466421X.
- Barrell, A. D. M., Medieval Scotland (Cambridge: Cambridge University Press, 2000), ISBN 052158602X.
- Barrow, G. W. S., Robert Bruce (Berkeley CA.: University of California Press, 1965).
- Bawcutt P. J., and Williams, J. H., A Companion to Medieval Scottish Poetry (Woodbridge: Brewer, 2006), ISBN 1843840960.
- Brown, K., Noble Society in Scotland: Wealth, Family and Culture from Reformation to Revolution (Edinburgh: Edinburgh University Press, 2004), ISBN 0748612998.
- Dawson, J. E. A., Scotland Re-Formed, 1488–1587 (Edinburgh: Edinburgh University Press, 2007), ISBN 0748614559.
- Ewan, E., Innes, S. and Reynolds, S., eds, The Biographical Dictionary of Scottish Women: From the Earliest Times to 2004 (Edinburgh: Edinburgh University Press, 2006), ISBN 074863293X.
- Ewen, E., "The early modern family" in T. M. Devine and J. Wormald, eds, The Oxford Handbook of Modern Scottish History (Oxford: Oxford University Press, 2012), ISBN 0199563691.
- Gillis, J. R., For Better, For Worse, British Marriages, 1600 to the Present (Oxford: Oxford University Press, 1985), ISBN 019503614X.
- Green, M. J., The Celtic World (London: Routledge, 1996), ISBN 0415146275.
- Hollander, M., "'The name of the Father'": baptism and the social construction of fatherhood in early modern Edinburgh", in E. Ewan and J. Nugent, eds, Finding the Family in Medieval and Early Modern Scotland (Aldershot: Ashgate, 2008), ISBN 0754660494.
- Houston, R. A., Scottish Literacy and the Scottish Identity: Illiteracy and Society in Scotland and Northern England, 1600–1800 (Cambridge: Cambridge University Press, 2002), ISBN 0-521-89088-8.
- Lawrence, A., "Women in the British Isles in the sixteenth century", in R. Tittler and N. Jones, eds, A Companion to Tudor Britain (Oxford: Blackwell John Wiley & Sons, 2008), ISBN 1405137401.
- Lynch, M., The Early Modern Town in Scotland (London: Taylor & Francis, 1987), ISBN 0709916779.
- Mitchison, R., Lordship to Patronage, Scotland 1603–1745 (Edinburgh: Edinburgh University Press, 1983), ISBN 074860233X.
- Moody, D., Scottish Family History (Baltimore, MD: Genealogical Publishing Com, 1994), ISBN 0806312688.
- Mullan, D. G., "Parents and children in early modern Scotland", in E. Ewan and J. Nugent, eds, Finding the Family in Medieval and Early Modern Scotland (Aldershot: Ashgate, 2008), ISBN 0754660494.
- Porter, J., "Introduction" in J. Porter, ed., Defining Strains: The Musical Life of Scots in the Seventeenth Century (Peter Lang, 2007), ISBN 3039109480.
- Rackwitz, M., Travels to Terra Incognita: The Scottish Highlands and Hebrides in Early Modern Travellers' Accounts c. 1600 to 1800 (Waxmann Verlag, 2009, ISBN 383091699X.
- Roberts, J. L., Clan, King, and Covenant: History of the Highland Clans from the Civil War to the Glencoe Massacre (Edinburgh: Edinburgh University Press, 2000), ISBN 0748613935.
- Spicer, A., "'Defyle not Christ kirk with your carrion': burial and the development of burial aisles in post-Reformation Scotland", in B. Gordon and P. Marshall, eds, The Place of the Dead: Death and Remembrance in Late Medieval and Early Modern Europe (Cambridge, Cambridge University Press, 2000), ISBN 0-521-64256-6.
- Todd, M., The Culture of Protestantism in Early Modern Scotland (Yale University Press, 2002), ISBN 0-300-09234-2.
- Wormald, J., Court, Kirk, and Community: Scotland, 1470–1625 (Edinburgh: Edinburgh University Press, 1991), ISBN 0748602763.
