= John Jardine (minister) =

Church of Scotland minister

John Jardine (3 January 1716 – 30 May 1766) was a Church of Scotland minister who served as Dean of the Chapel Royal, Dean of the Thistle Chapel and Chaplain in Ordinary to the King. He was a close friend of the Edinburgh author John Home (who was a distant cousin of his wife), and also of David Hume and Henry Home, Lord Kames.

== Life ==
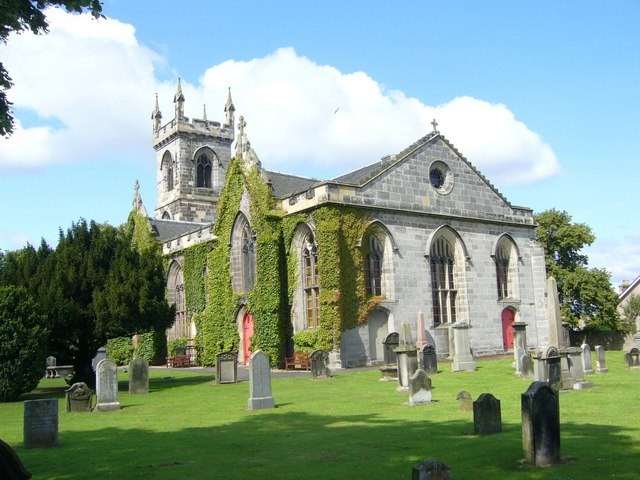
Liberton Kirk.

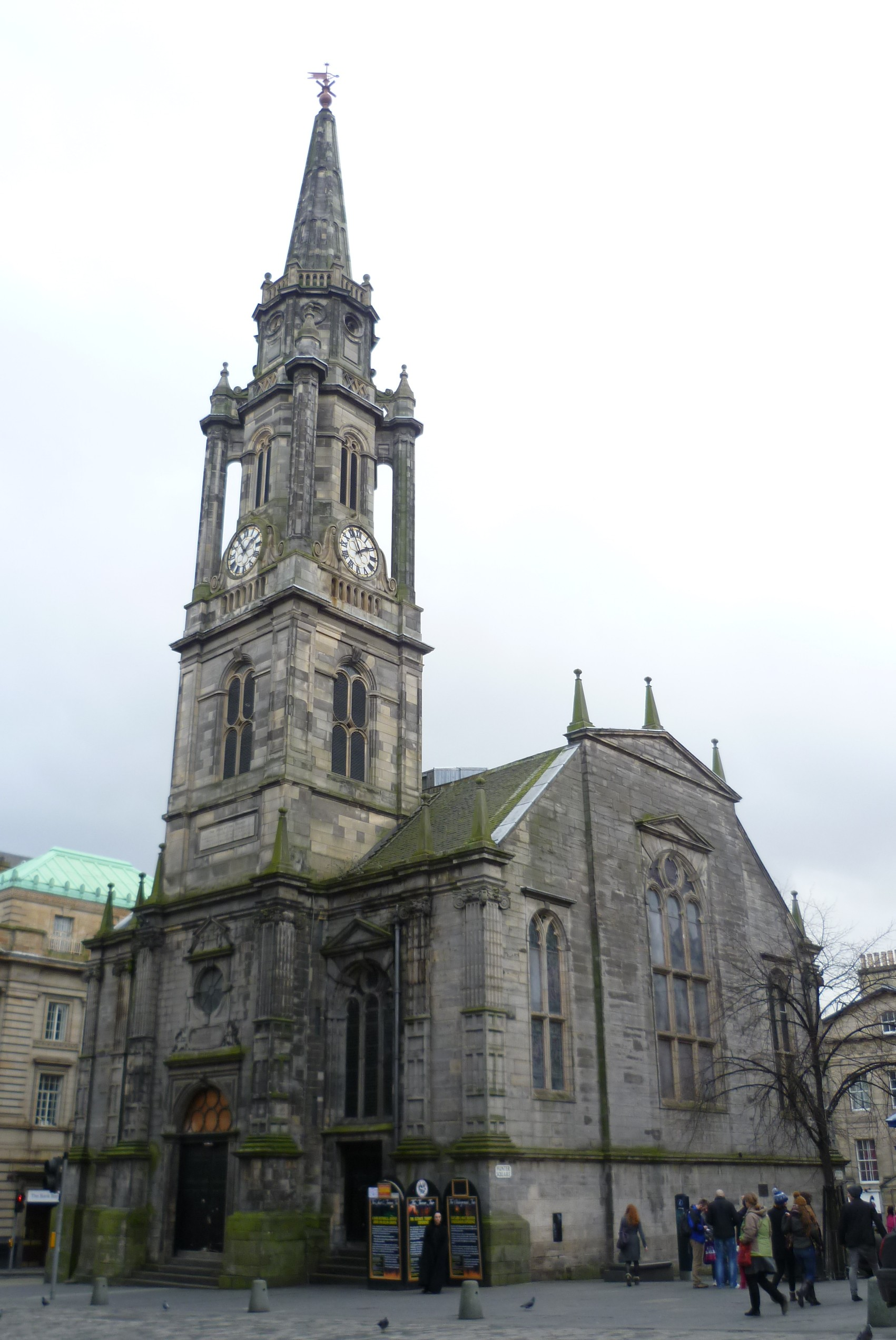
Tron Kirk on the Royal Mile.

He was born on 3 January 1716 the son of Reverend Robert Jardine, and his wife Janet Rannie. His father was minister of Cummertrees at the time of his birth but relocated to Glencairn in 1719 and settled in Lochmaben near Dumfries in 1732. There is no mention of any formal training but he was licensed to preach as a Church of Scotland minister by the Presbytery of Lochmaben in September 1736.

It took five years to find a posting, and only in July 1741 was he ordained as minister of parish Liberton, just south of Edinburgh. He was translated to Lady Yester's Church in the city in 1750 and in October 1754 transferred to the Tron Kirk on Edinburgh on the Royal Mile as an assistant of Rev. George Wishart.

St Andrews University awarded him an honorary Doctorate of Divinity in 1758. In 1759, he was appointed Chaplain in Ordinary to King George II of Great Britain continuing as Chaplain to King George III on the death of the former. In 1761, he was created Dean of the Chapel Royal and in 1763 Dean of the Order of the Thistle.

During the summer of 1763, Jardine met James Boswell at Lord Eglinton's house in London. Boswell described Jardine as "a hard-headed, jolly dog".

He died suddenly while attending the General Assembly of the Church of Scotland on 30 May 1766 aged only 50.

His job at Tron Kirk was appointed to John Drysdale.

== Family ==
In 1744 he married Jean Drummond, eldest daughter of George Drummond, the Lord Provost of Edinburgh. The couple had several children.

- Robert d.1747 in infancy
- George Jardine WS (b.1753)
- John (1759-1763)
- Janet (1762-1840). Married her cousin George Home Drummond of Blair Drummond; they were parents of Henry Home-Drummond.
- Sir Henry Jardine FRSE WS (1766-1851)

== Publications ==
Jardine worked on a history of the Jacobite Rebellion of 1745 but it was never published.
