= John Drysdale (moderator) =

Church of Scotland minister; (1718–1788)

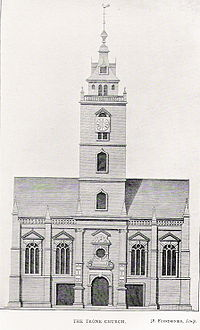
Engraving of the Tron Kirk as it looked in 1766

John Drysdale FRSE (29 April 1718 – 16 June 1788) was twice Moderator of the General Assembly of the Church of Scotland, both in 1773 and in 1784. He was Dean of the Chapel Royal in Scotland 1766 to 1788, and Chaplain in Ordinary to George III. He was brother-in-law to Robert Adam and father-in-law to Andrew Dalzell.

== Life ==
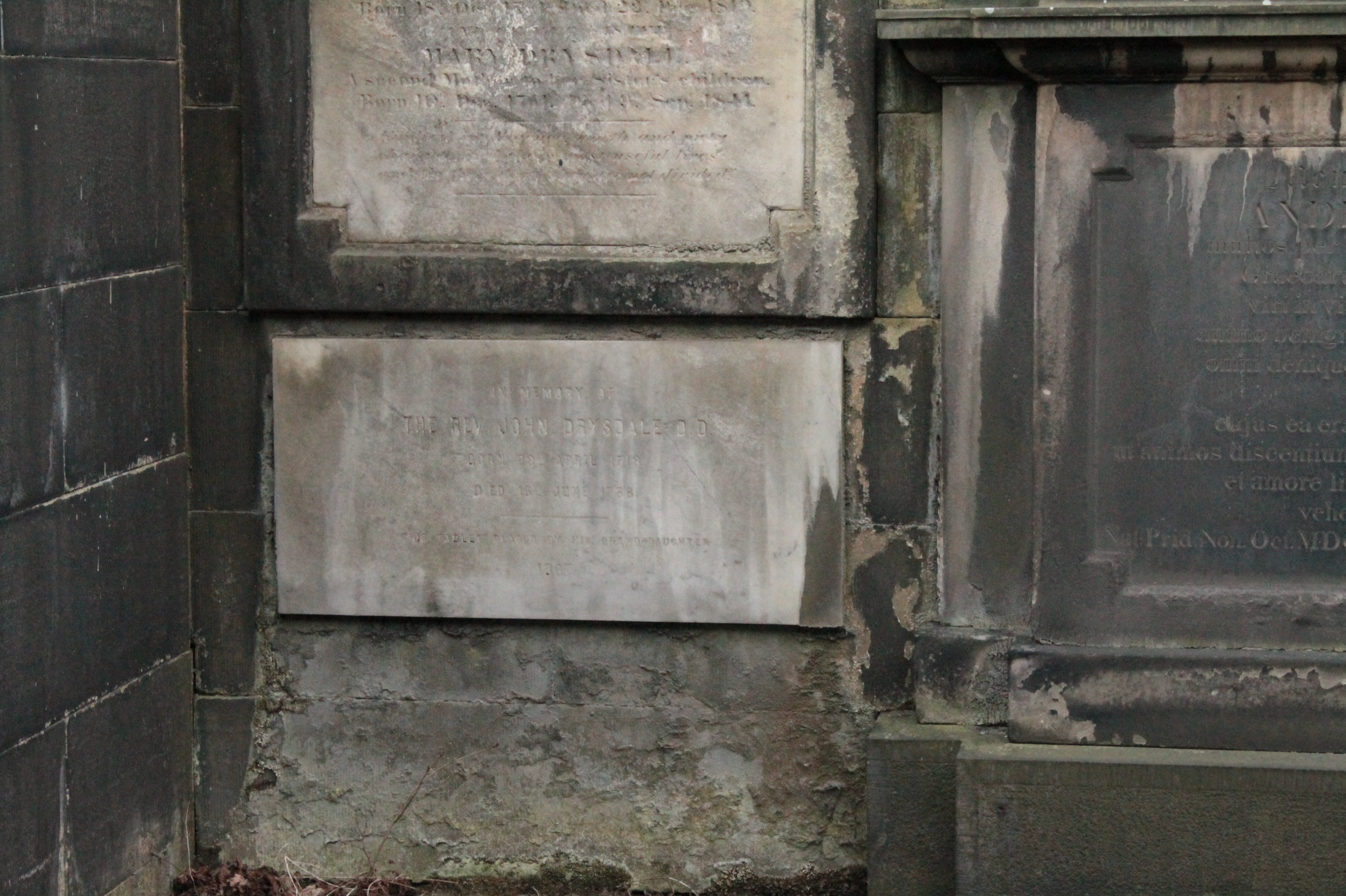
Memorial to Rev John Drysdale DD, Adam Mausoleum, Greyfriars Kirkyard

Drysdale was born in Kirkcaldy in Fife on 29 April 1714, the third son of Anne Ferguson and her husband, Rev John Drysdale, minister of Kirkcaldy Parish Church. His maternal grandfather, William Ferguson, was Provost of Kirkcaldy.

He was educated at Kirkcaldy Parish School alongside Adam Smith and James Oswald each of whom became a lifelong friend. In 1732 John was sent to the University of Edinburgh to study classics, philosophy and theology, though taking no final degree. Around 1736 he began to specialise in divinity. He was licensed as a minister by the Presbytery of Kirkcaldy in 1740. His early service was as assistant in the Trinity College Church in Edinburgh.

In August 1749 he was ordained as minister of Kirkliston under the patronage of Lord Hopetoun. In August 1764 he translated to Lady Yester’s Kirk in Edinburgh (through the recommendation of James Oswald and Lord Bute) and in 1765 Aberdeen University awarded him an honorary Doctor of Divinity.

In October 1767 he moved to the prestigious Tron Kirk (as "second charge" under Rev George Wishart), following the sudden death (at the General Assembly) of Rev Dr John Jardine. This role ran concurrently with being Dean of the Chapel Royal to George III. The University of Aberdeen granted him an honorary doctorate (DD) in 1765.

In terms of the General Assembly of the Church of Scotland he served as Moderator in 1773, Principal Clerk from 1778, and Moderator for the second time in 1784.

In 1775, he is listed as living at Shakespeare Square in Edinburgh. This now-demolished square stood at the eastern end of Princes Street with the Theatre Royal as its centrepiece.

He was elected a Fellow of the Royal Society of Edinburgh in 1784. His proposers were William Robertson, Henry Grieve and William Robertson, Lord Robertson.

He died at his home 3 Princes Street on 16 June 1788. He is buried in Greyfriars Kirkyard in the Adam family vault next to the Robertson vault, south-west of the church.

His house was demolished around 1900 to build a Woolworths store. It is now the Apple Store.

== Family ==
In June 1749, he married Mary Adam daughter of William Adam and sister of Robert Adam and John Adam.

They had four daughters:

- Anne Drysdale (1751–1826) married Andrew Dalzell in 1786. Dalzell was Principal Clerk to the General Assembly of the Church of Scotland (the first lay-person to undertake this role) and the couple undoubtedly met through this connection.
- Wilhelmina (1757–1766)
- Mary (b.1760)
- Elizabeth (1767–1773)

== Publications ==
- The Sermons of John Drysdale DD (2 vols)
