= James Ramsay (minister) =

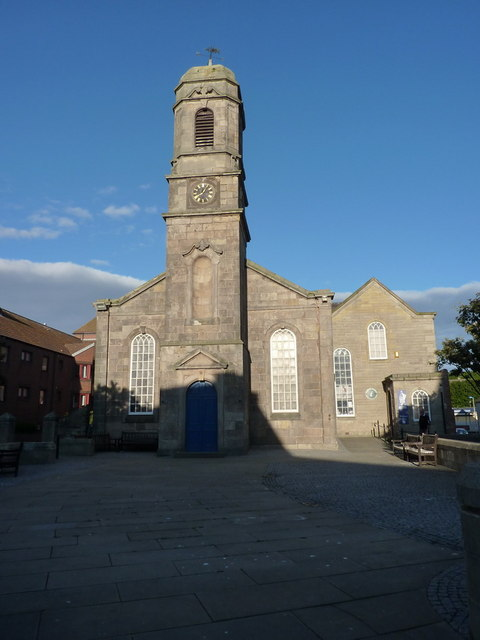
The Auld Kirk, Eyemouth

James Ramsay (1672–1749) was a Church of Scotland minister who served twice as Moderator of the General Assembly in both 1738 and 1741. He was Dean of the Chapel Royal from 1716 to 1726. At the time of his death in 1749 he was the acknowledged Father of the Church.

== Life ==
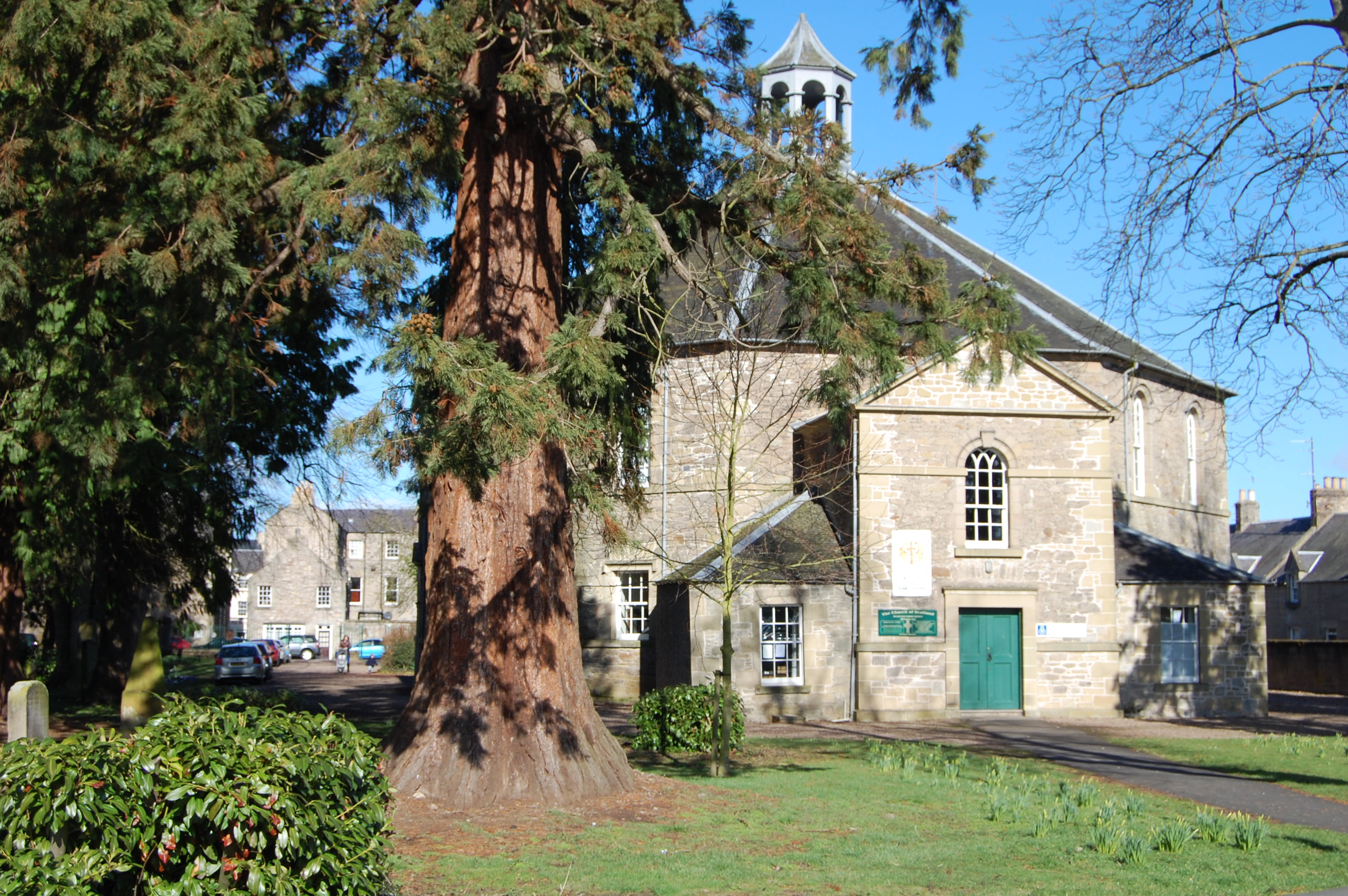
Kelso, Old Parish Kirk

He was born in central Scotland in 1672 and appears to be related to the Ramsays of Edington. He graduated MA at St Andrews University in 1687 (aged 15). He was licensed to preach by the Presbytery of Duns and Chirnside in November 1692.

He was ordained at Eyemouth Parish Church in May 1693. In September 1706 he translated to Kelso Psrish Church.

In November 1706 he unsuccessfully opposed the Scottish bishops' involvement with the forthcoming Act of Union 1707. In 1714 he was one of the several senior ministers sent by the General Assembly to congratulate King George I on his ascension to the throne. A Royalist, he strongly opposed both Jacobite rebellions, 1715 and 1745.

In 1716 he was elected Dean of the Chapel Royal in 1716 but stood down in 1726 when the Government changed.

In 1738 he succeeded Rev Alexander Anderson as Moderator of the General Assembly of the Church of Scotland the highest position in the Scottish church. In 1741 he was elected a second time, succeeding Rev George Logan. He is said to have walked the 45 miles from Kelso to Edinburgh to join the General Assembly, probably over two or three days.

He died on 3 July 1749. He is almost certainly buried at Kelso, possibly under the floor of the church itself (which was still the habit in rural parishes at this time. His position as minister was filled by Rev Cornelius Lundie, grandson of Rev James Lundie.

== Family ==
Around 1694 he married Alison Nisbet daughter of William Nisbet, an Eyemouth merchant. They had one daughter, Jean Ramsay, who married William Hume the younger of Scotstoun.

In July 1731 he married Margaret Borthwick, daughter of Alexander Borthwick of Sauchnell and widow of Rev John Lauder of Eccles (a village north-east of Kelso). They had a daughter, Elizabeth Ramsay, who married Rev Robert Park of Foulden.

== Publications ==
- Letters from a Gentleman to a Member of Parliament Concerning Toleration (1703)
- Remarks Upon the Case of the Episcopal Clergy and those of the Episcopalian Persuasion (1703)
- Toleration's Fence Removed (1703)
- An Examination of Three Prelactical Pamphlets (1703)
