= James Lundie =

James Lundie may refer to:

- James Lundie (footballer)
- James Lundie (minister)
