= George Jamesone =

Scottish painter (c. 1587–1644)

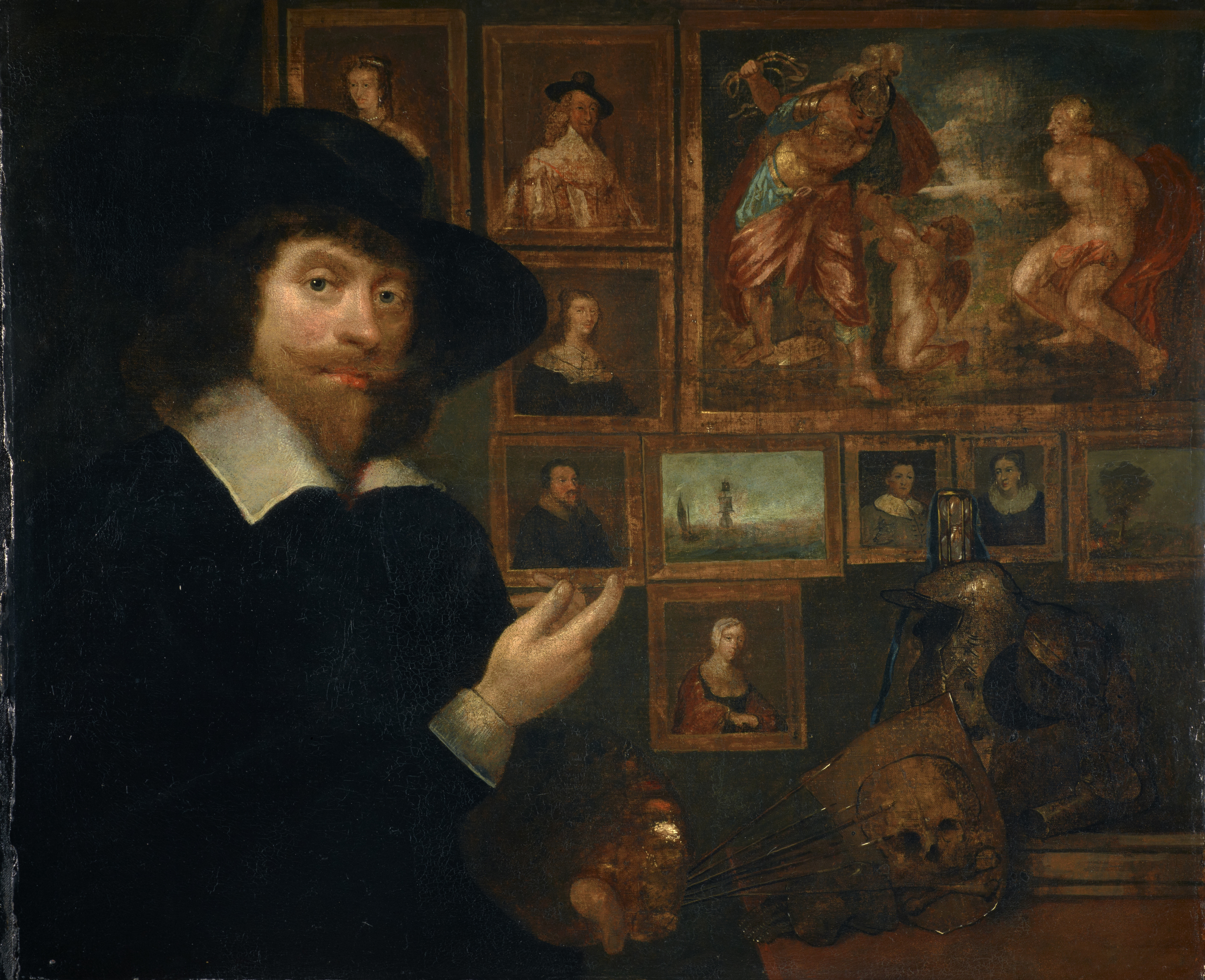
- Self-portrait of George Jamesone (c.1642), National Galleries of Scotland
- Born: c. 1587; Aberdeen
- Died: 1644; Edinburgh
- Resting place: Greyfriars Kirkyard, Edinburgh
- Education: Aberdeen Grammar School
- Spouse: Isabella Tosche

George Jamesone (or Jameson) (c. 1587 – 1644) was a Scottish painter who is regarded as Scotland's first eminent portrait-painter.

== Early years ==
He was born in Aberdeen, where his father, Andrew Jamesone, was a stonemason. His mother was Marjory Anderson. Jamesone attended the grammar school near his home on Schoolhill and is thought to have gone on to further education at Marischal College. Legend has it that Jamesone once studied under Rubens in Antwerp with Anthony van Dyck. This is, however, yet to be proven as his name does not appear to be noted on the Guild registers of the town. Since Rubens was exempt from registering pupils, the absence of Jamesone's name does not mean that the painter definitely did not study there.

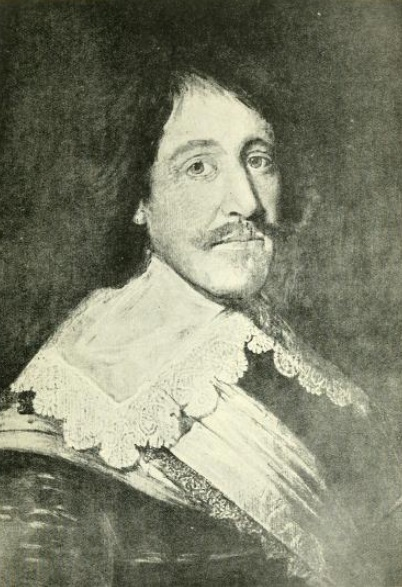
Photograph of now lost portrait of c.1644, attributed to George Jamesone, of Archibald Campbell, Marquess of Argyll, formerly at Castle Campbell. The painting, rediscovered in an estate cottage in c.1870, was destroyed in an 1877 fire at Inveraray Castle.

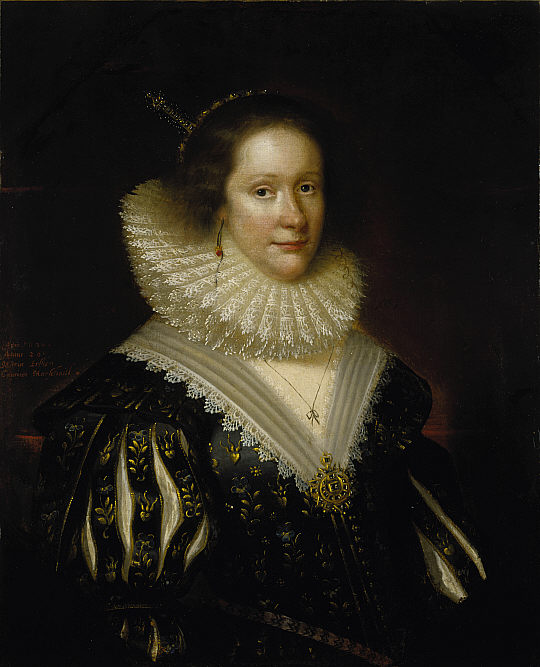
Mary Erskine

Jamesone certainly did complete an apprenticeship under the supervision of his uncle, John Anderson, who was a popular decorative painter in Edinburgh at the beginning of the seventeenth century. Jamesone finished this training in 1618. He is not recorded as being in Aberdeen again until 1620. If the Scotsman had gone to Antwerp, it would have had to have been between the years of 1618 to 1620.

== Career ==
While in Aberdeen, Jamesone made a name for himself painting portraits of local academics and scholars from the city's two feuding colleges: King's and Marischal. In 1633, when Charles I made his grand royal visit to Edinburgh, Jamesone rose from local to national fame. For this occasion the painter was asked to decorate a highly elaborate triumphal arch with the portraits of all the past kings of Scotland. He was also given the honour of painting the portrait of Charles himself. It has been said that the king was so pleased with the result that he gave Jamesone a ring off his own finger as a reward.

After hearing of the King's approval, many of the Scottish gentry desired to be painted by the now highly reputable George Jamesone. One of his finest examples is that of Mary Erskine which is on display at the National Gallery of Scotland. Jamesone had homes and studios in Aberdeen (on Schoolhill opposite St. Nicholas Kirk) and in Edinburgh (on the Royal Mile right next door to John Knox House). Having two bases allowed him to meet the demands of hundreds of patrons from the north to the south of the country.

Jamesone died in Edinburgh in 1644 and was buried in Greyfriars Kirkyard in the centre of the city. The grave is largely illegible but lies on the east wall of the original churchyard.

== Legacy ==
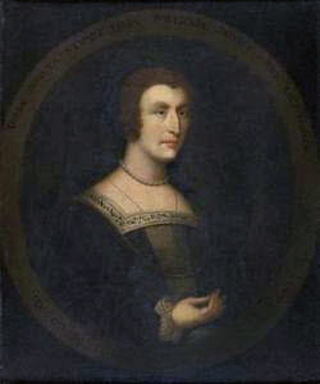
Lady Janet Stewart

Jamesone's pupil, John Michael Wright, also went on to be a highly important portrait painter in seventeenth century British art.

== Family ==
Although Jamesone had several children with his young Aberdonian wife Isabella Tosche, only one lived to adulthood. This was his youngest daughter Mary. Mary Jamesone inherited her father's artistic talents and excelled in the craft of needlework. Four examples of her dexterity, four scenes from the Old Testament and Apocrypha, can be seen to this day in St. Nicholas Kirk in Aberdeen.

== Sources ==
- Stevenson, J.H., ed. (1896). Scottish Antiquary or Northern Notes and Queries. Vol. XI. Edinburgh: T. and A. Constable. p. 101-102.
