= Dugald Butler =

Scottish minister and author

Dugald Butler (1862–1926) was a 19th/20th century Scottish minister, remembered as a prolific author on a variety of subjects, but mainly historical, most of which are still in print. He was minister of several important churches including the Tron Kirk on the Royal Mile in Edinburgh. He was an expert on Robert Leighton.

== Life ==
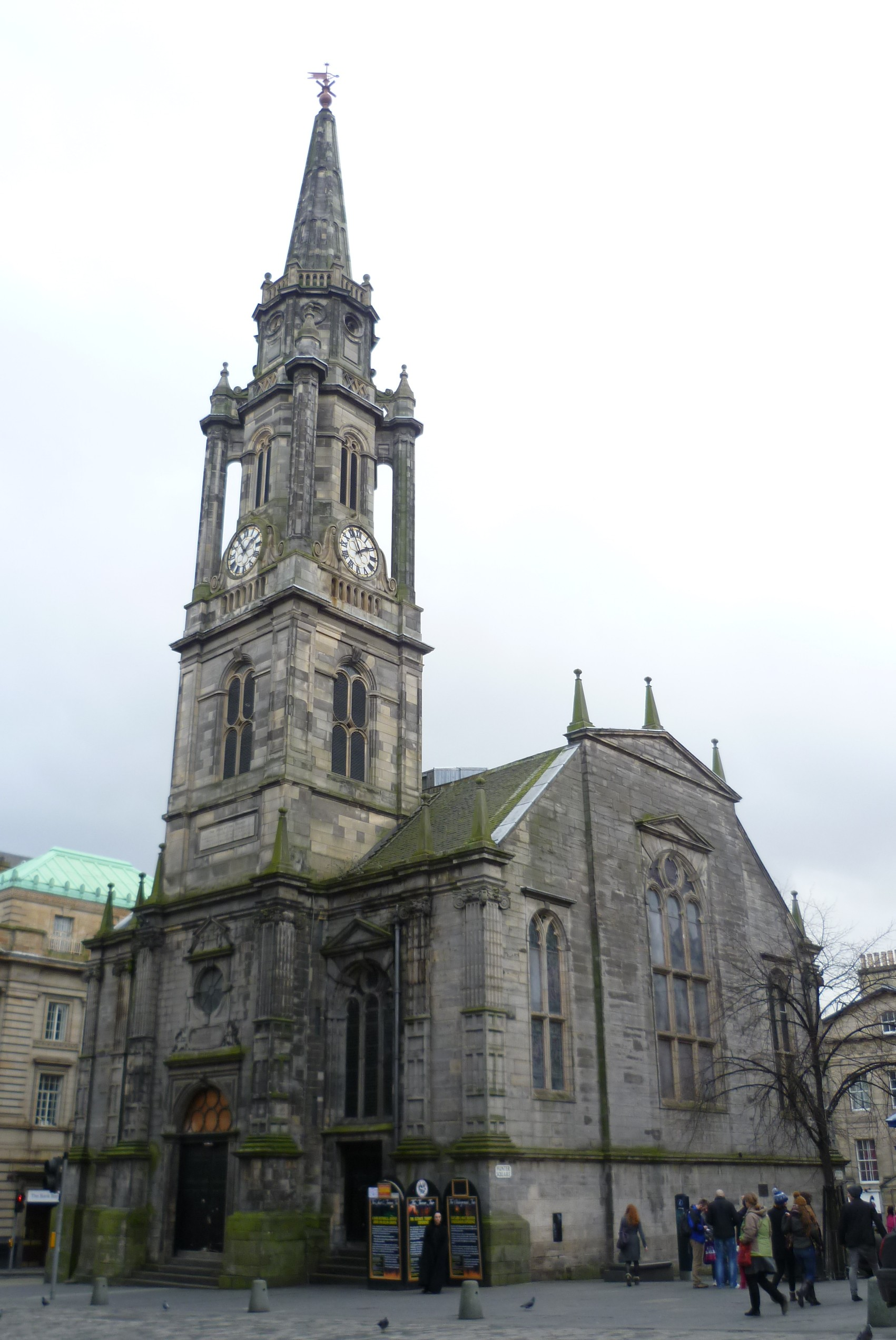
Tron Kirk, High Street, Edinburgh

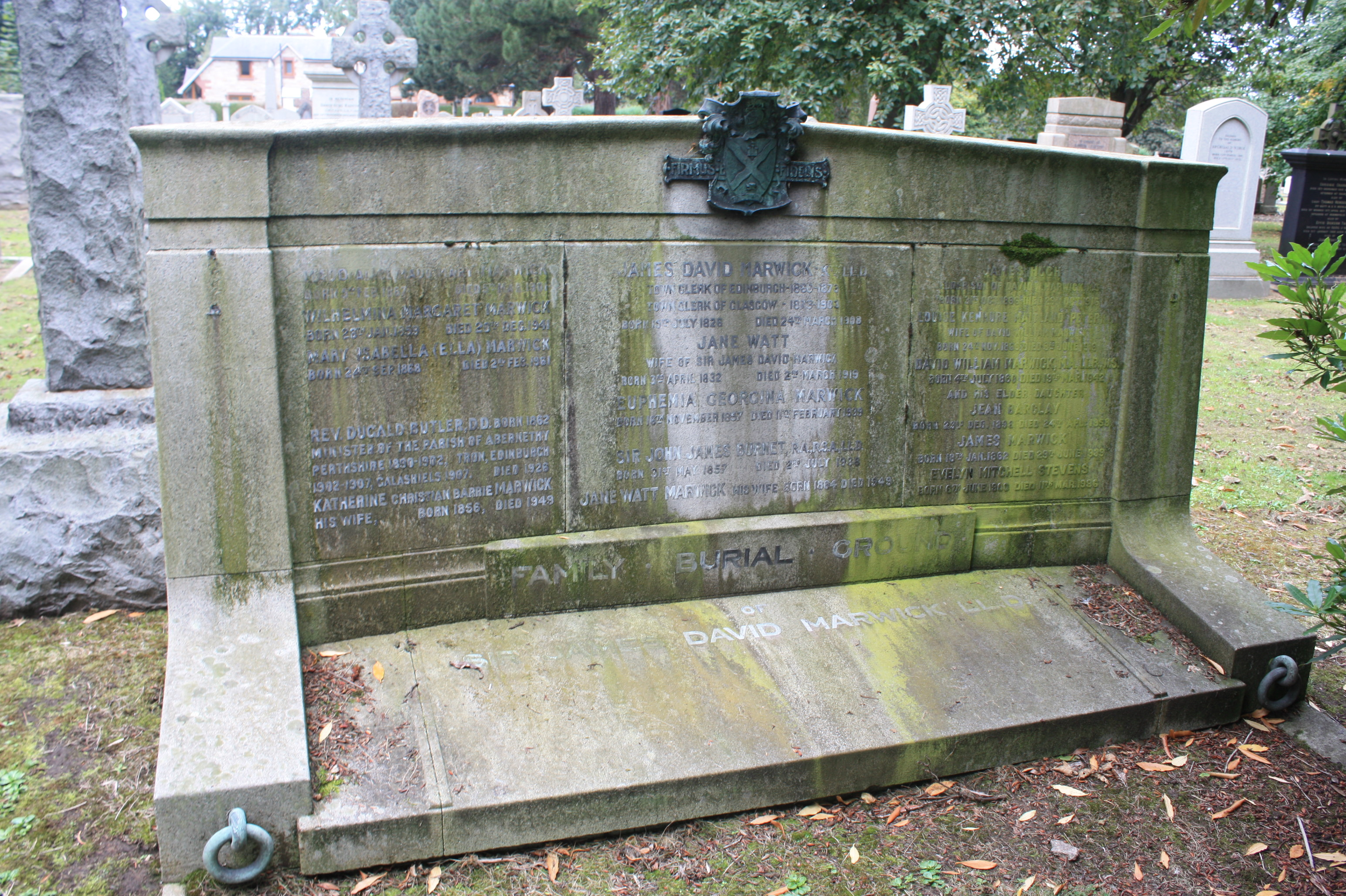
The grave of James David Marwick, Warriston Cemetery

He was born on 18 November 1862 in Glasgow the son of Dugald Butler of the Bridgeton Society. The family lived at 56 Rumford Street in the Dalmarnock district of Glasgow. He was educated at Glasgow High School then studied at Glasgow University graduating MA in 1883. He was licensed to preach as a Church of Scotland minister by the Presbytery of Dunoon in 1886.

His first role was as assistant to Rev Dr Kirk at New Kilpatrick then to Rev Dr Matheson at St Bernards Church in Stockbridge, Edinburgh. He was ordained as minister of Abernethy in September 1890. In 1902 he translated to the Tron Kirk in Edinburgh. In August 1907 he moved to Galashiels in the Scottish Borders. Glasgow University awarded him an honorary Doctor of Divinity in the same year.

He fell into ill-health in 1923 and died on 9 January 1926 and is buried in the Marwick burial plot in Warriston Cemetery in Edinburgh.

== Family ==
In April 1893 he married Catherine Christian Barrie Marwick eldest daughter of Sir James David Marwick LLD Town Clerk of Glasgow.

== Bibliography ==
=== Publications still in print ===
- The Ancient Church and Parish of Abernethy (1897)
- John Wesley and George Whitefield in Scotland (1898)
- Scottish Cathedrals
- Henry Scougal and the Oxford Methodists (1899)
- Scottish Cathedrals and Abbeys (with Robert Herbert Story) (1900)
- The Life and Letters of Archbishop Robert Leighton (1903) a 600 page tome
- Eternal Elements in the Christian Faith (1905)
- The Tron Kirk in Edinburgh (1906)
- Thomas a Kempis: A Religious Study (1908)
- Saint Cuthbert of Melrose (1913)
- Lindean and Galashiels (1914)

=== Publications out of print ===
- The Teaching of Emerson (1892)
- Gothic Architecture: Its Christian Origin and Inspiration (1910)
- Archbishop Leighton's Practice of the Presence of God (1911)
- Unity, Peace and Charity: a Tercentenary Lecture on Archbishop Leighton (1912)
- Woman and the Church in Scottish History (1912)
- George Fox in Scotland (1913)
- St Cuthbert (1913)
- St Giles (1914)
- Jottings of an Invalid (1924)
