= Elisabeth West =

Scottish servant and memoirist (died 1709)

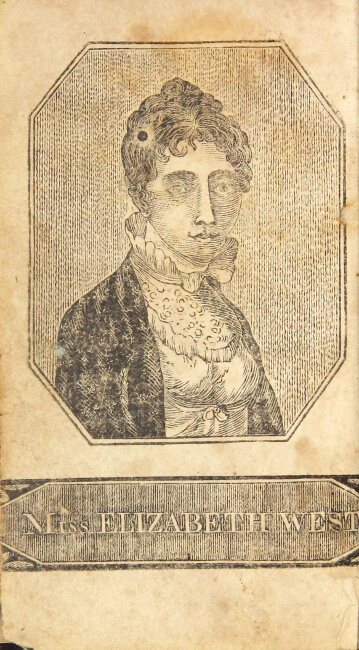
- a woodcut from an 1817 copy of her book
- Born: Edinburgh
- Died: after 1709
- Education: literate
- Occupation: servant
- Known for: memoirist

Elisabeth West (fl. 1690s – 1709) was a Scottish servant and memoirist in Edinburgh. She was inspired to create her record by Rev George Meldrum of the Tron Kirk, who would later become the Professor of Divinity at the University of Edinburgh. She was employed as a servant but she was also an early mistress at The Mary Erskine School. She was associated with the Cameronians and she opposed the Acts of Union 1707.

== Life ==
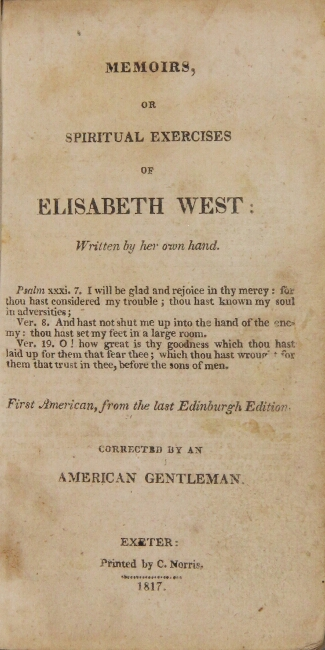
Elisabeth West's memoirs were published in the US in 1817

The details of her early life and parentage are unknown. The only details are that her father died in 1700 and she was taught well by her mother and an aunt. She is notable because she was a witness to an important time in Scottish political and religious history. She was first advised to keep a diary by George Meldrum who recommended it as a record of her soul.

The first record of her life covers her attendance at the Tron Kirk in Edinburgh. William Erskine was the minister and he died in May 1692. Erskine's replacement George Meldrum had a large effect upon West and she considered him to be her "Lord's messenger".

Her parish church was the Trinity College Kirk and the whole church was opposed to submitting to the authority of a bishop. Her parish minister was John Moncrieff and he had been charged for holding unauthorised religious non-conformist gatherings. After Meldrum it was John Flint who was another important influence. Flint was the Cameronian leaning minister at Lasswade. He seconded the proposal to keep a memoir but he also encouraged her to move to the more strict covenants of the Church of Scotland. She formally became a Church of Scotland communicant in August 1694. She was associated with the Cameronians and she opposed the union with England.

The Trades Maiden Hospital was founded in 1704 by Mrs Mary Erskine in Argyle Square. In 1708 West became the mistress at what would become The Mary Erskine School where she was teaching young children.

== Legacy ==
Her memoirs were published in 1766 (and 1798) as the Memoirs, or, Spiritual exercises of Elisabeth West, etc The memoirs were popular among the religious enthusiasm of the Cambuslang Work. Elisabeth West's memoirs were first published in the US in 1817 by subscription.
