= Tron Kirk =

Former church in Edinburgh, Scotland

Coordinates: 55°57′00″N 3°11′16″W

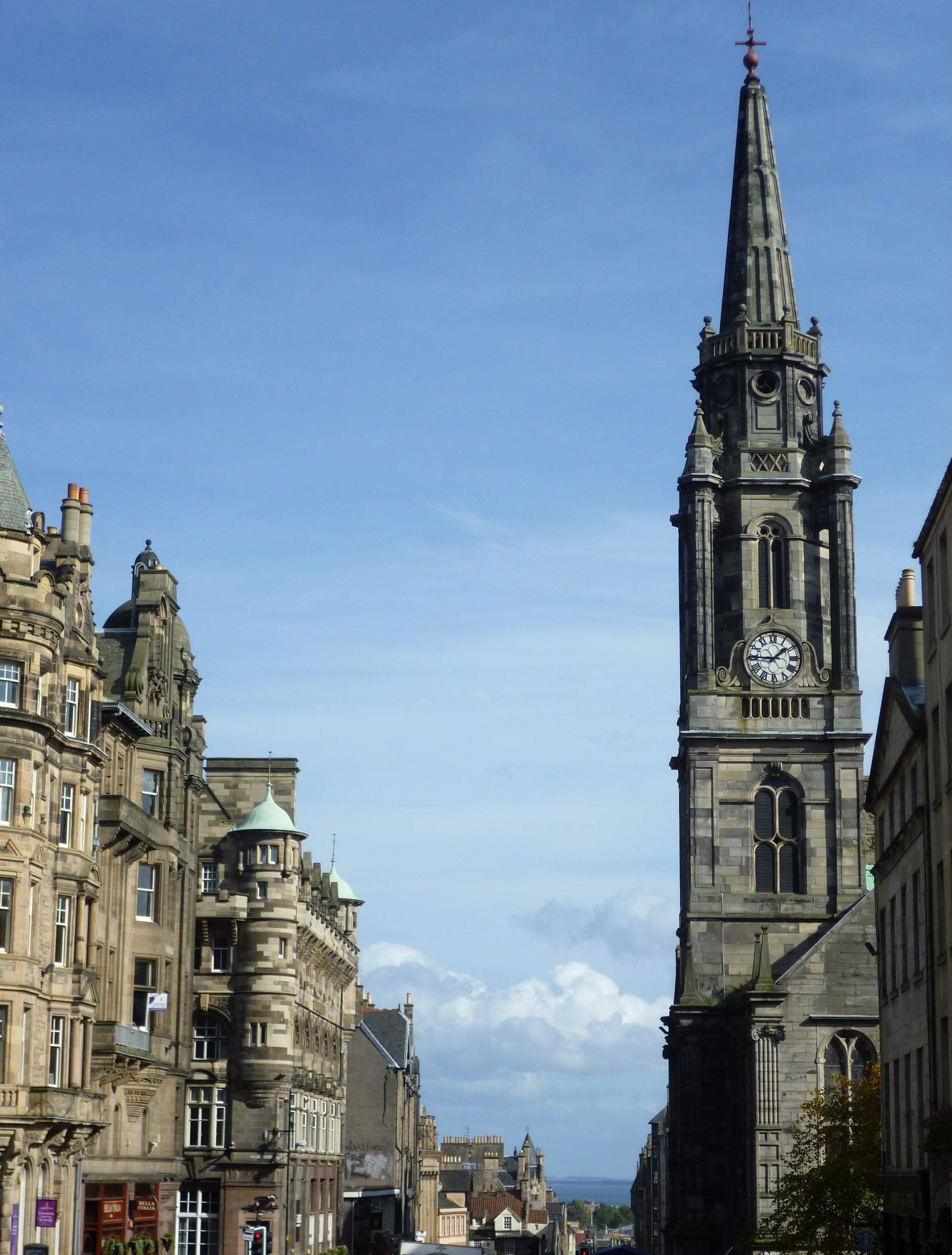
The Tron Kirk in Edinburgh's High Street

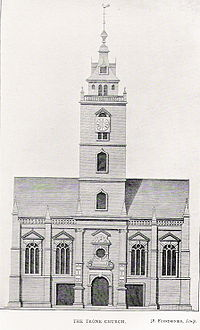
Engraving of the kirk as it looked before 1785

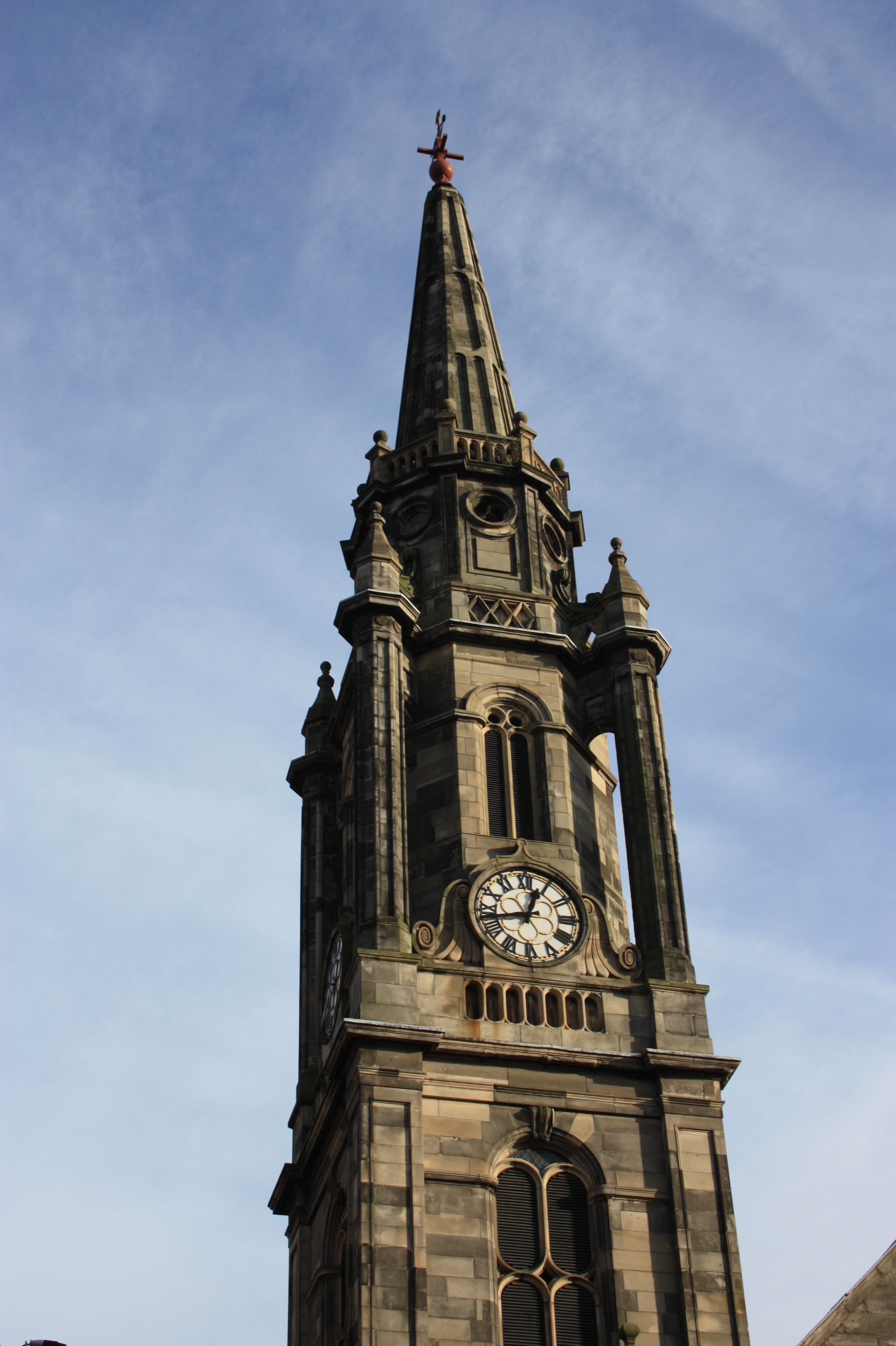
The stone spire of Tron Kirk by R & R Dickson

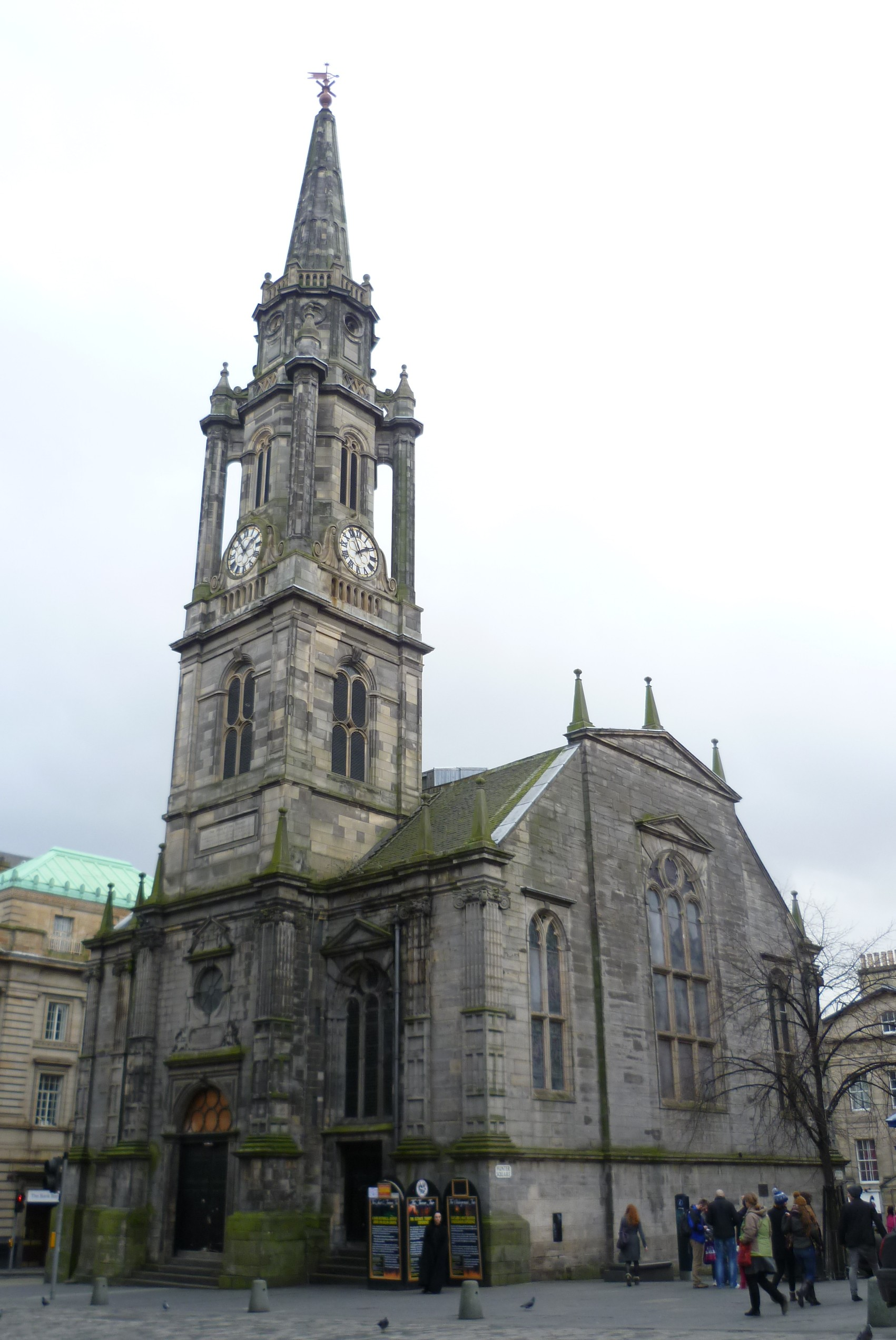
The Tron in 2012

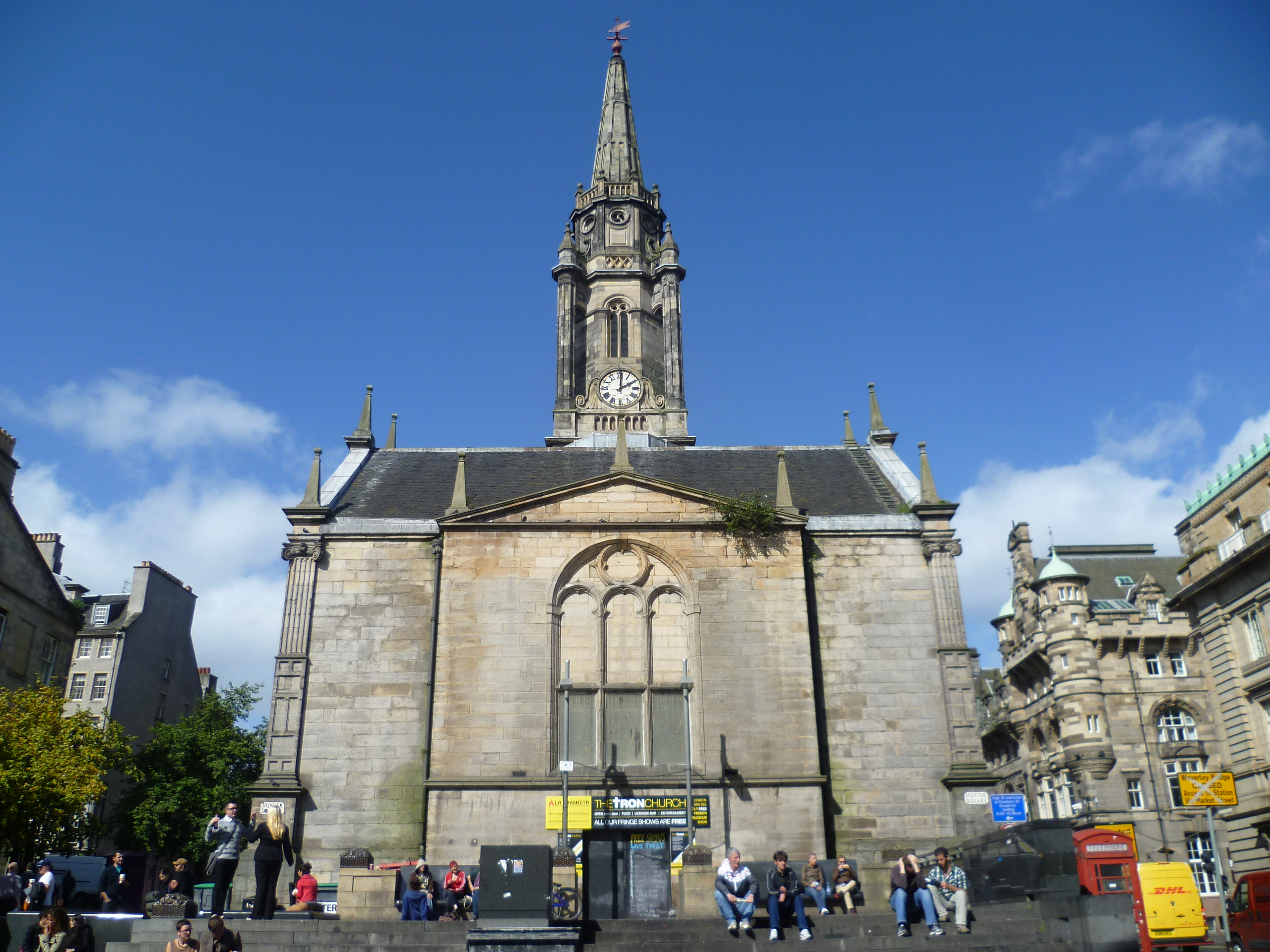
The rear of the kirk in Hunter Square has become a popular gathering place

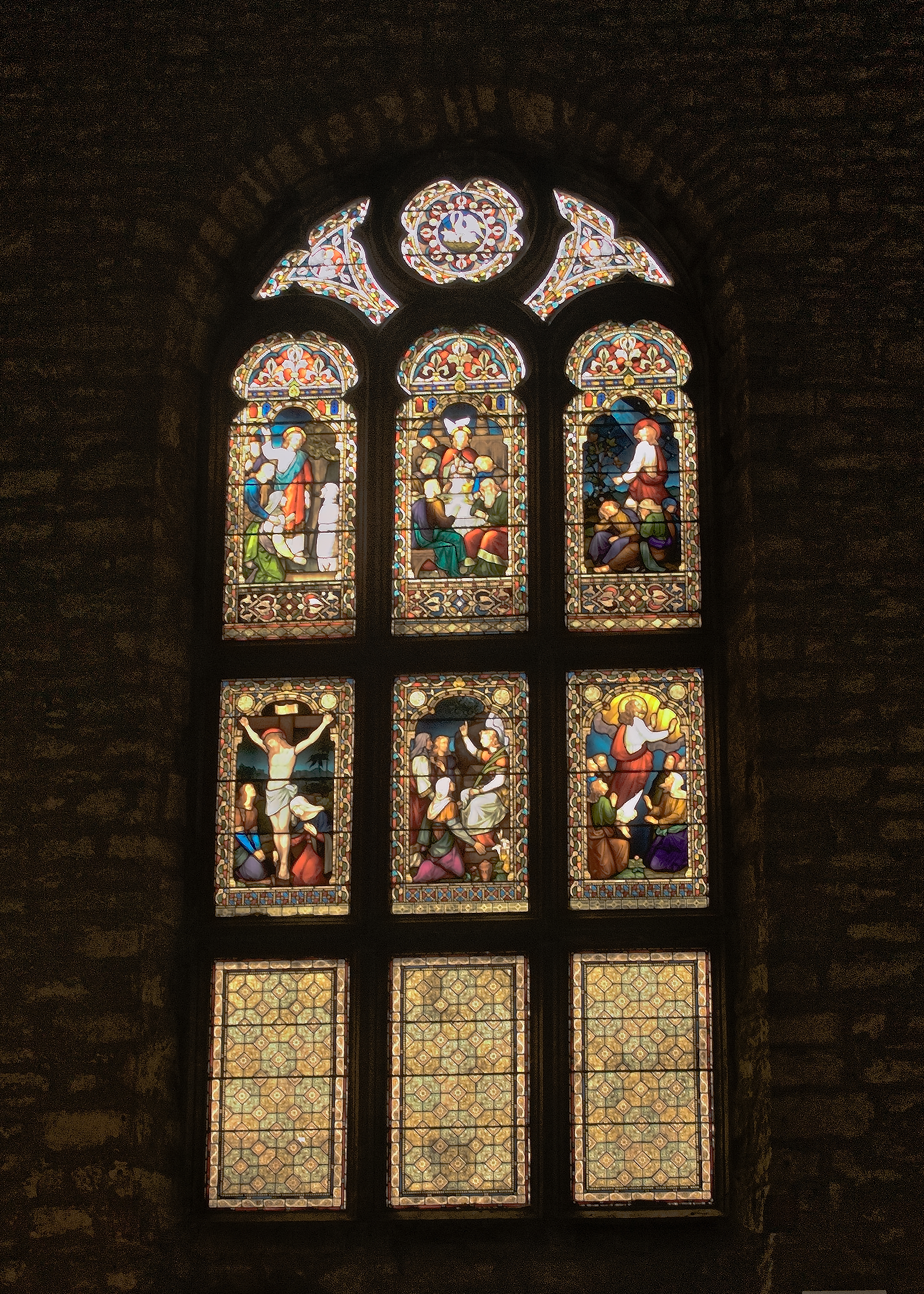
Stained glass inside Tron Kirk

The Tron Kirk is a former principal parish church in Edinburgh, Scotland. It is a well-known landmark on the Royal Mile. It was built in the 17th century and closed as a church in 1952. Having stood empty for over fifty years, it was used as a tourist information centre for several years in the mid 2000s and, more recently, was the site of the Edinburgh World Heritage Exhibition and John Kay’s book and gift shop.

The name comes from the weighing beam (tron in Scots), serving the public market on the Royal Mile, which stood outside until around 1800.

It is the only Scottish church where five consecutive ministers each served at least once as Moderator of the General Assembly of the Church of Scotland (eight if including second charge ministers).

== History ==
=== Archaeology and pre-church history ===
Archaeological investigations, including excavations and 3D surveys, in 1974, 1983 and 2006 shed light on the area before the construction of the church in the 1630s. The results evidenced that the area was occupied by tenements before the church was built. It appears that they were built during the 15th and 16th centuries and wiped out all traces of earlier medieval settlements. Documentary research undertaken at the same time was able to provide a picture of the occupants of the buildings back to the late 15th century. The church was built over:

- Marlin's Wynd
- Peebles Wynd
- Taverner's Close

=== Religious history ===
The Tron, as it is commonly called, was ordered to be built by King Charles I when he decided that St Giles' was to become the cathedral for the new see of Edinburgh. The land was purchased by the parish from Dr. William Scott, MD, for £1000 Scots. The foundation stone was laid on 4 March 1637. It was erected between 1637 and 1647 to a design by John Mylne, Royal master mason. The design mixed Palladian and Gothic elements and was inspired by contemporary Dutch architecture. The full Chamberlain's Accounts for this project are extant.

The church was formally opened and dedicated to Christ by the citizens of Edinburgh in 1641, and known as "Christ's Kirk at the Tron". It was built for the South-East parish, one of the four parishes of Edinburgh after the Scottish Reformation of 1560. Prior to the erection of this new church, parishioners of the North-West parish worshipped in St. Giles' Cathedral. An English traveller, visiting the Tron in 1705, recorded his impression in his diary:—

The Nobility generally resort to the Tron Church, which is the principally (sic) and the Lord High Commissioner has a Throne erected in it, in a very spatious Gallery, on his right hand sits the Lord Chancellor, and on his left the Lord Provost of Edenborough.

There were special grants of pews made by the Edinburgh Town Council to noblemen, Senators of the College of Justice, citizens of Edinburgh Old Town, Principals and Professors of the University. A full list of seat-holders has been preserved for 1650, the year of the battle of Dunbar, and for 1745, when Bonnie Prince Charlie was in Edinburgh.

The width of the building was reduced when both side aisles were removed in 1785 to accommodate the South Bridge and Blair Street leading to Hunter Square. In 1828 a new spire (designed by R & R Dickson) was constructed to replace the original, destroyed in the Great Edinburgh Fire of November 1824.

The church held its last service on Sunday 21 September 1952 after which the clergy and congregation walked in procession to St Giles’ Cathedral with the communion cups of 1633, baptismal basin and laver of 1682. The congregation merged with the Tron Kirk, Moredun.

=== Archaeological excavations ===
In 1974 archaeological excavations took place under the church which revealed foundations of 16th-century buildings from a long-vanished close, Marlins Wynd, named after a stonemason Walter Merlioun who lived there in 1500. This was retained as a piece of publicly visible urban archaeology until the building was refloored in 2004. The public could view the remnants of the basements, the paved closes, and drainage channels in a Pompeii style, viewing from a walkway around the inner perimeter.

=== Post religious history ===
In September 1953 the Town Council agreed to purchase the Tronk Kirk from the Church of Scotland for £12,500 (equivalent to £303,200 in 2025) and intended to adapt the building for civic purposes at a further cost of £9,250 However the deal was not agreed.

In 1960 against the bid of £12,500 from the Corporation, Tronsite Ltd put up £15,000, took over the church and intended to demolish it to erect a new shop and office block on the site, but the Corporation put a Preservation Order on the building, so it was put up for sale in 1962. The church was subsequently left to decay, and the interiors were eventually gutted.

In 1969 it was acquired by the Corporation for the sum of £25,000. The corporation decided that they would invest £28,000 converting the building into a civic display centre. In addition repairs to the tower and spire costing £15,000 were also needed. The main contract for work was placed in June 1974 and work started in September. However escalating costs led to much of the proposed project being abandoned. The building finally opened to the public in June 1987.

=== Edinburgh World Heritage at the Tron ===
Between 2018 and early 2020, the Tron Kirk hosted an exhibition which showcased the Edinburgh Old and New Towns UNESCO World Heritage Site, as well as Scotland’s five other World Heritage Sites.

The exhibition aimed to capture the essence of the World Heritage Site in Edinburgh through the voices and opinions of local people. The story was told in a series of videos, quotes, and specially commissioned portraits from the Scottish photographer Alicia Bruce.

In Summer 2019, two retail outlets opened within the exhibition: John Kay's Shop (a gift shop specialising in Scottish gifts and books, historic prints and maps), and the Scottish Textiles Showcase.

=== Scottish Historic Buildings Trust ===
In May 2021, the City of Edinburgh Council and the Scottish Historic Buildings Trust (SHBT) announced plans to restore the building and give it "a new and meaningful lease of life". The SHBT is to conduct a feasibility study. Once funding has been secured, the SHBT will be granted a 125-year lease on the building.

In June 2022, the SHBT announced that, from 1 July 2022, the building would be used on a short-term basis as a retail outlet by a social enterprise, Scottish Design Exchange.

=== Edinburgh Festival Fringe ===
The Tron is also used as a venue during the Edinburgh Festival Fringe, when it has been operated by Just The Tonic and Freestival as a music, comedy and cabaret venue and cafe.

== Ministers ==
=== First Charge ===
- 1641 to 1649 - William Colvill (d.1675) who had translated from Trinity College Church a quarter mile to the north-east
- 1648 to 1662 - Robert Laurie also translated from Trinity College Church
- 1663 to 1672 - John Paterson
- 1672 to 1675 - William Annan
- 1675 to 1680 - James Lundie, translated to Dalkeith in 1680
- 1681 - Robert Bruce, dismissed after a few months for refusing to take the Solemn Oath
- 1683 to 1687 - George Trotter (d.1687)
- 1687 to 1691 - Alexander Malcolm, went to England following a dispute and failed to return
- 1687 to 1692 - William Erskine
- 1695 to 1707 - William Crichton twice Moderator 1692 and 1697
- 1707 to 1729 - William Wishart (d.1729) five times Moderator
- 1730 to 1785 - George Wishart, son of preceding, Moderator in 1748, the church's longest serving minister
- 1786 to 1809 - Andrew Hunter of Barjarg (1743-1809) moderator in 1792
- 1809 to 1845 - Alexander Brunton moderator in 1823
- 1845 to 1867 - Maxwell Nicholson
- 1868 to 1873 - James MacGregor
- 1874 to 1875 - John Barclay
- 1876 to 1881 - William Cruickshank Eddie Jamieson (1839-1881)
- 1881 to 1885 - John Methven Robertson
- 1885 to 1911 - David Morrison (1838-1911)
- 1902 to 1907 - Dugald Butler
- 1908 to 1916 - John Wallace (afterwards minister of the Second Charge at Paisley Abbey)
- 1916 to 1918 - A M. Snadden (temporary).
- 1926 to 1940 - J. Ford McLeod
- 1941 to 1949 - F.A. Simpson

=== Second Charge ===
The church and congregation were of a scale which required a "second charge" for additional services:

- 1650 to 1655 - John Stirling translated to the newly built Lady Yester's Church
- 1663 to 1665 - James Lundie MA
- 1665 to 1676 - Robert Mortimer
- 1677 to 1682 - John Farquhar
- 1682 to 1683 - George Trotter moved to first charge (see above)
- 1683 to 1689 - John Strachan (d.1699)
- 1691 to 1709 - George Meldrum, twice Moderator 1698 and 1703, the first Second Charge to become Moderator
- 1710 to 1713 - John Steedman
- 1715 to 1741 - Matthew Wood
- 1745 to 1753 - William Wishart, Principal of Edinburgh University, Moderator in 1745
- 1754 to 1766 - John Jardine (1715-1766)
- 1767 to 1788 - John Drysdale (1718-1788) twice Moderator in 1773 and 1784
- 1789 to 1831 - William Simpson (1744-1831), 42 years service with Tron
- 1832 to 1860 - John Hunter (1788-1866) son of Andrew Hunter first charge (see above) declined post of Moderator

The second charge at Tron was abolished in 1860 due to the Annuity Tax Act.

== Notable events ==
The memoirist Elisabeth West worshipped here when William Erskine was the minister and he died in May 1692. Erskine's replacement was George Meldrum and he advised her to keep a record and her diary is an insight into the Tron's history.

In 1697, Thomas Aikenhead, an 18-year-old student, became the last person in Scotland to be executed for the crime of blasphemy after a fellow student reported that he had blasphemed against God outside the Tron Kirk. Aikenhead was prosecuted for saying "I wish I were in that place Ezra calls hell so I could warm myself" as he walked by the kirk on his way back from a night of drinking with some classmates.

The baptisms and marriages of many Edinburgh luminaries took place in the Tron, one being the marriage of the famous jurist John Lauder, Lord Fountainhall on 21 January 1669, to Janet (1652–1686), daughter of Sir Andrew Ramsay, Lord Abbotshall, 1st Baronet, and the first Lord Provost of Edinburgh, and a Senator of the College of Justice (d.1688).

On 25 April 1694 Helen (d. 9 January 1714), daughter of George Ogilvy, 2nd Lord Banff (d.1668) by his spouse Agnes, daughter of Alexander 1st Lord Falconer, of Halkerstoun, married Sir Robert Lauder of Beilmouth in the Tron.

Rev John Drysdale, who married Mary Adam, daughter of the famous architect William Adam, was a Minister of the Tron Kirk from 1766 to 1788 and was also twice Moderator of the General Assembly of the Church of Scotland, though now he is chiefly remembered for his friendship with Adam Smith, the economist.

The General Assembly of the Church of Scotland met in the Tron from 1830 to 1840—the period of the "Ten Years' Conflict".

== Clock ==
The first clock was installed in 1658. It had originally been in the Weigh House at the head of West Bow. This clock was lost in the fire of 1824. A new clock by James Clark of Edinburgh was obtained to replace it. It is an eight day clock installed in 1828.

== Hogmanay ==
Traditionally the Tron was a place of gathering to celebrate New Year, mainly because of its chiming clock, high on the spire, and visible (and audible) over a wide area.

The Tron's position as the traditional focus of Edinburgh's Hogmanay celebrations has been greatly diminished in recent years, due to the expansion of the City Council's organised Hogmanay Street Party in the city centre.

However, it was announced in November 2012 that this historic venue would re-stake its claim to the city's hogmanay celebrations, with a Festival of the Extraordinary planned to include live music, film screenings and, amongst other things, a mixology masterclass.
