= George Meldrum =

Scottish minister

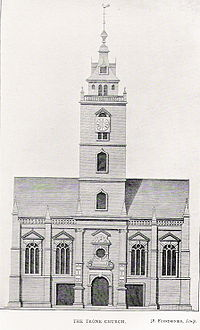
Tron Kirk as it appeared in 1700

George Meldrum (1634–1709) was a Scottish minister of the Church of Scotland who twice served as Moderator of the General Assembly, the highest position in the Scottish Church. He was one of the prominent Scottish Covenanters.

== Life ==
He was born in Aberdeen in 1634 the fourth son of Andrew Meldrum, a dyer and town baillie. He studied at Marischal College in Aberdeen and gained an MA in 1651. In 1653 he was elected Regent of the college (aged only 19!). In 1659 he was ordained as a minister in the Church of Scotland as second charge to the main church in Aberdeen. During these troubled times he was deprived of office in 1662 but restored in 1663. In 1663 he became Rector of Marischal College but lost that office in 1681 for refusing to sign the Test of Allegiance.

In 1688 he began to minister at Kilwinning. In 1691 he moved to second charge of Tron Kirk in Edinburgh one of Scotland's most important charges.

In 1698 he was elected Moderator of the General Assembly the highest position in the Church of Scotland despite only being second charge under Rev William Crichton. However, Crichton was unlikely to be disturbed by this as he had already twice served as Moderator.He was the first second charge to become Moderator, but not the only one, the feat being repeated by both James Grierson and George Logan.

In 1701 he was created Professor of Divinity at Edinburgh University in place of George Campbell.

In 1703 he became Moderator for the second time. During his leadership the Commissioner, Viscount Seafield abruptly dissolved the meeting without warning. This led to discussions regarding political power within these religious assemblies.

He died in Edinburgh on 18 February 1709.

== Congregation ==
Meldrum is said to have been the principal inspiration to Edinburgh servant Elisabeth West in pushing her to self-improvement: She saw him as the "Lord's Messenger". She went on the run the Trades Maiden Hospital a.k.a. the Mary Erskine School (school for merchants daughters in Edinburgh) from 1708.

== Publications ==
- The Danger of Popery Discovered (1714 - posthumous)
