= Thomas Peebles (glazier) =

Scottish glazier

Thomas Peebles or Peblis was a Scottish glazier who worked for James IV, Margaret Tudor, and James V of Scotland.

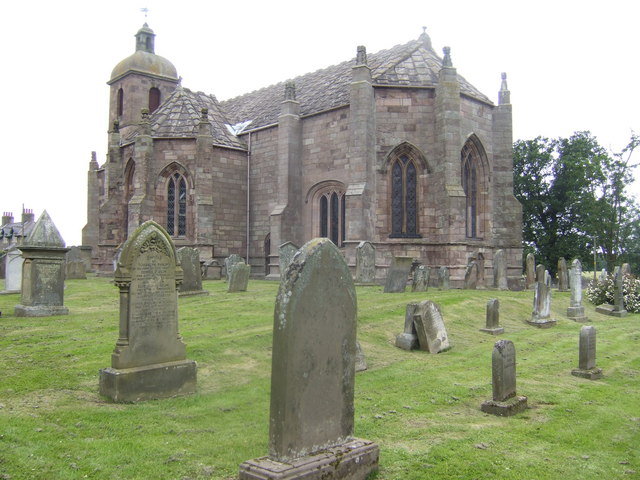
Thomas Peebles made the windows for the church at Ladykirk, a project of James IV

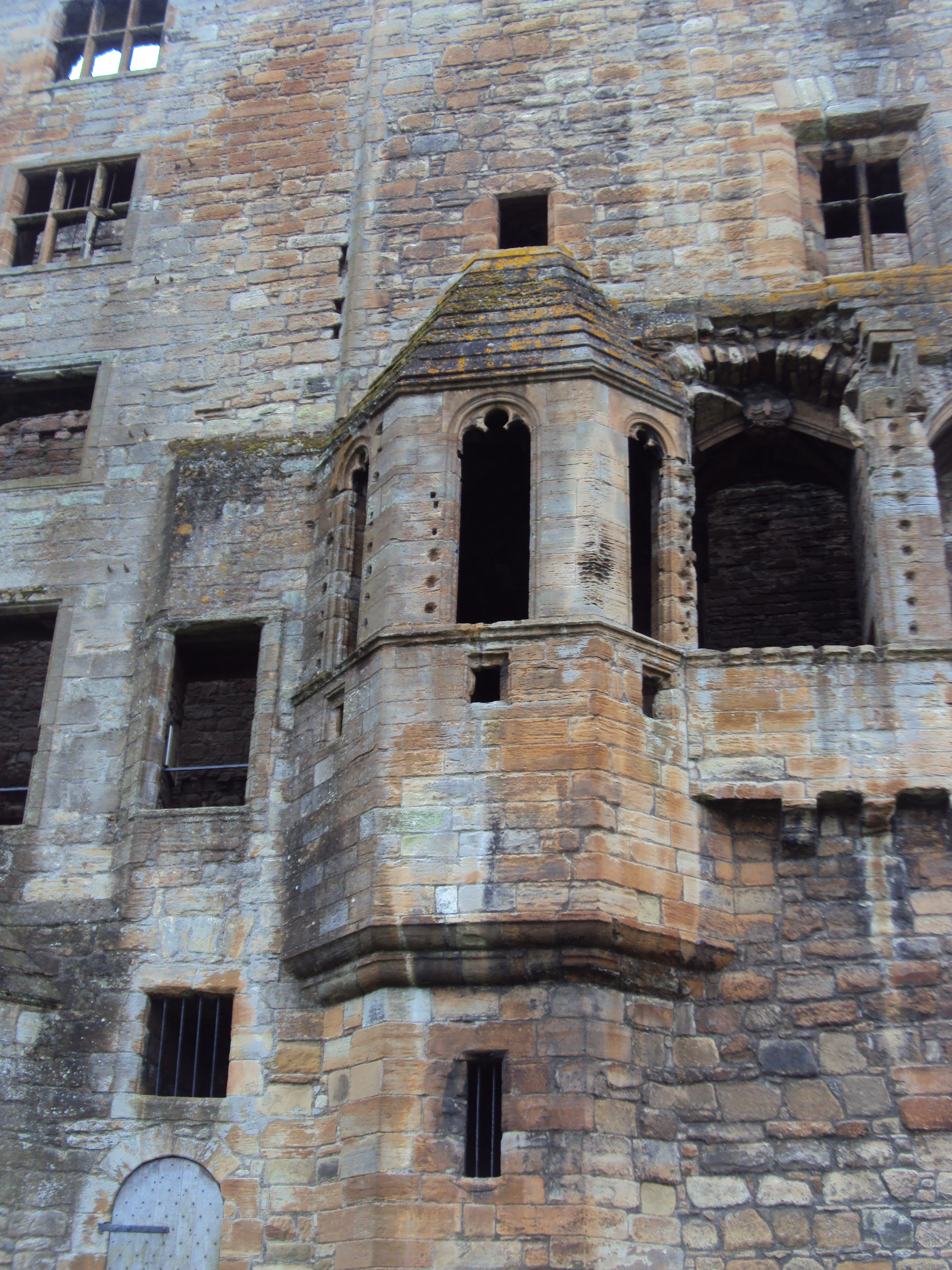
Thomas Peebles reglazed an oratory for Margaret Tudor at Linlithgow Palace in 1513

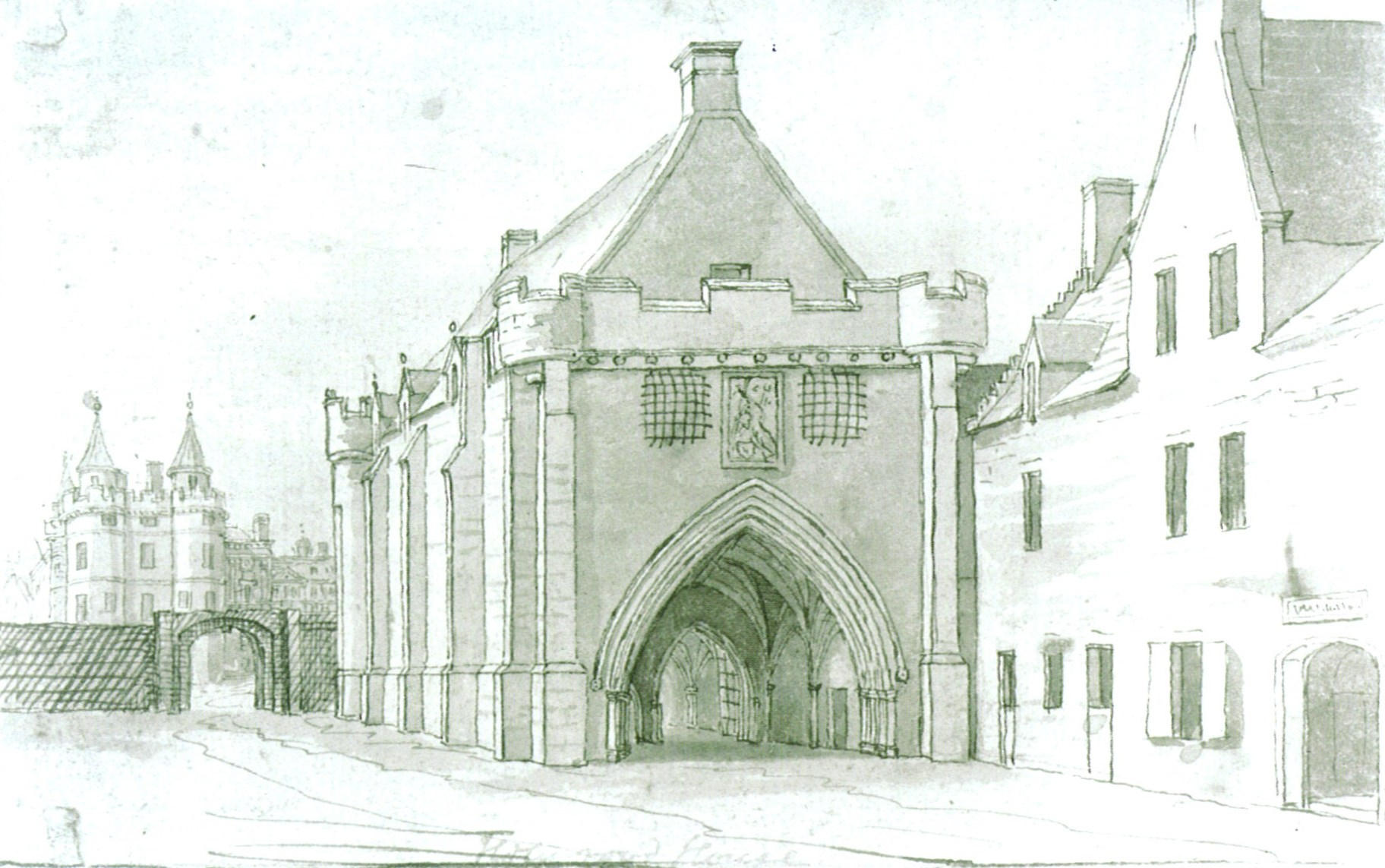
Thomas Peebles worked in the gatehouse at Holyrood Palace until was it was converted into a tapestry workshop in 1537

The old Scottish word for a glazier was a "glassin wright". In Edinburgh, craftsmen joined an incorporation of wrights and masons and other related trades. The glaziers were classed with painters in the craft hierarchy. Thomas Peebles, who worked mostly for the king, had a workshop in a "great house" at Holyrood Palace. He received an annual fee from the royal treasurer and comptroller for maintaining the windows of the royal palaces in addition to payment for his work. He also received livery clothes.

== Career ==
Thomas Peebles constructed windows, possibly from panes and lozenges of imported glass, with cames of lead. He made a great glass lantern for Holyroodhouse in 1513. He travelled to measure and fit windows at the various residences. The Scottish court was peripatetic, but there is no suggestion in the records that windows were routinely carried between residences as tapestries were. Peebles measured up windows at the Ladykirk or Kirk o'Steill in 1504 and was paid for carrying glass to the church and installing it in 1507. In 1511 he made windows for the "Palace of Stirling", probably the surviving royal lodging now known as the King's Old Building.

In April 1512 Peebles fixed some of the windows of Linlithgow Palace with sail cloth from Brittany as part of the preparations for Easter. He also supplied "glassbands" and clamps for windows around the palace, and reglazed the Great Hall. Some of this work was likely in connection with the confinement of Margaret Tudor at the palace, James V was born on 10 April. In September 1512 he glazed her oratory at Holyroodhouse with "painted rounds with chaplets", and in 1513 Peebles was paid for re-glazing the oratory of the queen's chamber at Linlithgow, thought to be an oriel window that overlooks Linlithgow loch. The queen's wardrobe servant James Dog gave him the payment for glazing the oratory at Linlithgow.

He supplied glass for the new tower at Holyroodhouse in 1532. Prestigious rooms included "painted work, rounds, square pieces with chaplets together with arms and borders". The windows of the first floor suite above the vaults included the King's arms. Seven "rounds", possibly Flemish stained glass roundels, were supplied by a merchant, William Anderson.

At Linlithgow Palace in 1535, he supplied glass for the chapel windows and the windows of the great hall. The building account, kept by James Hamilton of Finnart and the chaplain Thomas Johnson, calls the Great Hall the "Lion Chamber". The five chapel windows included "five images" of "painted work" and "white glass". Finnart and Johnson gave him an advance of £20 Scots for further work. The bills distinguish between painted glass and white glass, the painted glass was 6 shillings per foot, and the white glass 16 pence.

He was given a further royal pension of 20 merks in 1537 for giving up his house or workshop at Holyrood in the upper chamber over the vaulted pend of the abbey gate house. The remains of this building, constructed by the mason Walter Merlioun in 1502, can be seen today at Abbey Strand. The workshop space was refitted for mending the royal tapestry.

In 1540 he made a number of windows for Falkland Palace, for the north wardrobe, the bake house, chambers above the bake house, the porter's lodge, the new chapel, the vaults under the chapel, the brewhouse, and the west cellar. This project included a quantity of old glass set in new lead work. At Holyrood, Peebles removed old windows from the fore entry gatehouse and remade them for the Great Hall.

After James V died, Peebles repaired windows at the royal palaces of Stirling and Falkland for his widow, Mary of Guise, in 1543.

Peebles's wife supplied fodder to the cart horses of the royal works. The name of his wife, and the date of his death are unknown.

== Heraldic glass in Scotland ==
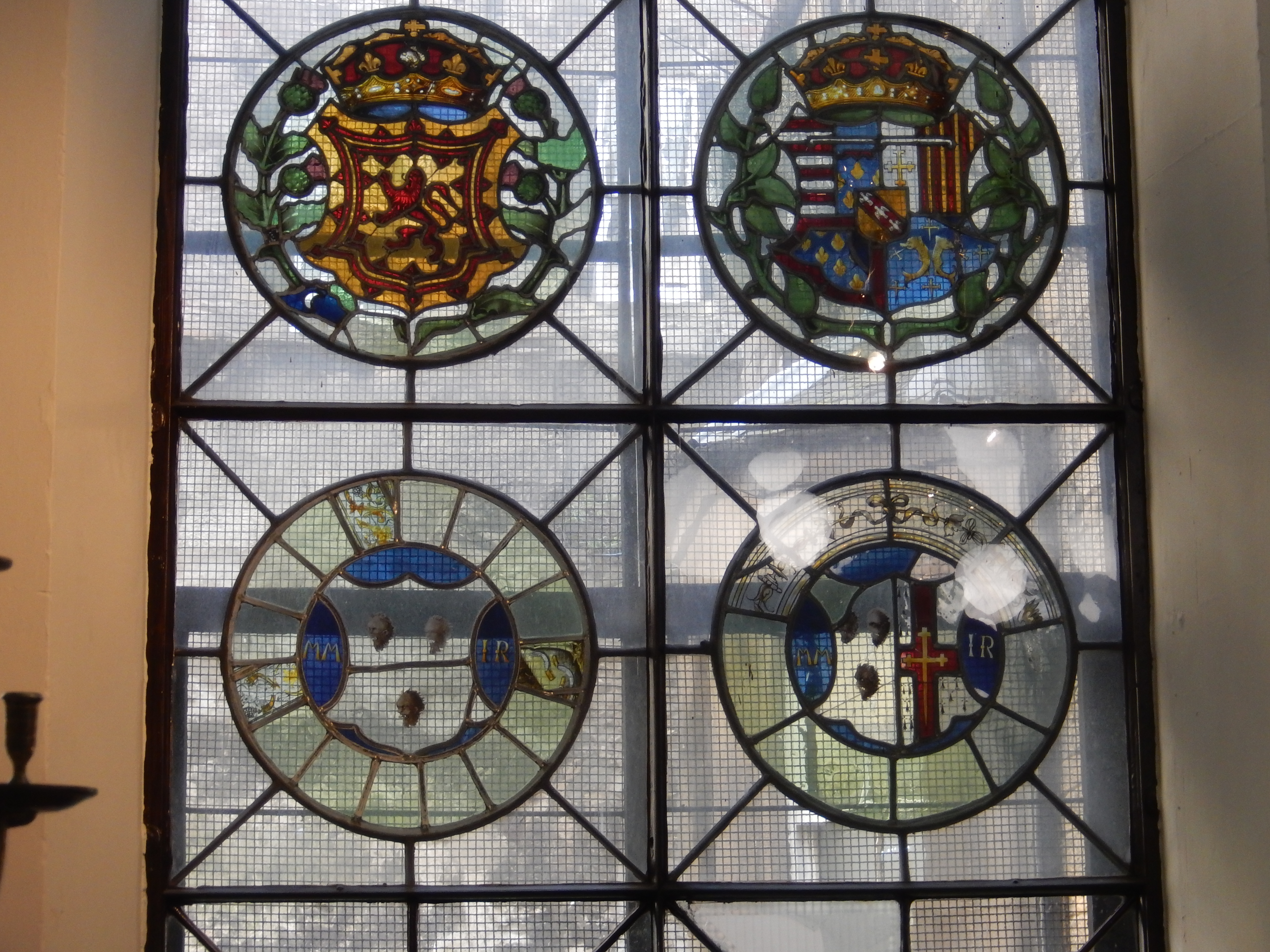
Stained glass heraldic roundels at the Magdalen Chapel commemorating Michael MacQueen and Janet Rhynd

In January 1540, Robert Binning glazed David's Tower and the chapel in Edinburgh Castle. In August 1550 Walter Binning, a painter and glazier, supplied glass to Regent Arran for Hamilton Palace that was "kelyeit" or marked with his coat of arms. It is not clear if Binning painted the Regent's arms on this glass himself or if it was imported.

It seems likely that heraldic glass was supplied to the nobility of Scotland to decorate their houses and castles in the 16th century. The Complaynt of Scotland, a poem written in 1549 during the war of the Rough Wooing, mentions heraldry used in seals, signet rings, painted on walls, and "in your glasyn windowis". A significant survival can be seen at the Magdalen Chapel in Edinburgh's Cowgate, where a window displays the badges of Mary of Guise and the founders Michael MacQueen and his wife Jonet Rhynd.

An earlier reference to stained glass in Scotland was rediscovered by an art historian Margaret Haines working in the archives of Florence Cathedral. Two letters concern an Italian stained glass artist Francesco Domenico di Livi da Gambassi, known as Francesco Livi, who had travelled to Scotland to work for James I of Scotland in the 1430s. He may have been employed at the Charterhouse of Perth.
