= Walter Merlioun =

Scottish master mason

Walter Merlioun, was a Scottish master mason based in Edinburgh.

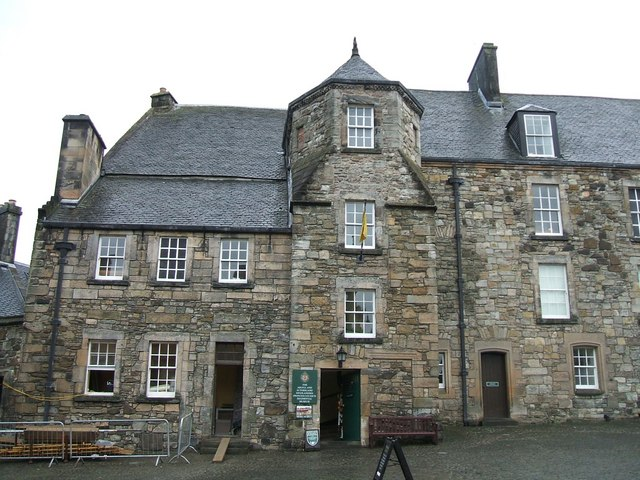
The Merlioun family built the "King's House" at Stirling Castle for James IV

== Working for James IV ==
Merlioun worked on a number of buildings in Scotland including castles and churches for James IV of Scotland. Henry Merlioun, who built Ravenscraig Castle for Mary of Gueldres was probably his father. The family had a property in Edinburgh on the south side of the High Street, which gave their name to a close, "Merlin's Wynd" or '"Marlin's Wynd". The remains of this paved street are under the floor of the Tron Kirk.

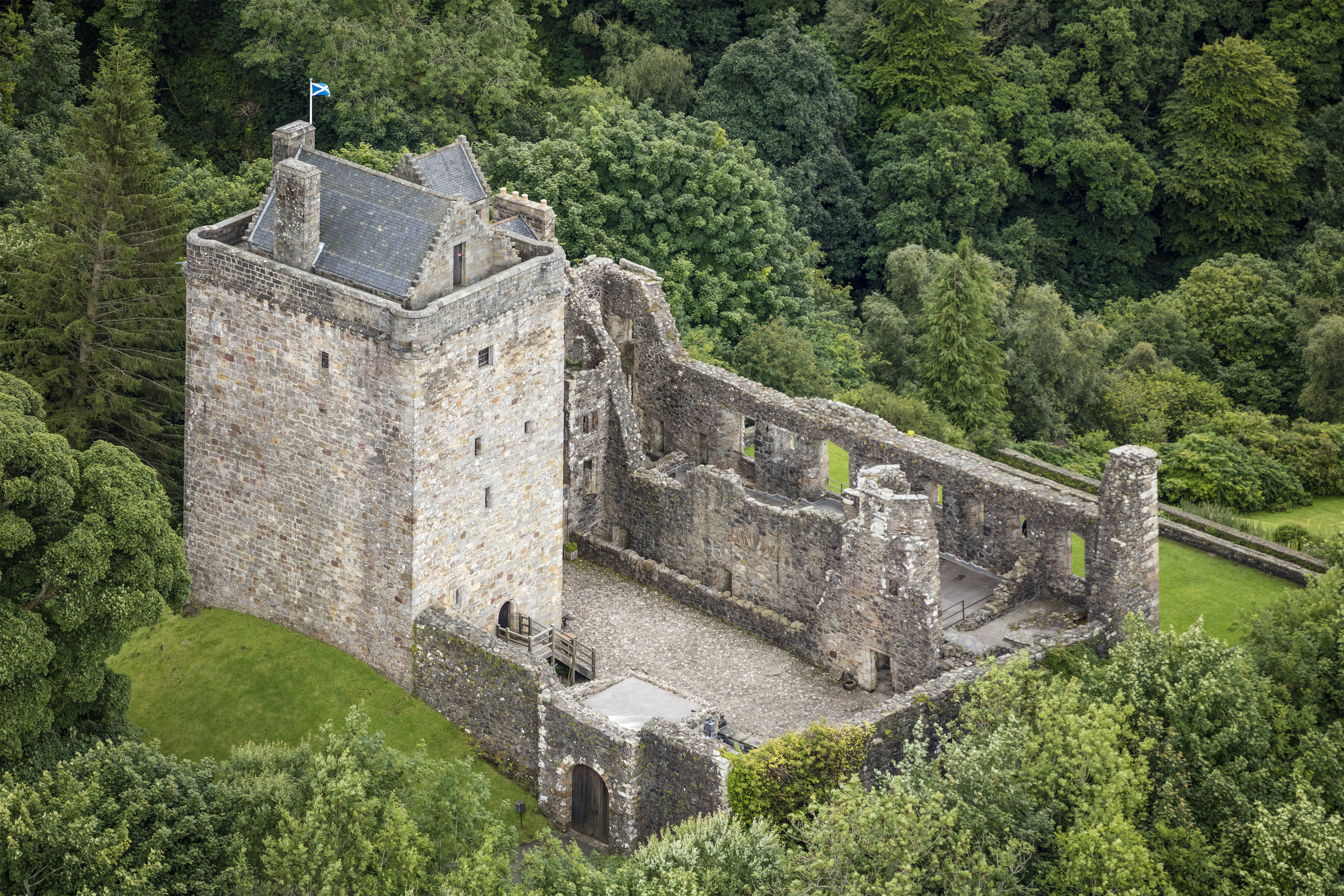
A turret at Castle Campbell resembles documented work of the Merlioun brothers at Stirling

Walter and his brother John Merlioun are recorded as the builders of the lodging or king's house at Stirling Castle, now known as the "King's Old Building". The work commenced in June 1496. A large amount of timber was bought and shipped from Leith. The overall supervisor of building at Stirling was a priest, Thomas Smyth, and after 1497, Andrew Aytoun, captain of the castle. Advice on the building was taken from the master master of Linlithgow, who visited and gave his "device". Andrew Sclatare, who was a slater, was working on the roof in November 1496, and the Merlioun brothers had a final payment for the "hous bigging", building the house in January 1497. The lodging was damaged by a fire in 1855, and rebuilt to designs by Robert Billings, but some original masonry survives. The original entrance stair in a hexagonal pepperpot turret resembles the great hall at Castle Campbell.

Walter Merlioun worked on the church of St John at Perth in 1496.

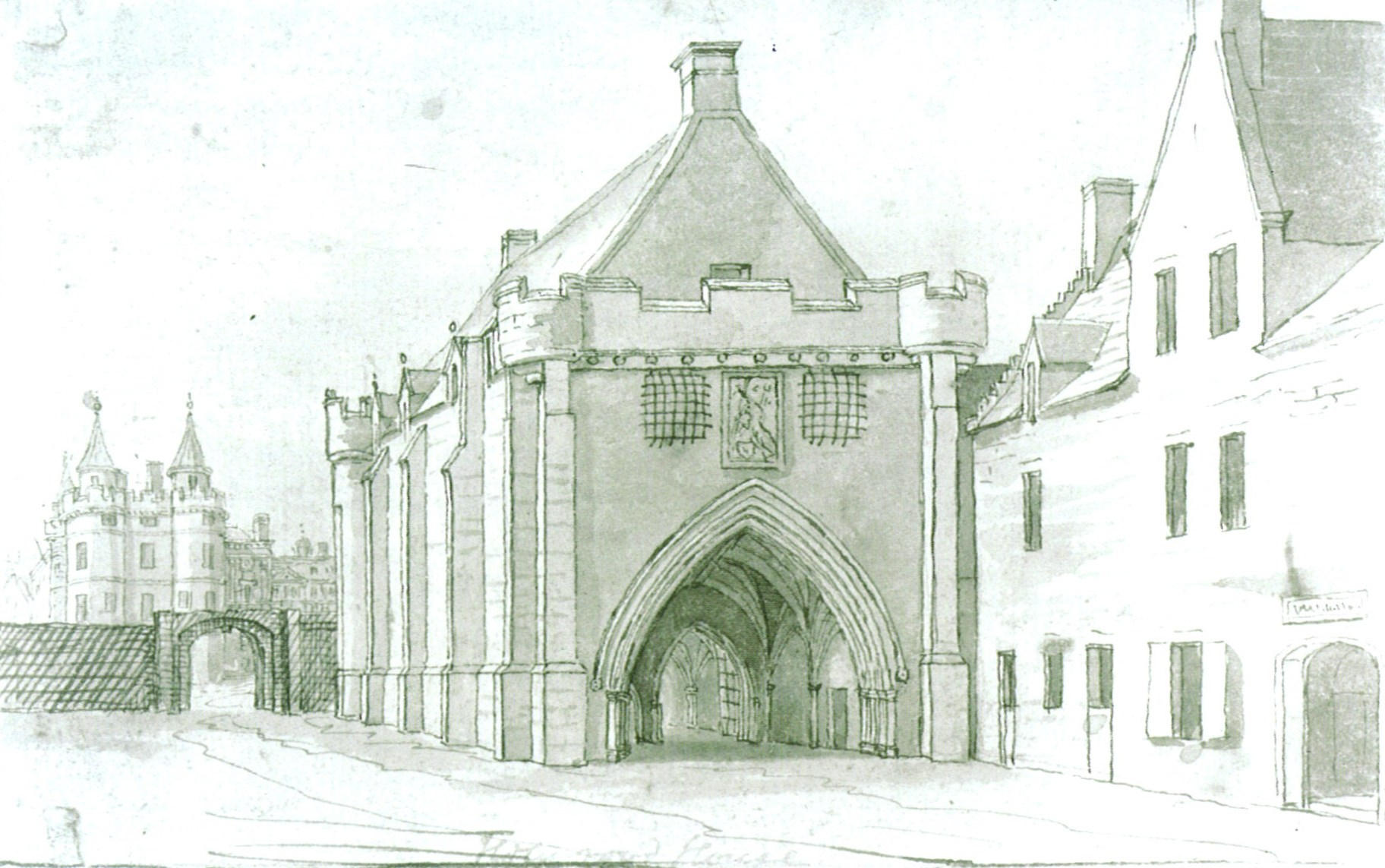
Merlioun's gatehouse for Holyrood Palace, sketch by Thomas Sandby

In April 1497 he was at Dunbar Castle and was paid £10 Scots as an installment for his work on the gatehouse or "fore work". In June he completed the "pending", perhaps the vaulting, of the hall at Dunbar, and the masonry of the "Hannis tower", which was roofed by William Young and Tom Mackachane.

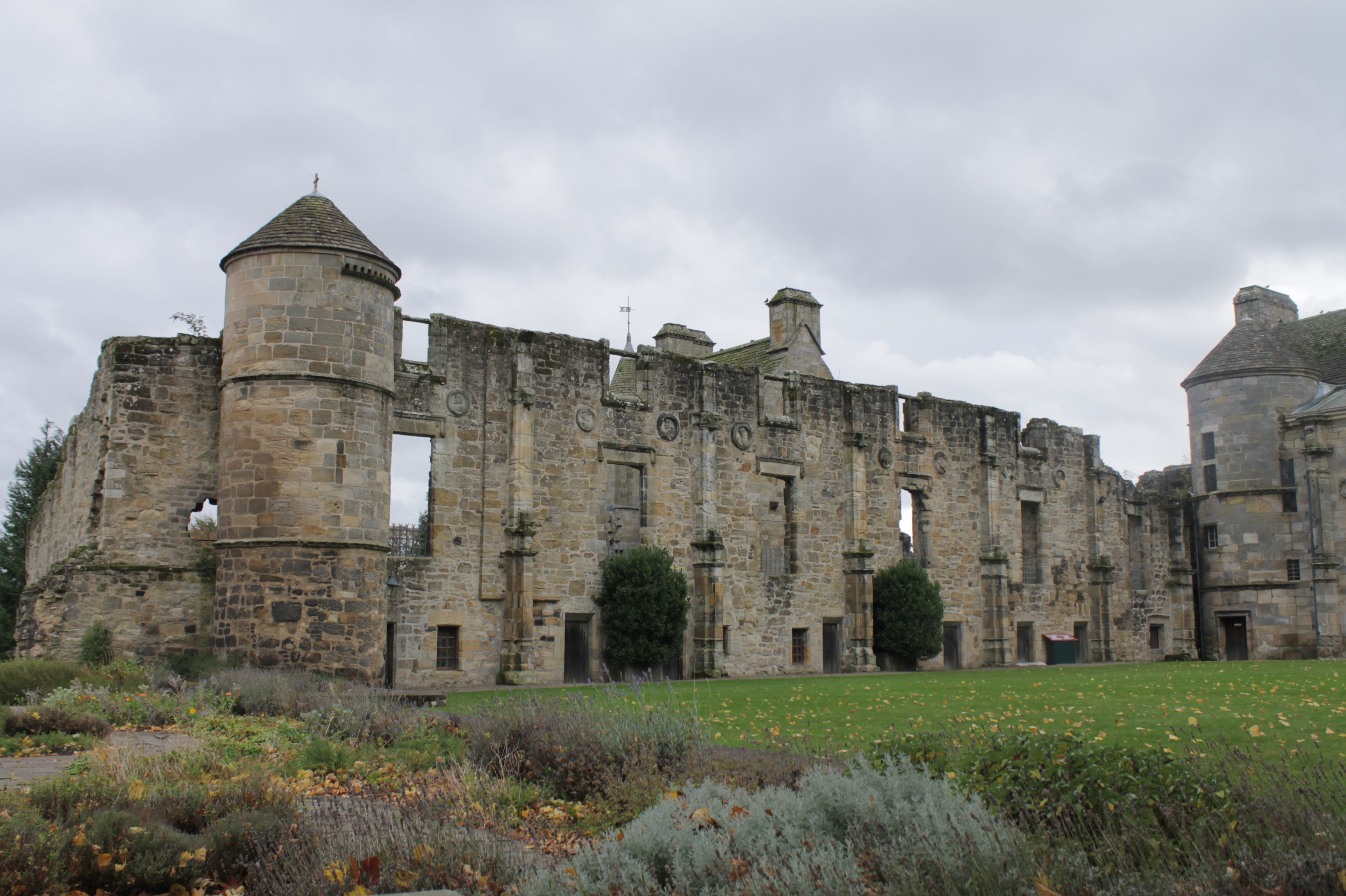
John Merlioun reconfigured the East Quarter of Falkland Palace in 1538

Walter Merlioun was granted a pension for life of £40 in June 1499. In 1500 he was working at Holyrood Palace.

In 1501 John Merlioun and two workmen were sent north to Darnaway Castle where the famous hall had recently been repaired, and James IV set up a household for his mistress Janet Kennedy.

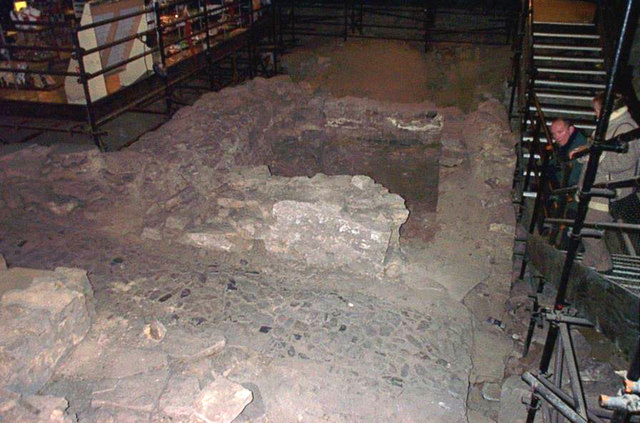
Archaeological excavations at Marlin's wynd displayed at the Tron Kirk in 2002

In October 1502 Walter Merlioun began work on a new chapel and "foirwerk" at Holyrood Palace. He was given a symbolic payment of 14 shillings called "God's penny". The fore work was a vaulted passageway serving as the entrance to the palace yard, and its remains can still be at Abbey Strand at the gate of the palace. The glazier Thomas Peebles worked in the upper floor of this building until 1537. In November 1505 Merlioun was paid 200 merks for his part of building a new tower at Holyrood Palace.

Walter Merlioun was said to have paved Edinburgh's High Street. He became a semi-legendary figure in Edinburgh history, conflated with later stories, and said to have been a Frenchman. An arrangement of stones near the site of his house at Merlin's or Marlin's wynd was said to represent his coffin, visible before the area was cleared in 1785 for the building of South Bridge. Marlin's wynd is the close or street revealed by archaeologists under the floor of the Tron Kirk in 1974.

Walter Merlioun was dead by 1521 and his widow Margaret Robisoun sold her property situated in the tenenment of the late Robert Lauder in 1527. Properties records indicate the building was damaged in May 1544 when an English army burnt Edinburgh, an action in the war known as the Rough Wooing.

== The Craft's altar in St Giles ==
On 3 March and 19 June 1506 Walter Merlioun took the king's offering of 14 shillings for the light or lamp of St John's altar in St Giles' Kirk, the altar of the mason craft. On 8 May 1508 Walter Merlioun and his wife Margaret Robisoun made over a rental or income from a property on the south side of Edinburgh's High Street, situated within a tenement belonging to Robert Lauder, for the benefit of the altars of St John the Baptist and St John the Evangelist in St Giles, which were maintained by the Edinburgh Craft of Masons and Wrights.

== Reign of James V ==
Walter and John Merlioun, of the next generation, probably their namesake sons, were involved in building work at Falkland Palace and Holyrood Palace for James V in the 1530s.

In 1538 "Johne Merilyone" was paid for significant works at Falkland, on the now ruined quarter "East Quarter". This was the conversion and extension of an older building. He inserted chimneys, and new dividing walls, and built vaults. The refurbishment included seven chambers, the royal wardrobe and the kitchens, with the food "dressory" and cup house. The new spaces were cleaned by the "barrow men" and site labourers and the seven chambers were lime plastered by John Malcolm alias Callum, whose craft was known as "perjoning".

John Merlioun was also paid for building a new Register House in Edinburgh Castle to house the Scottish exchequer archives in 1540.
