= James Lundie (minister) =

James Lundie (c. 1637–1696) was a Church of Scotland minister who held several charges in Edinburgh.

== Life ==
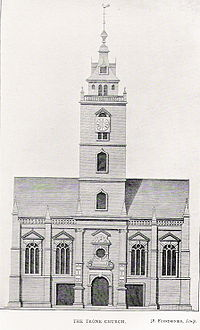
Engraving of the kirk as it looked before 1785

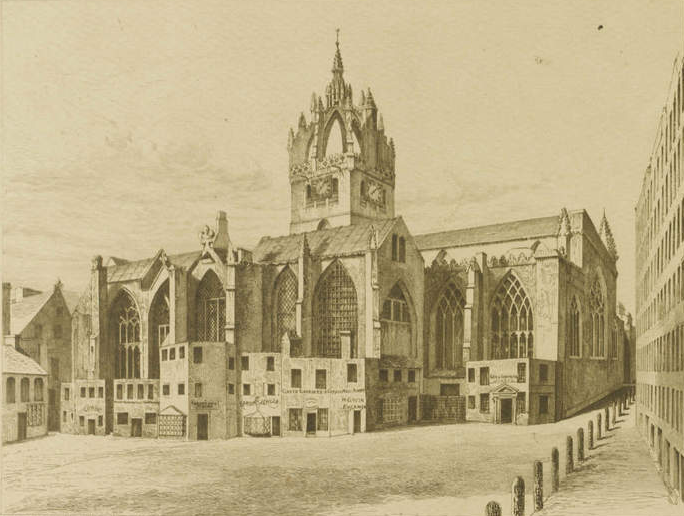
St Giles Cathedral c.1700

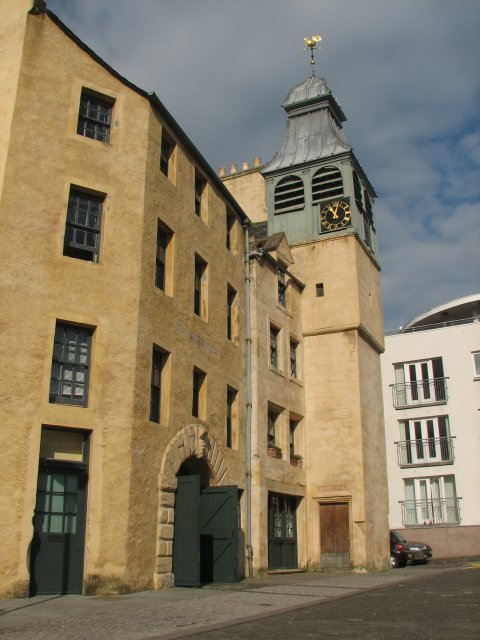
St Ninian's Manse incorporates the tower of the 17th-century former parish church

He graduated MA from King's College, Aberdeen in 1657. In April 1663 he moved to second charge of Tron Kirk on the Royal Mile in Edinburgh. In May 1665 he replaced Rev David Dickson as second charge of High Kirk of St Giles 100m west of the Tron. In 1672 he moved to Tolbooth Parish (at that time also within St Giles as one of the four divisions contained within. In 1675 he moved to first charge of the Tron Kirk, translating to Dalkeith in 1680.

In September 1687 he was chosen (by the congregation) as minister of North Leith Parish Church in the harbour area of Edinburgh in place of Rev James Hutcheson.

He died in North Leith manse on 31 March 1696.

== Family ==
In March 1671 he married Catherine Chrystie, daughter of James Chrystie and Jean Primrose. Their children included:

- James Lundie (b. 1672)
- Rev Archibald Lundie (1674-1759) minister of Saltoun
- Margaret (b. 1675)
- Jean (b. 1676)
- John (b. 1677)
- Andrew and Janet (b. 1679)

In 1685 he married Agnes Wilkie, daughter of James Wilkie of Caramo and widow of Henry Morison WS and had one further son, James (b. 1686).

== Publications ==
Not known
