= George Wishart (moderator) =

Scottish clergyman (1703–1785)

George Wishart (1703–1785) was a Scottish minister who was Moderator of the General Assembly of the Church of Scotland in 1748. He was also Chaplain-in-Ordinary to the King of England and Dean of the Chapel Royal.

== Life ==
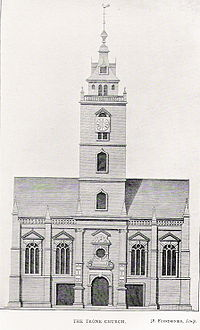
The Tron Kirk as it was in Wishart's day

Wishart was born in Edinburgh's Old Town in 1703, the son of Janet Murray (died 1744), daughter of Janet Nisbet and Major William Murray of Touchadam, and the Very Rev Prof William Wishart, the Principal of the University of Edinburgh and minister of the Tron Kirk on the Royal Mile. His father in turn had been Rev William Wishart (1621–1692), minister of Kinneil, the grandson of Sir John Wishart (1570-1607) and Jean (Douglas) Wishart, the daughter of William Douglas, 9th Earl of Angus and his wife, Agnes Keith, daughter of William Keith, 3rd Earl Marischal. His uncles included Admiral Sir James Wishart and Sir George Wishart 1st baronet of Cliftonhall. His brother William Wishart (secundus), like his father, also became the Principal of the University of Edinburgh.

He studied divinity at the University of Edinburgh, graduating with an MA in 1719, while his father was Principal of the University. He was licensed by the Edinburgh Presbytery of the Church of Scotland in 1726 and was ordained at St Cuthbert's Church, Edinburgh in parallel to Rev Neil McVicar who ran the collegiate function of the church. Wishart took over at his father's church at the Tron in 1730. He became Principal Clerk to the General Assembly in 1746 and was elected Moderator in 1748. His service at the Tron Kirk was continuous from 1730 until death – 55 years; the longest-serving minister in that church.

In 1759 Edinburgh University awarded him an honorary Doctor of Divinity (DD). He was appointed Dean of the Chapel Royal in 1765.

He died at his home on Shoemakers Close on the Royal Mile on 12 June 1785. He is buried in Greyfriars Kirkyard in Edinburgh. He was succeeded in his post of minister of the Tron by Rev Andrew Hunter of Barjarg.

== Family ==
In December 1727 he married Ann Campbell, daughter of John Campbell of Orchard, (a grandson of both Sir James Campbell and of Sir Robert Campbell, grandson of Robert Sempill, 3rd Lord Sempill and John Stewart, 4th Earl of Atholl).

Their daughter Jane ("Jeanie") Wishart (1742–1811) married Baron von Westphalen and was grandmother of Jenny von Westphalen, later the wife of Karl Marx), four other daughters, and one son.

Their daughter Janet married Major General John Beckwith.

== Publications ==
- A pamphlet seeking Justice to be brought on the murderers of Cpt John Porteous (1737)
