= Robert Hamilton (economist) =

Scottish mathematician and political economist

Robert Hamilton FRSE
- Born: 11 June 1743
- Died: 14 July 1829 (aged 86)
- Education: University of Edinburgh
- Known for: founding member of the Royal Society of Edinburgh
- Scientific career
- Fields: mathematics; political economy

Robert Hamilton FRSE (11 June 1743, Edinburgh – 14 July 1829) was a Scottish mathematician and political economist. He was a founder member of the Royal Society of Edinburgh.

== Life ==
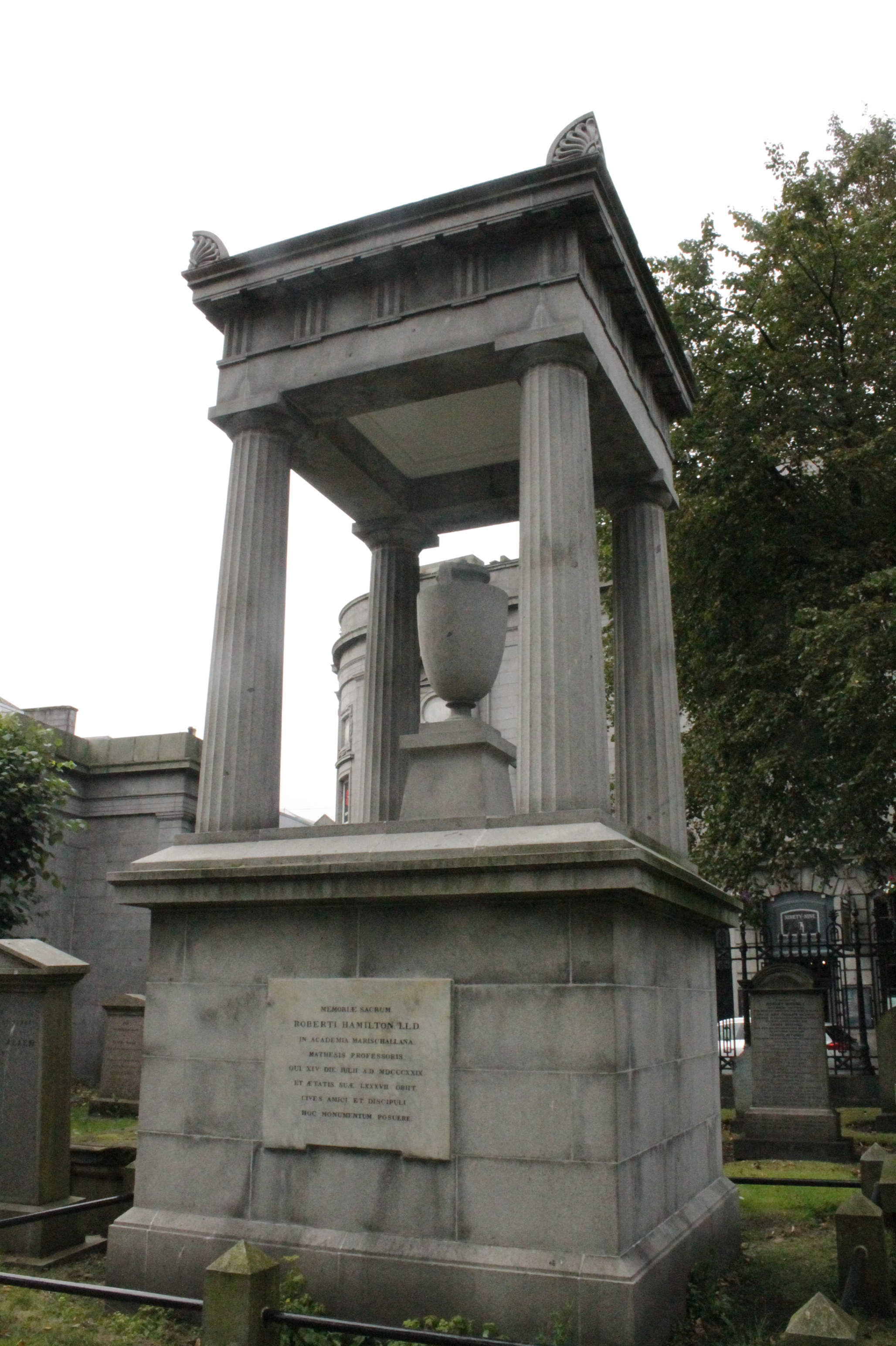
The grave of Prof Robert Hamilton, St Nicholas Churchyard, Aberdeen

He was born in Edinburgh on 11 June 1743. He was the eighth son of Gavin Hamilton, a bookseller and publisher.

His grandfather, William Hamilton, was Professor of Divinity and had also been a Principal of Edinburgh University. His paternal uncle was the Very Rev Prof Robert Hamilton (1707–87), and he was the cousin of James Hamilton (1749-1835).

Having completed his education at the High School, Edinburgh, and the University of Edinburgh, where he was distinguished in mathematics, Robert was induced to enter a banking-house in order to acquire a practical knowledge of business, but his ambition was really academic.

In 1769 he gave up business pursuits and accepted the rectorship of Perth Academy. In 1779 he was presented to the chair of natural philosophy at the University of Aberdeen. For many years, however, by private arrangement with his colleague Professor Patrick Copland, Hamilton taught the class of mathematics. In 1816 he was presented to the latter chair.

He retired in 1817 and was succeeded by Prof John Cruickshank.

In his later years he lived at 82 Broad Street in Aberdeen.

He died in 1829. He is buried in the churchyard of the Kirk of St Nicholas on Union Street in Aberdeen. His huge monument (the largest in the churchyard) lies close to the main entrance on Union Street. The grave was designed by the Aberdeen architect James Smith.

== Works ==
Hamilton's most important work is the Essay on the National Debt, which appeared in 1813 and was undoubtedly the first to expose the economic fallacies involved in Pitt's policy of a sinking fund. It is still of value. A posthumous volume published in 1830, The Progress of Society, is also of great ability, and is a very effective treatment of economical principles by tracing their origin and position in the development of social life. Some minor works of a practical character (Introduction to Merchandise, 1777; Essay on War and Peace, 1790) are now forgotten.

== Family ==
He married twice: firstly to Ann Mitchell of Ladath, and, following her death in 1778, to Jane Morison (d.1825).

His uncle was the Very Rev Prof Robert Hamilton FRSE, twice Moderator of the General Assembly of the Church of Scotland.

== Recognition ==
Hamilton Place in Aberdeen is named in his honour.

== Sources ==
- Societies
