= Church of St Mary & St Nicholas, Leatherhead =

St Mary & St Nicholas, Leatherhead
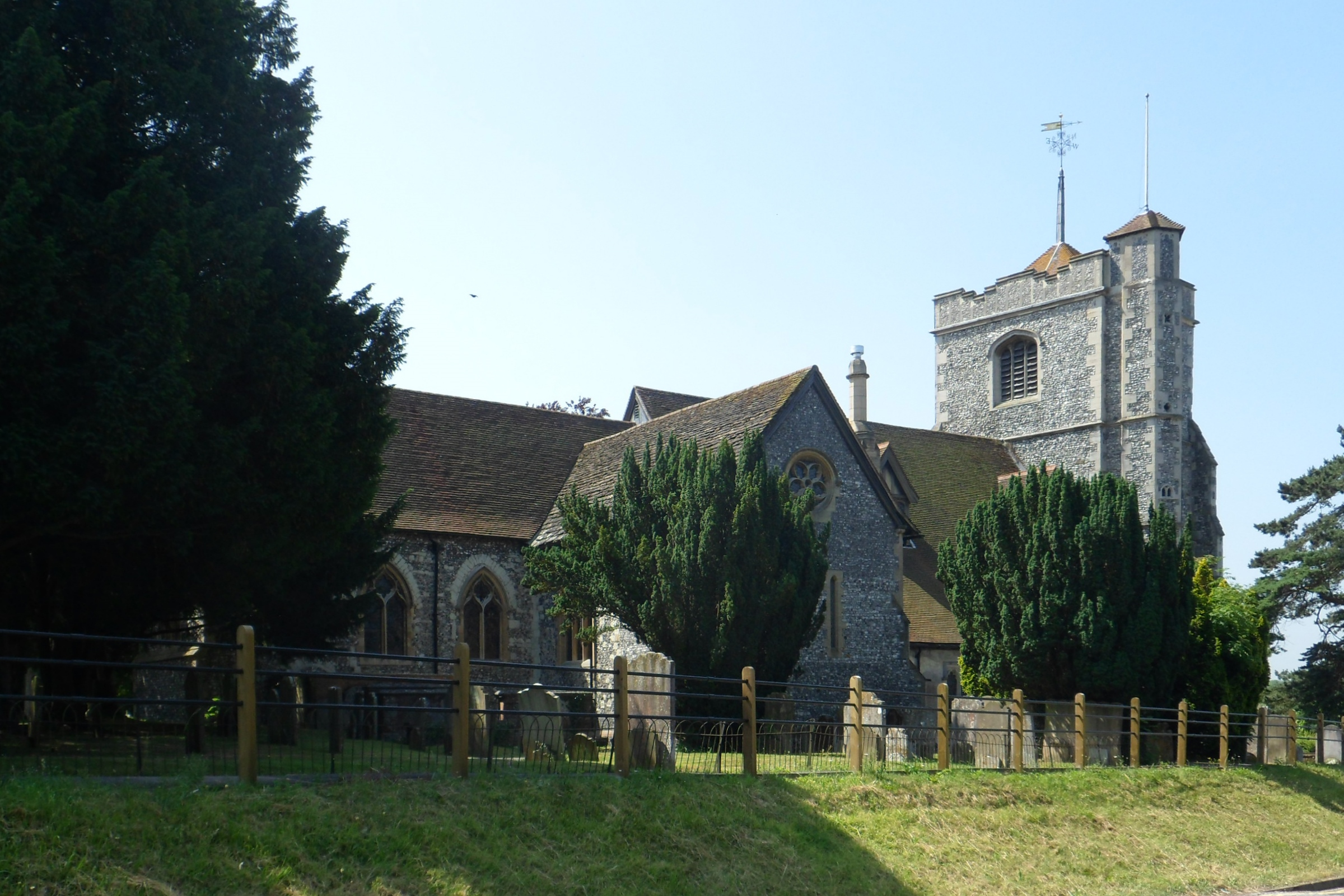
- The church seen from the north.

- 51°17′33″N 0°19′37″W
- Denomination: Church of England
- Churchmanship: Broad Church
- Website: leatherheadparish.com

History
- Dedication: Saint Mary and Saint Nicholas

Administration
- Province: Canterbury
- Diocese: Guildford
- Archdeaconry: Dorking
- Deanery: Leatherhead
- Parish: Leatherhead

Clergy
- Vicar(s): Rev Will Perry (Rector) and Rev Tom Hill (Associate Minister)

Listed Building – Grade II*
- Official name: Church of St Mary and St Nicholas
- Designated: 7 September 1951
- Reference no.: 1190429

The Church of St Mary & St Nicholas is an Anglican parish church in Leatherhead, Surrey, England. Dating originally to around the 11th century, it remains a place of worship to this day. It is a Grade II* listed building.

== Architecture ==
The body of the church mostly dates to the early 13th century (Nikolaus Pevsner dating the nave to c. 1210): the nave arcades are typical of the French late-Transitional style then sweeping south-east England. The tower was built in the late 15th century: its large-scale angle buttresses, flattened perpendicular arches and windows (with their five-part cusping) and carved spandrels above the West Door, mark it out from the rest of the building, as (with the exception of the south transept window) all other perpendicular details are small and simple, without any of the splendour of those on the tower. Many of them were heavily restored in the 19th century by Arthur Blomfield, having been plastered over in the 17th century – some of this plaster can still be seen on the south wall of the south aisle. The two frescoes of the Annunciation on either side of the chancel arch are painted by Messrs Buckeridge and Floyce. The stained glass windows in the church date back to the mid-19th century.

== Music ==
St. Mary & St. Nicholas is home to a restored English pipe organ based on 18th-century pipework. The original instrument – built by the builder Thomas Parker, one of whose instruments was said to be a favourite of Handel's – was brought from a church in Watford in 1846 and installed on the west-end gallery under the tower. In 1872, it was removed from there to the north transept as all the galleries which had filled the church were being removed. Here it was rebuilt in a new case and enlarged to three manuals by the firm of J. W. Walker of Ruislip. This instrument was overhauled twice, in 1927 and 1956, but by the time it was last heard in 1983 its state of repair was such that it had to be taken out of use. The organ remained in the north transept, and an Allen electronic imitation organ was installed. An electrical fault within the Allen started a fire in the north transept which destroyed the Allen and badly damaged the transept and the pipe organ. The J. W. Walker organ was then dismantled, leading to the discovery of the surviving Parker material, including the original keyboards. The usable 19th-century material was sold to Norway and the remainder stored, while another Allen was installed: it remains in situ. A grant in 2006 from the Heritage Lottery Fund allowed the reconstruction of the 18th-century pipe organ by the Northamptonshire firm of Goetze & Gwynn. The restored – but effectively new – instrument was installed in Leatherhead in September 2007 and is regularly used in services and for recitals. Further details will be found on the church's music website.

== Memorials ==
There is a memorial to Admiral Sir James Wishart, who died in 1723, erected by his brother William Wishart. The memorial features a good biography and models of ships. Anthony Hope, author of The Prisoner of Zenda, is buried in the graveyard.

In 1834 the discovery of the body of an unknown woman on Leatherhead Common was the origin of the folk ballad "Poor Murdered Woman" (Roud # 1064). The death was reported in The Times and she was buried, in a pauper's grave in the churchyard, on 15 January 1834.

== Photo gallery ==
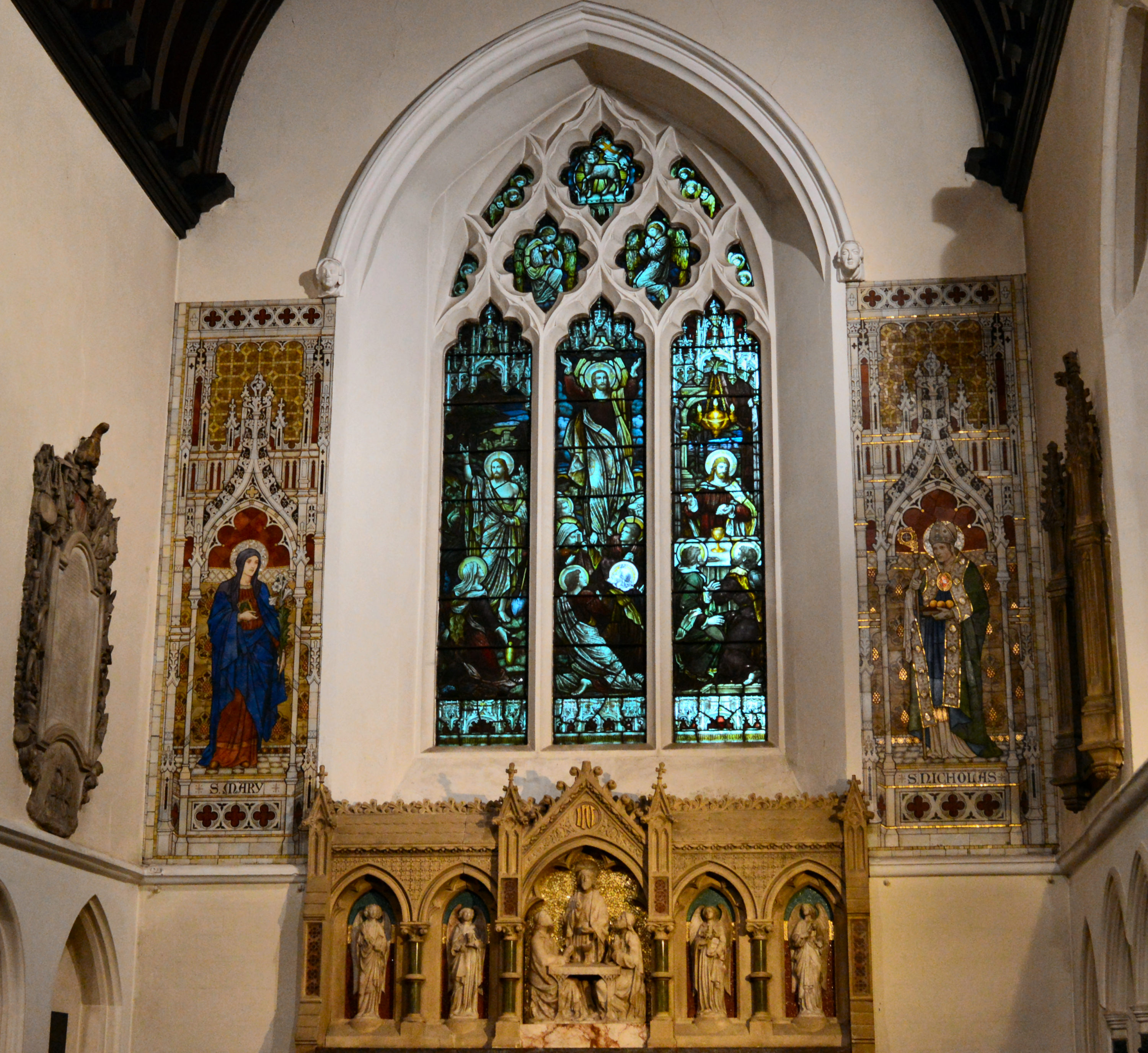
The sanctuary

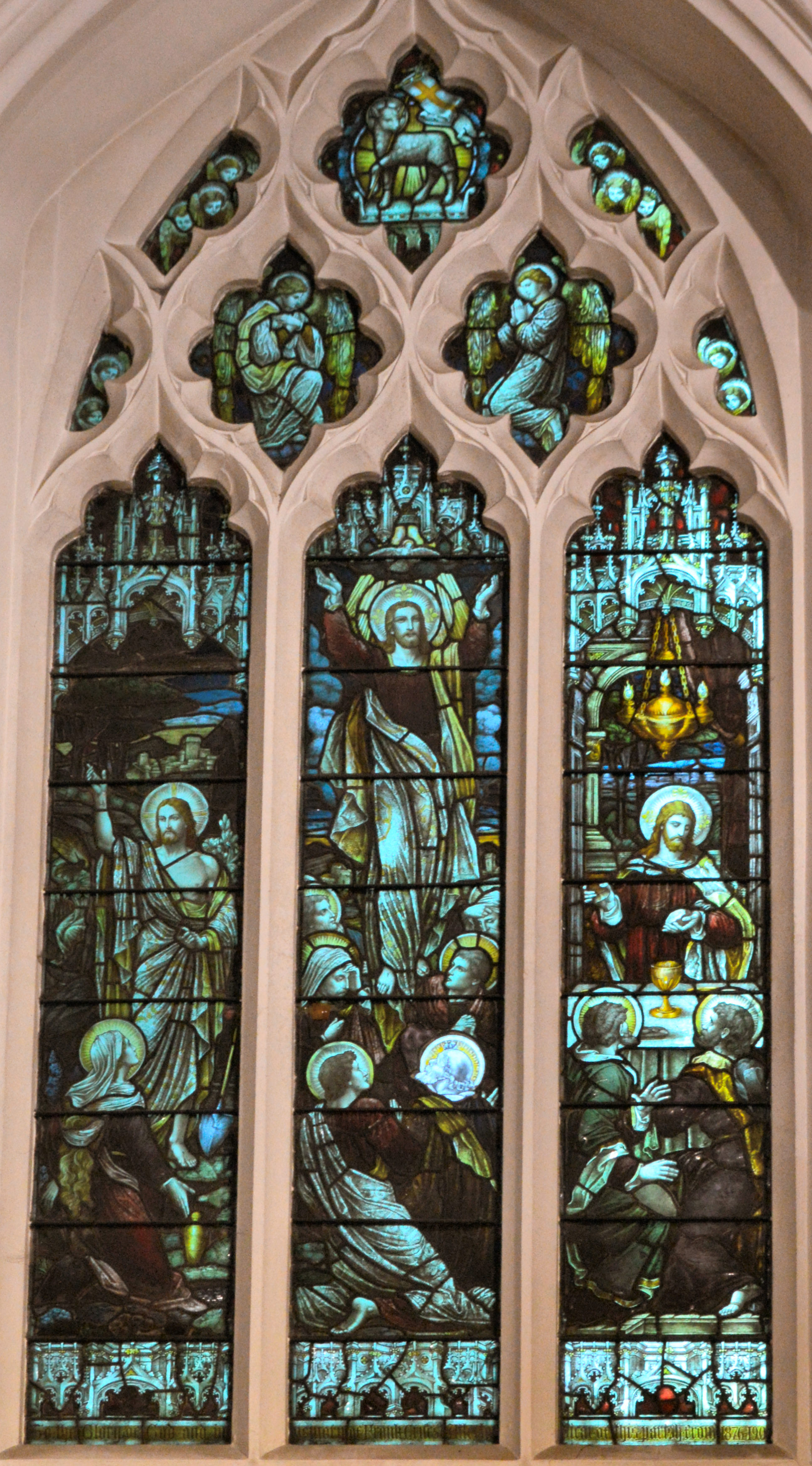
The east window

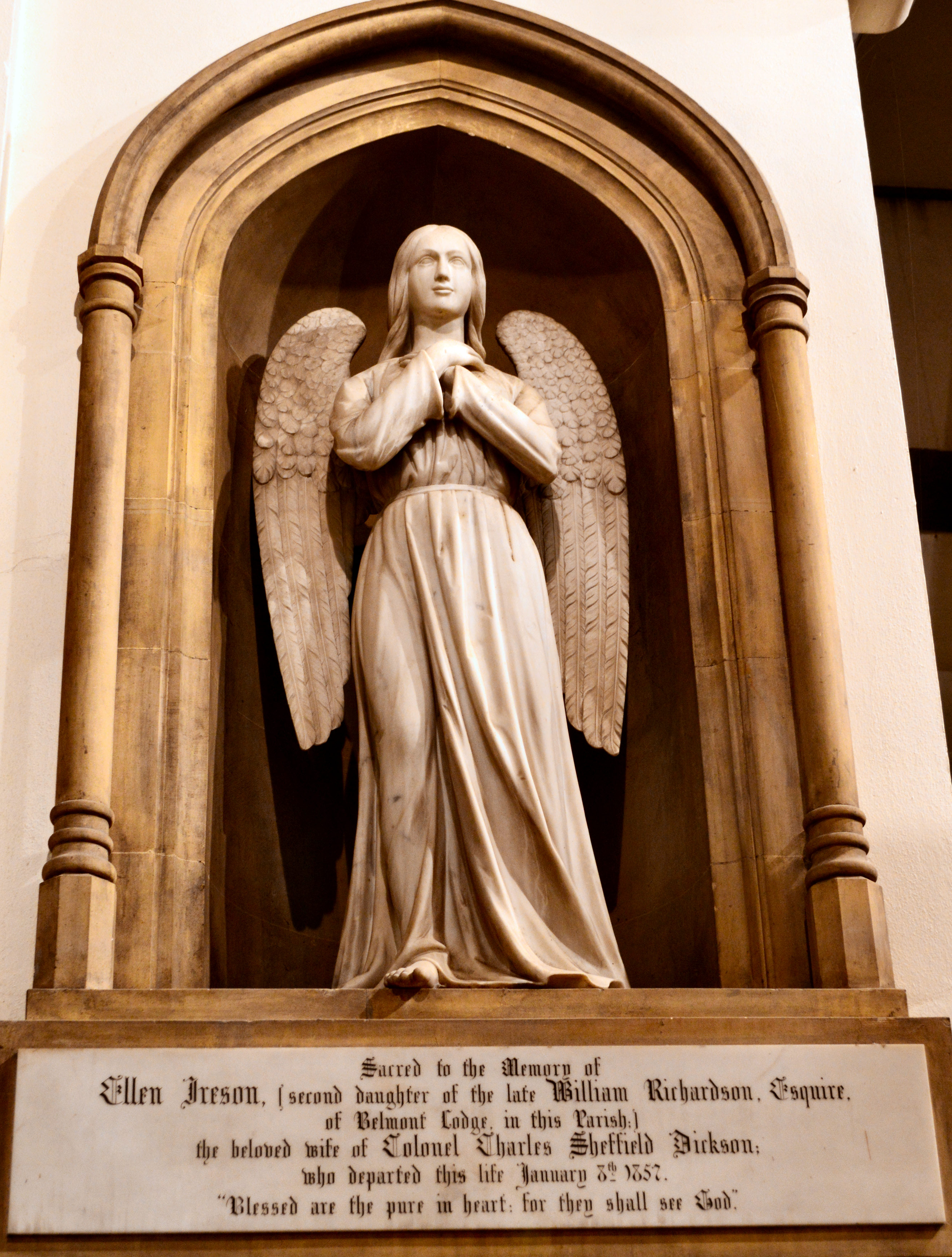
Monument in chancel

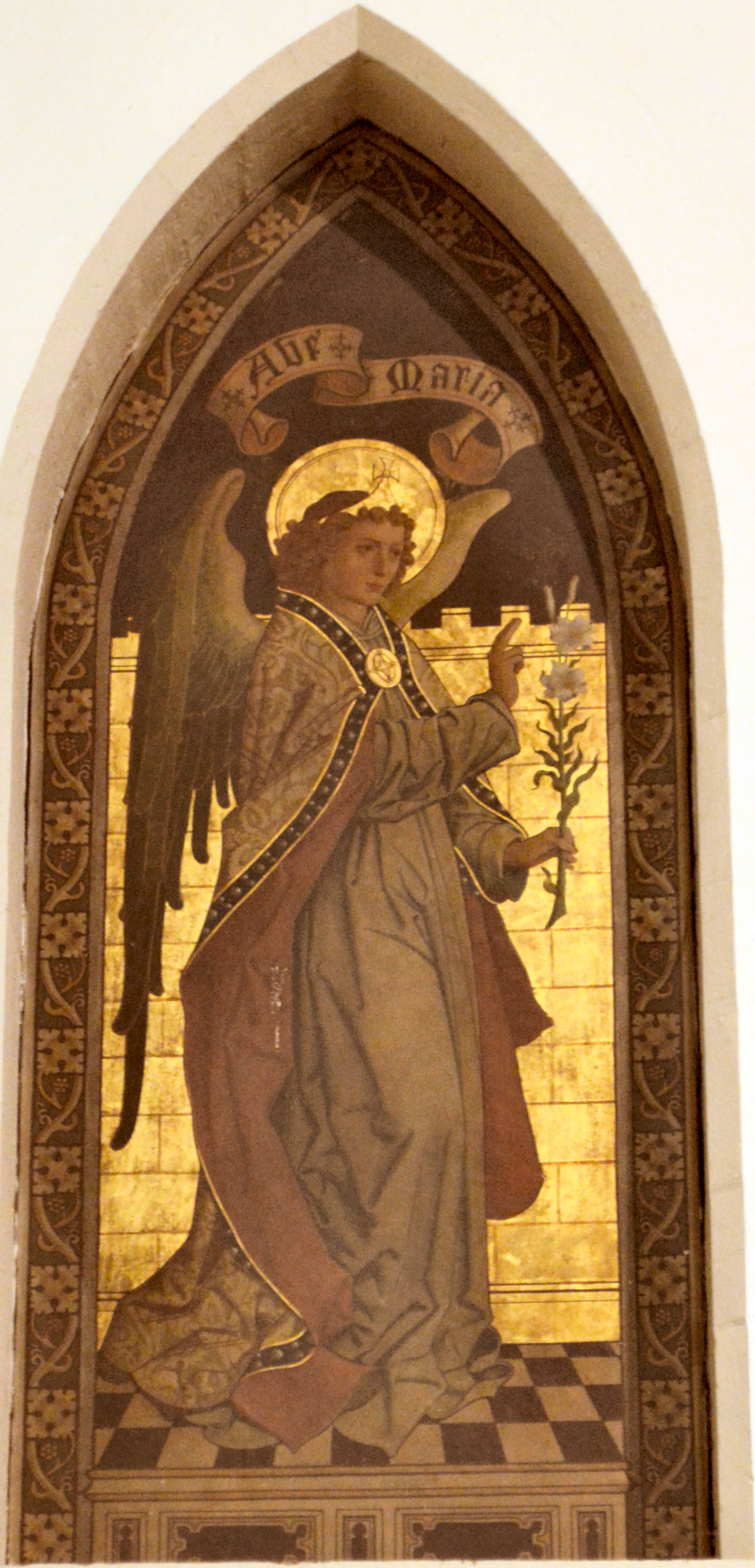
The Annunciation

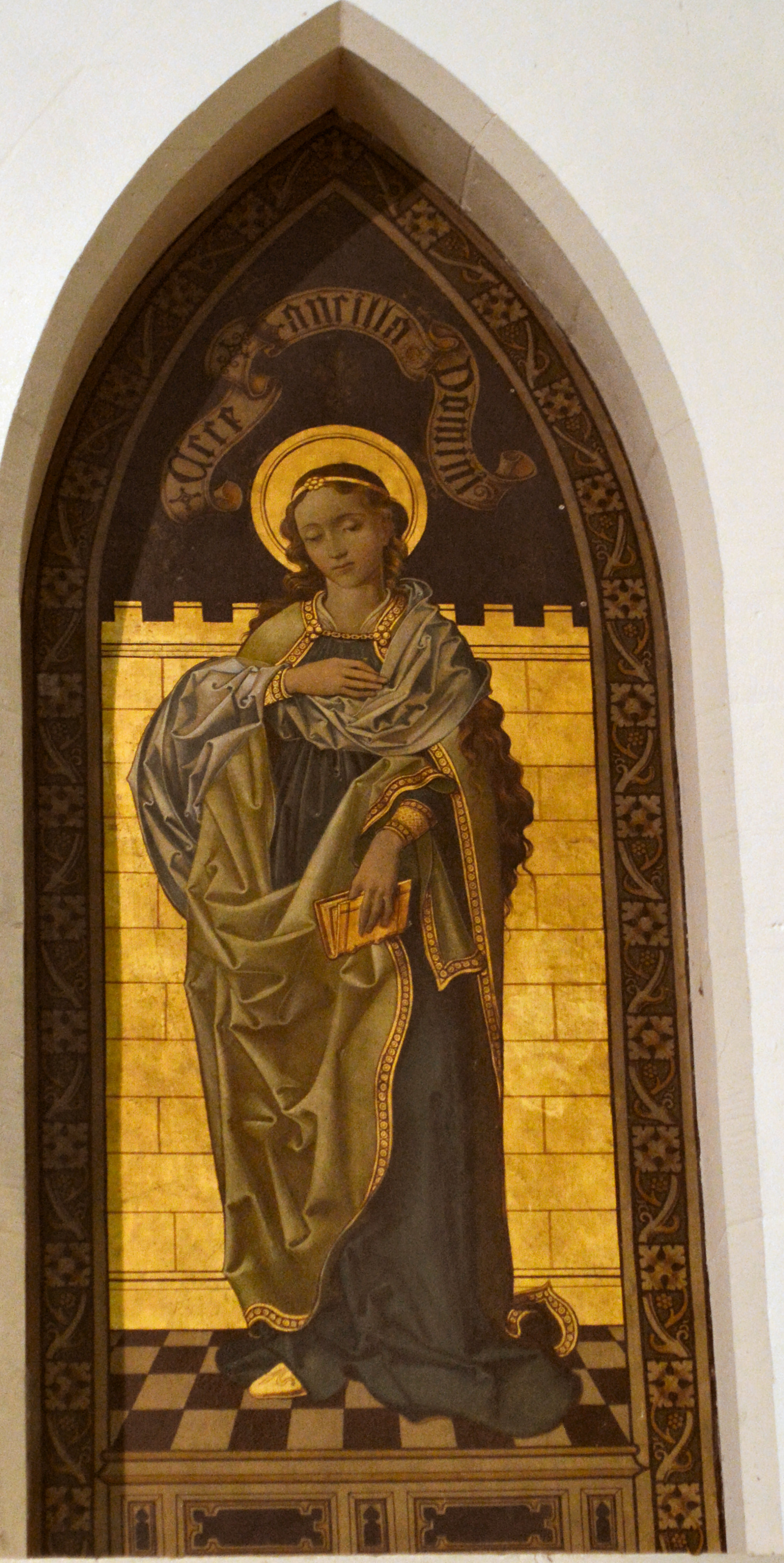
The Annunciation

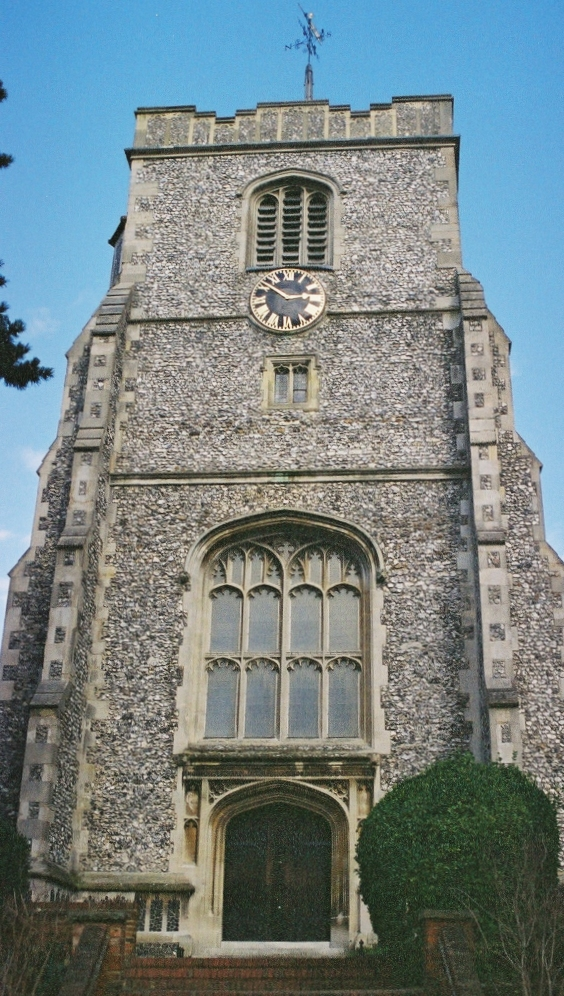
The west face of the 15th-century tower

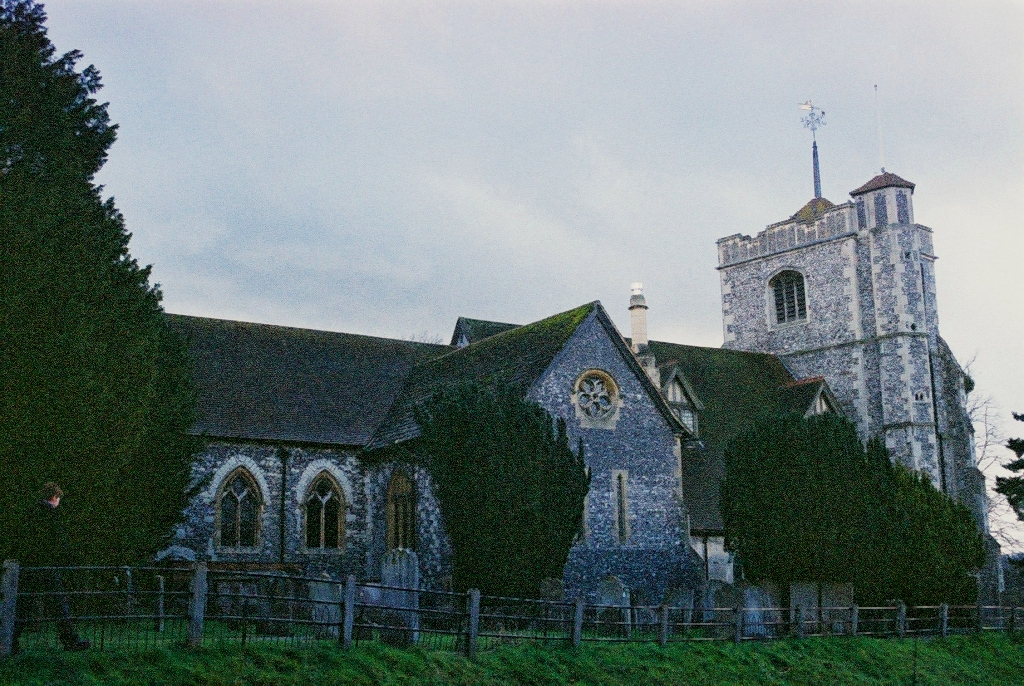
The church from the north/north-east

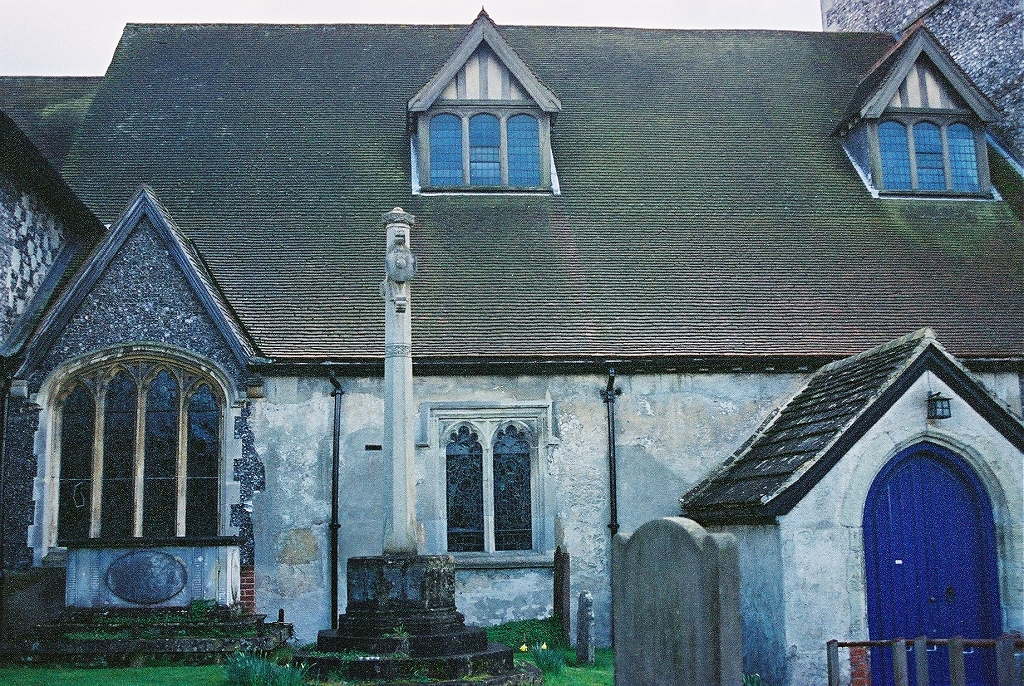
The north side of the nave

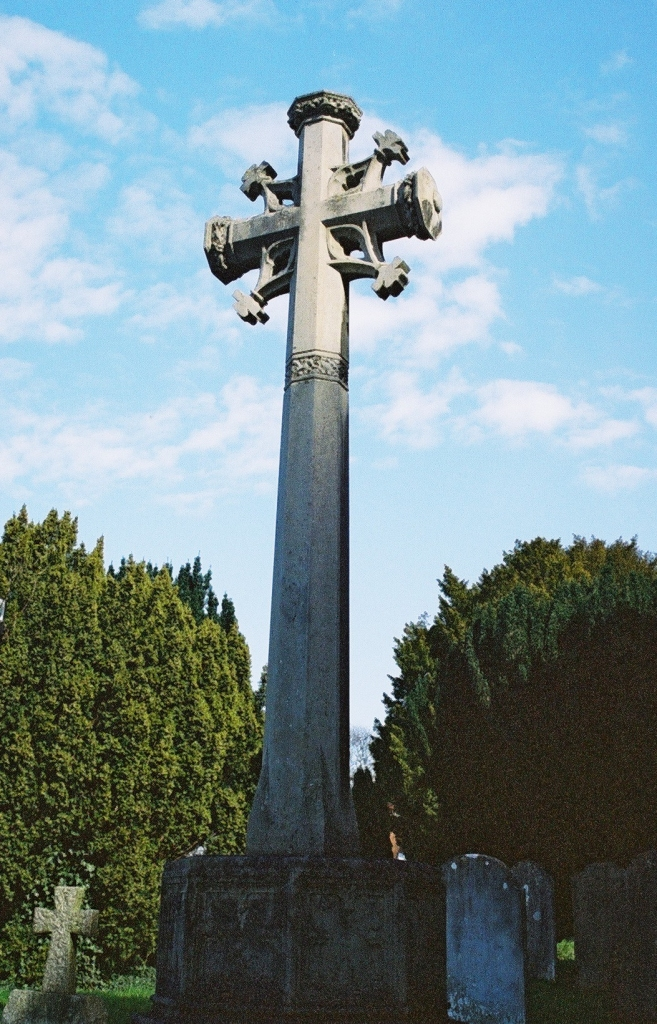
The War Memorial Cross

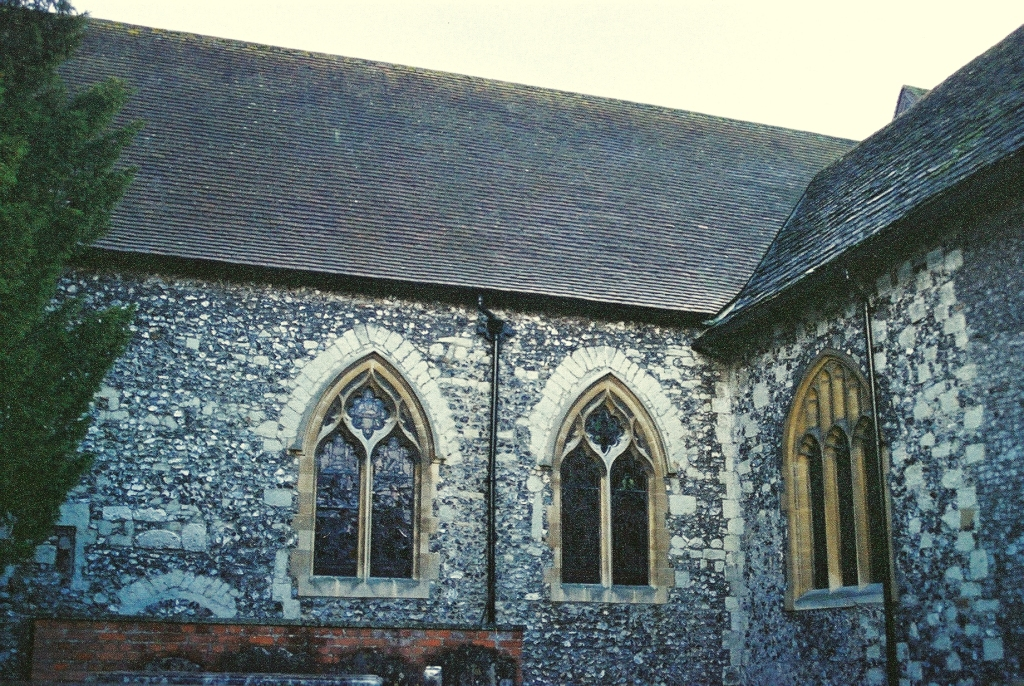
The north side of the chancel

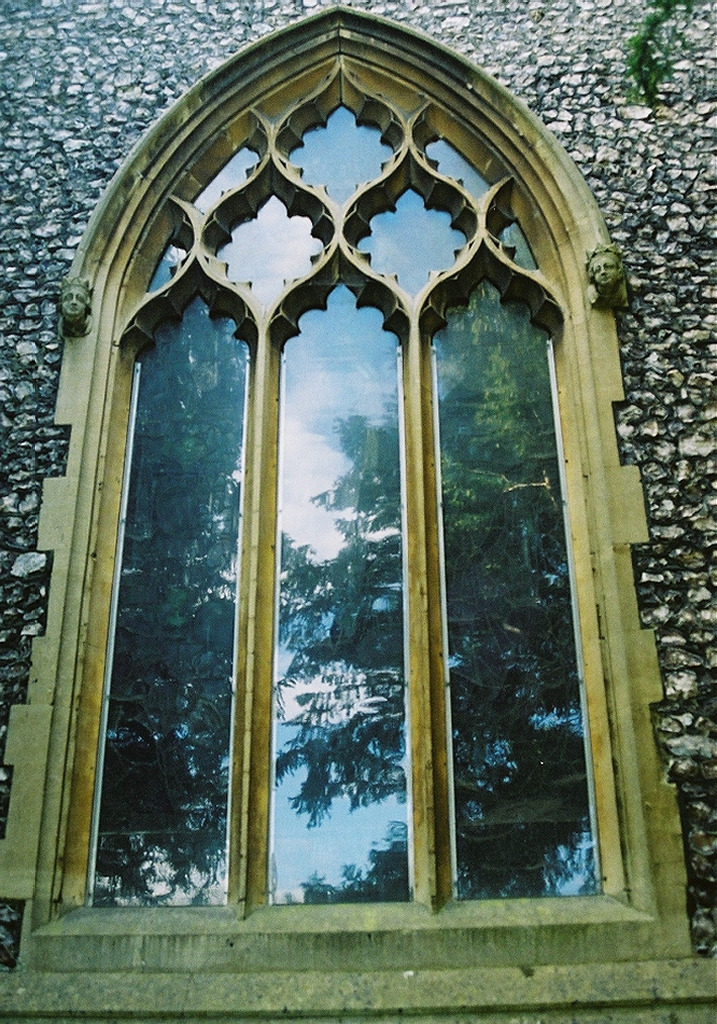
The east window of the chancel

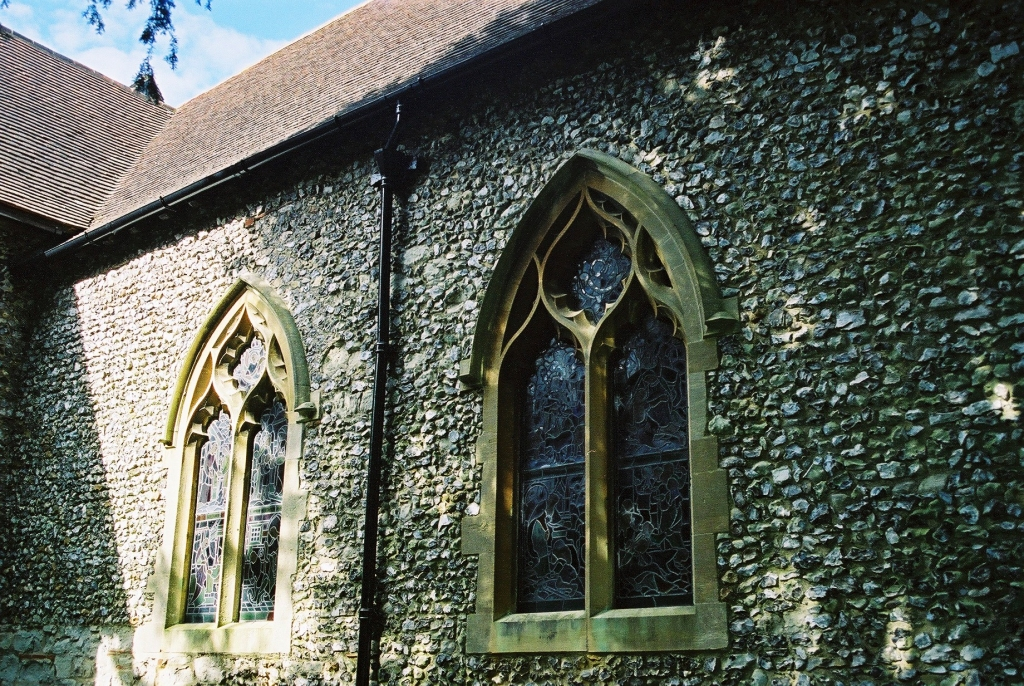
The south side of the chancel

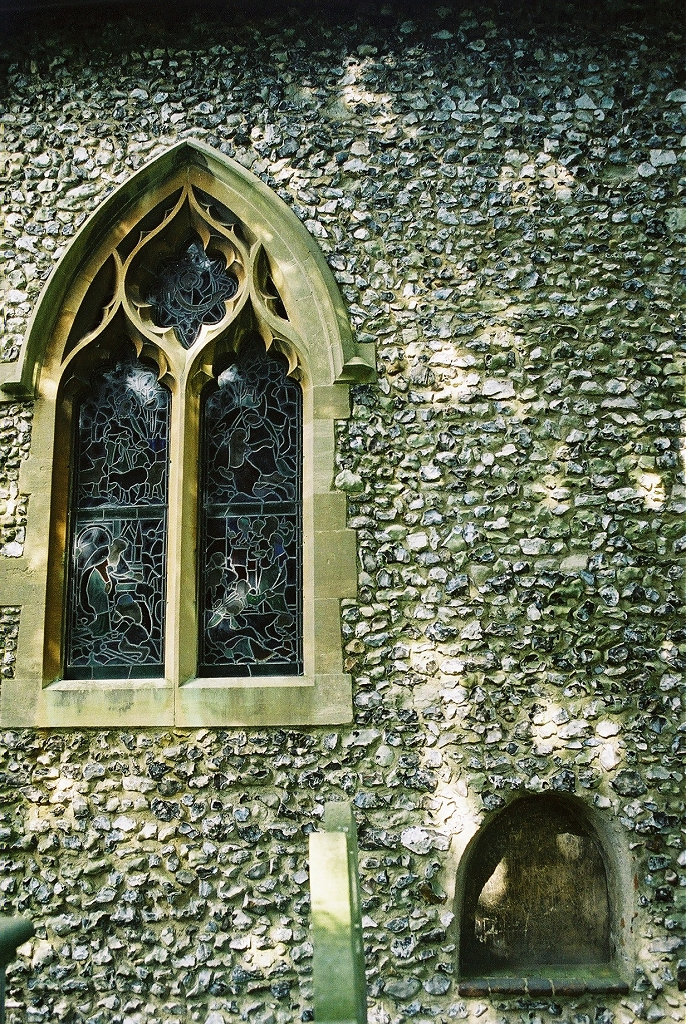
The south side of the chancel, showing a blocked aperture through which an anchorite would once have received the Blessed Sacrament

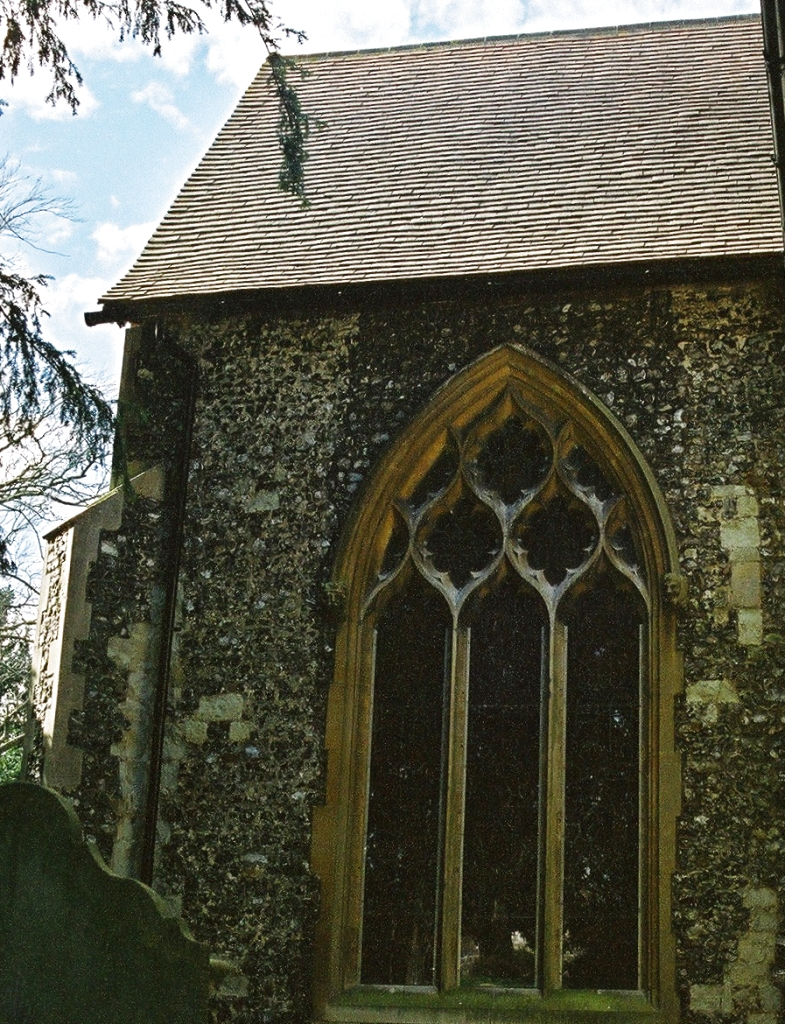
The south transept's decorated east window

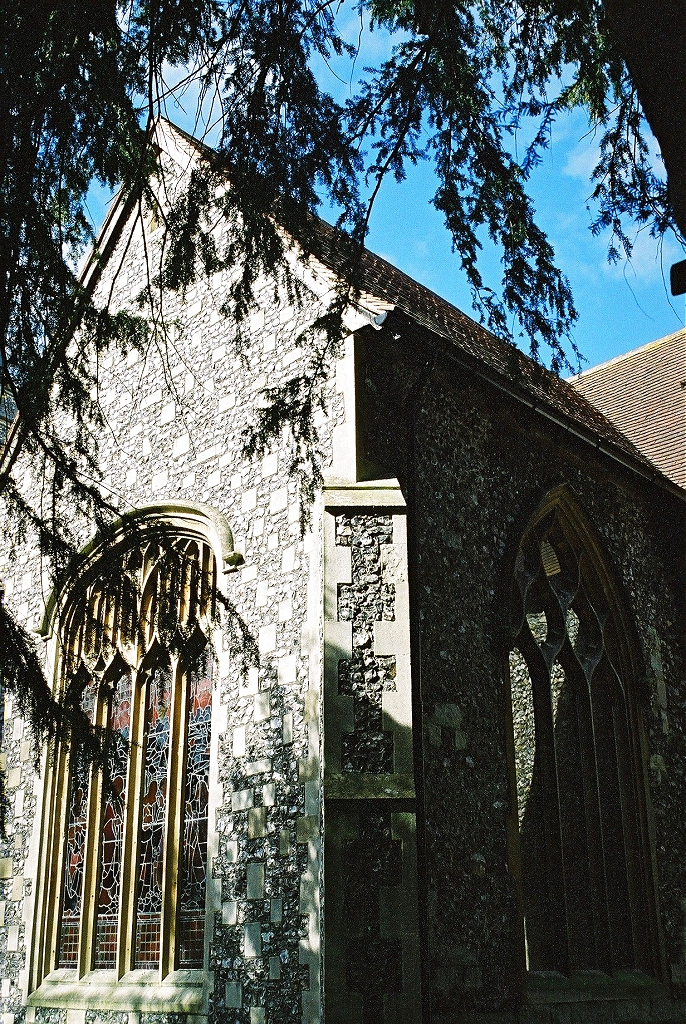
The corner of the south transept, showing the perpendicular south window contrasted with the earlier decorated east window

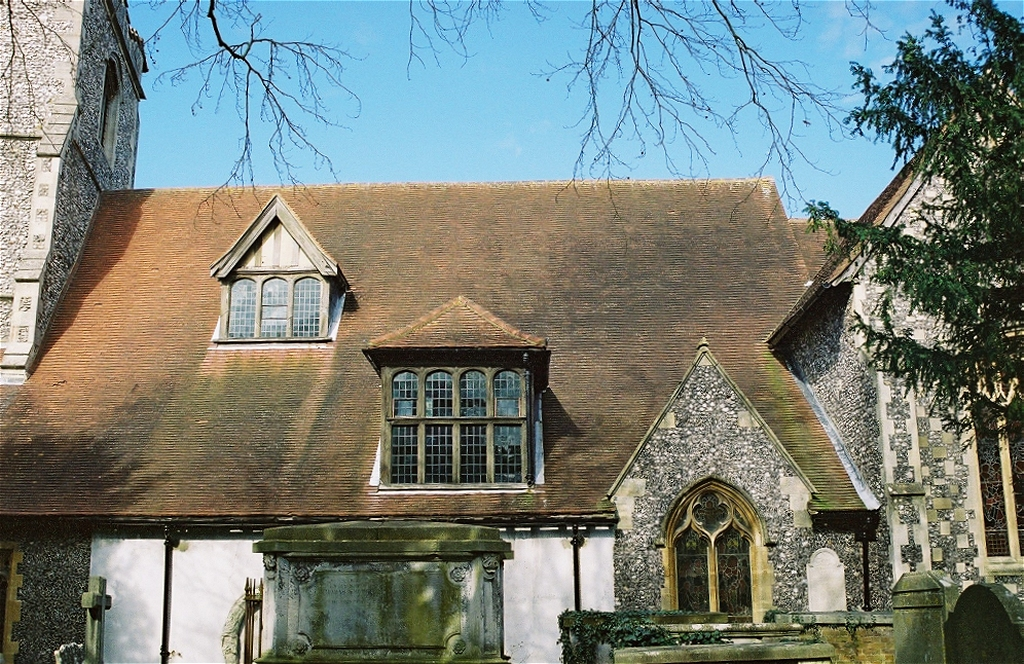
The south side of the nave. Note the higgledy-piggledy appearance of the dormer windows and gables

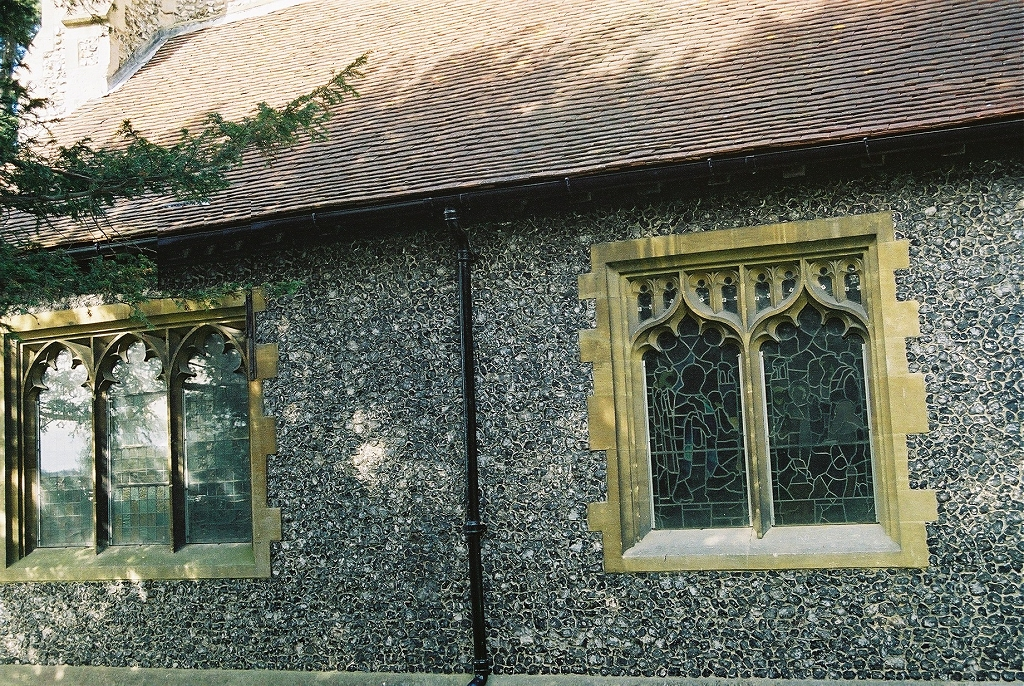
The west end of the south aisle, showing two very obviously Victorian windows

== See also ==
- List of places of worship in Mole Valley
