= Robert Hamilton (moderator, died 1787) =

Robert Hamilton FRSE (19 May 1707 – 3 April 1787) was Professor of Divinity at the University of Edinburgh. He served twice as Moderator of the General Assembly of the Church of Scotland and was also a co-founder of the Royal Society of Edinburgh.

== Life ==
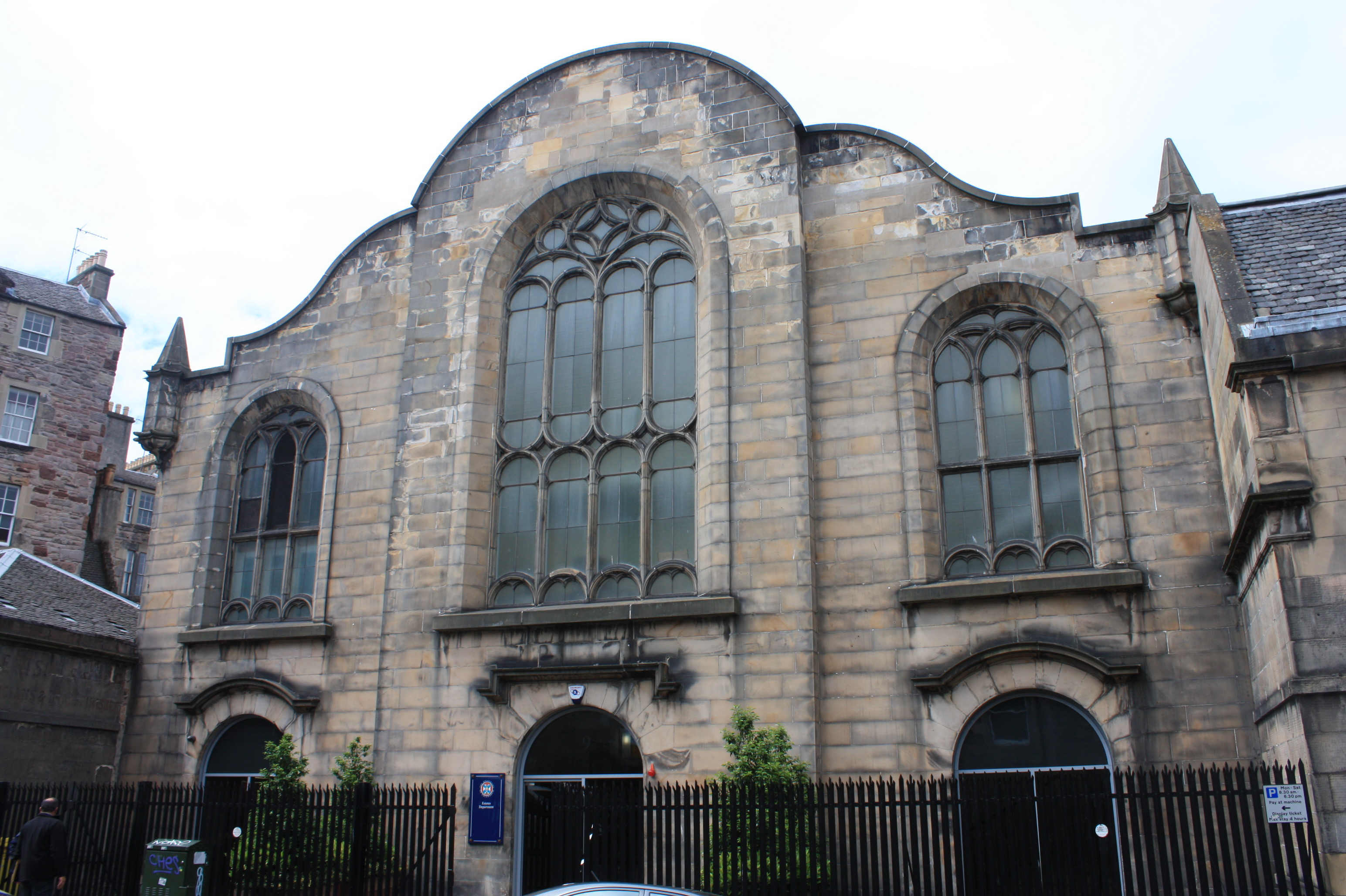
Lady Yester's Church

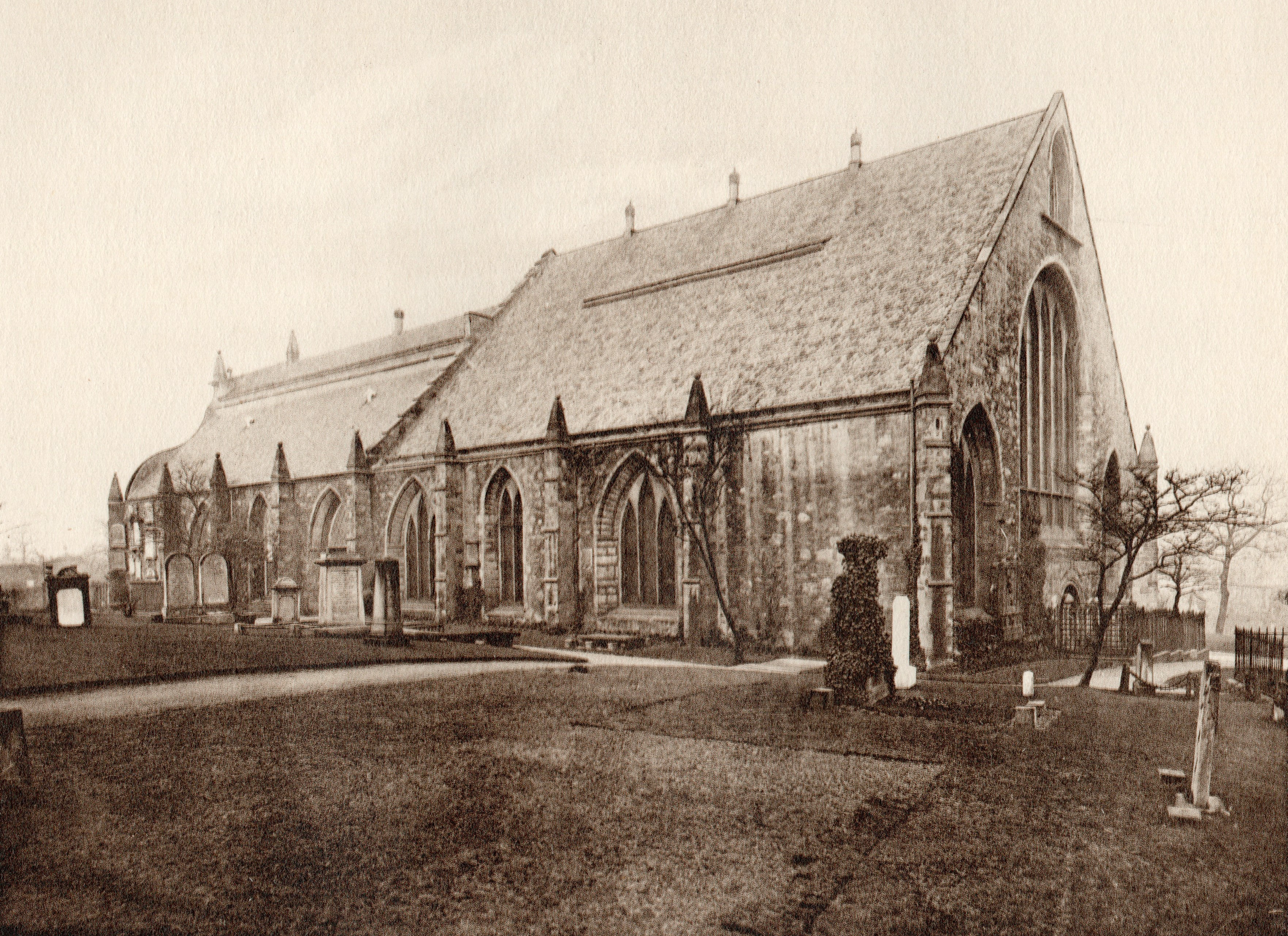
New and Old Greyfriars

He was born on 19 May 1707 in Cramond manse, the fourth son of Very Rev William Hamilton (1669–1732), Principal of the University of Edinburgh and minister of Cramond Kirk. His mother was Mary Robertson (1675–1760). He was educated at the High School in Edinburgh and then studied Divinity at the University of Edinburgh. He was licensed to preach by the Presbytery of Edinburgh in 1730 and in April 1731 was ordained as minister of his father’s parish at Cramond. In 1736 he was translated to Lady Yester’s Kirk and in December 1750 to Old Greyfriars Kirk on the south edge of the then city.

From 1754 to 1779 he served as professor of divinity at the University of Edinburgh. The University granted him a doctorate (DD) in 1759. In both 1754 and 1760 he served as Moderator of the General Assembly of the Church of Scotland. He was also a Dean of the Thistle Chapel in St Giles Cathedral.

In 1785 he is listed in living in quarters at Old College.

He died on 3 April 1787. He is buried in the small cemetery on Buccleuch Street in Edinburgh (built as a relief cemetery to St Cuthbert’s).

== Family ==
He was the father to James Hamilton, the physician, and the uncle to Robert Hamilton, the economist.

In March 1745 he married Jean Hay (1714–1801) daughter of John Hay of Haystoun. Their daughter, Grizel Hamilton, married the eminent Edinburgh surgeon, Benjamin Bell. Their son Gavin Hamilton FRSE (1755–1829) was a surgeon who spent many years in India. A second son Robert Hamilton (1749–1835) was also a surgeon and was also present at the founding of the Royal Society of Edinburgh in 1783, and serving as President of the Royal College of Physicians of Edinburgh from 1792 to 1794.
