= Gilbert Hamilton (minister) =

Scottish minister (1715–1772)

Gilbert Hamilton (1715–1772) was a Scottish minister of the Church of Scotland who served as Moderator of the General Assembly in 1768, the highest position in the Scottish Church.

== Life ==
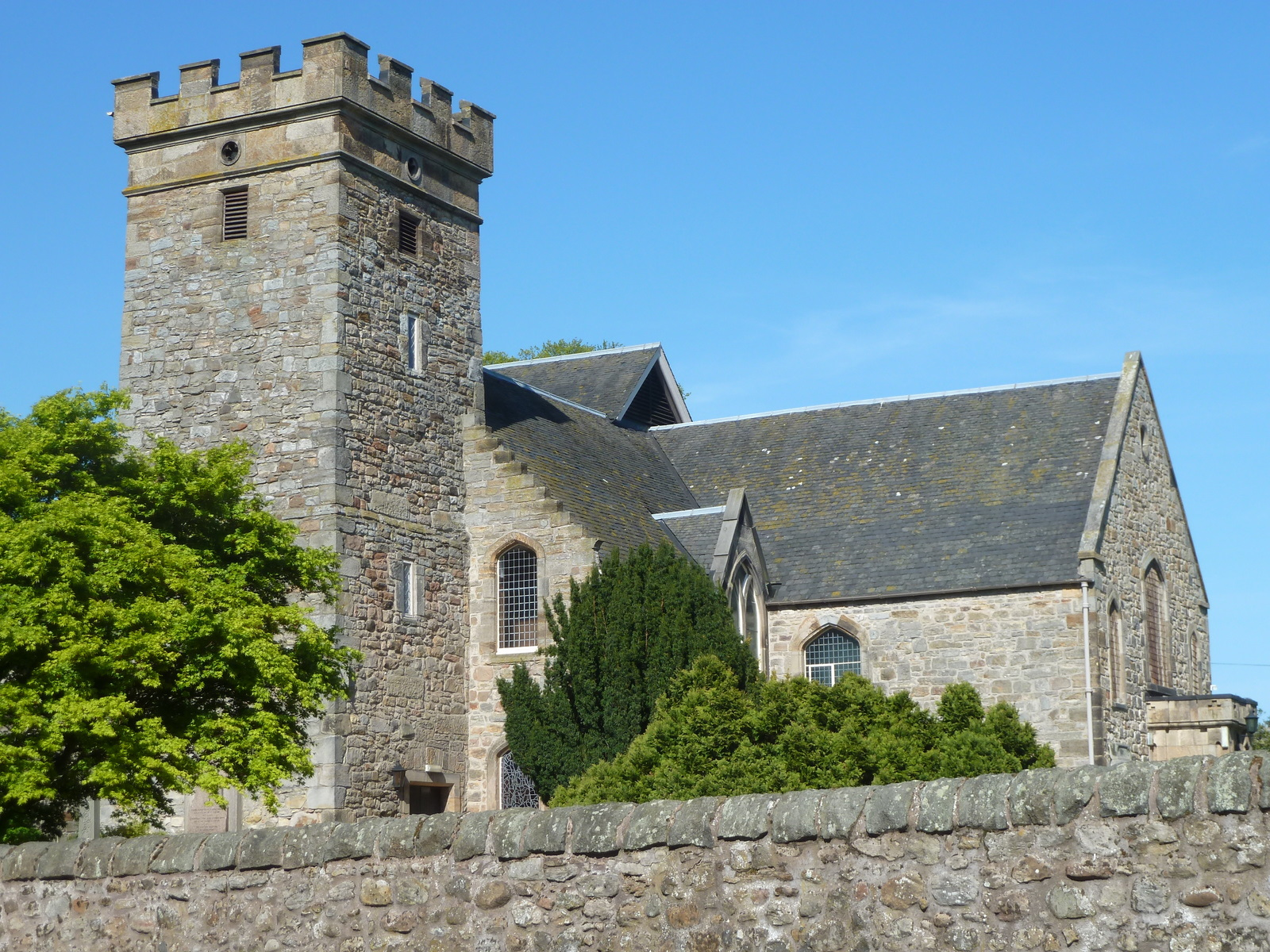
Cramond Kirk

He was born in Edinburgh on 16 May 1715 the son of Rev William Hamilton, Professor of Divinity at the University of Edinburgh and formerly minister of Cramond Kirk, and his wife Mary Robertson. His brother Robert Hamilton was minister of Greyfriars kirk in Edinburgh.

He was educated at the High School in Edinburgh and studied at the University of Edinburgh from around 1729. In 1730 his father became Principal of the University.

In 1736, he was licensed to preach as a minister of the Church of Scotland by the Presbytery of Dalkeith and under the patronage of John Hamilton, 1st Earl of Ruglen was ordained as minister of Cramond Kirk near Edinburgh in March 1737.

In 1760, King's College, Aberdeen awarded him an honorary Doctor of Divinity (DD).

In 1768, he was elected Moderator of the General Assembly in succession to Rev James Murison. In 1770 he was succeeded in turn by Rev James MacKnight.

He died in Cramond manse on 17 May 1772 and is buried in Cramond churchyard.

== Family ==
He married twice: firstly in 1742 to Isabel smith daughter of James Smith of Nether Alderton; secondly in 1754 to Margaret Craigie daughter of John Craigie of Dunbarnie.

He had no children by his first marriage, from his second marriage his children were: Anne Cockburn Hamilton (b.1756); Mary (b.1758) who married William Dinwiddie of Manchester; Susan (b. 1761) married Patrick Anderson WS.

== Publications ==
- The Disorders of a Church (1752)
