= Robert Ramsay (principal) =

Minister and school principal

Robert Ramsay (1594–1651) was a minister of the Church of Scotland who served as Principal of Glasgow University.

== Life ==
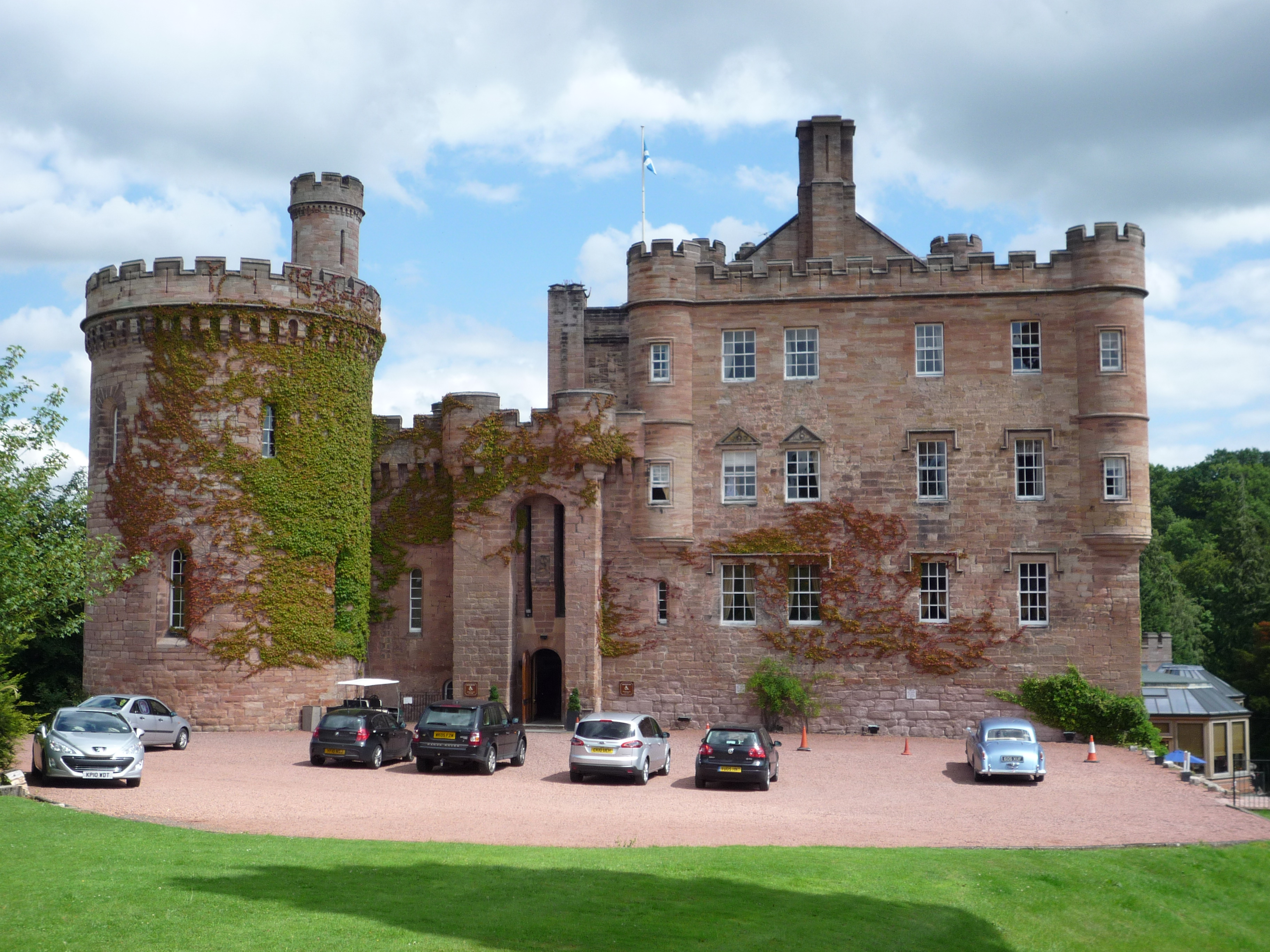
Dalhousie Castle

He was born at Dalhousie Castle south of Edinburgh the son of George Ramsay (1571-1629) and his wife Margaret Colville.

He was educated at Glasgow University graduating MA in 1618. He began work as a schoolteacher in Irvine, but then from 1625 served as a Church of Scotland minister at Dundonald, South Ayrshire. In December 1640 he translated to Blackfriars Church in Glasgow. In April 1647 he moved to St Mungo's Church, Glasgow.

In 1648 he was elected Rector of Glasgow University and was appointed Principal on 28 August 1651 in place of John Strang (who had resigned). However, he died on 4 September of the same year, after only a few days in office.

He is buried in Canongate Kirkyard in Edinburgh.

== Family ==
He married twice: firstly Marion Mure of Airdhill granddaughter and heir of William Mure of Irvine; secondly Janet Campbell, daughter of Hugh Campbell of Hullerhurst. By the second marriage he had a son, James Ramsay (1624-1696), Bishop of Dunblane, and a daughter Margaret Ramsay, who married Alexander Mylne of Linlithgow.
