= John Paterson (bishop of Ross) =

The Right Reverend John Paterson
- Bishop of Ross
- Church: Church of Scotland
- Diocese: Ross
- In office: 1662–1679
- Predecessor: John Maxwell
- Successor: Alexander Young

Orders
- Consecration: 7 May 1662, Holyrood Palace by James Sharp

Personal details
- Born: 1604 Scotland
- Died: January 1679 (aged 74–75) Fortrose (?)
- Spouse: Elizabeth Ramsay
- Children: 7
- Education: King's College, Aberdeen

John Paterson (1604–1679) was the Bishop of Ross in Scotland.

== Life ==
Paterson graduated from King's College, Aberdeen in 1624, and was appointed to the church of Foveran, Aberdeenshire, in 1632. He refused to sign the National Covenant of 1639, and fled to England to the king. In July of the following year, however, he recanted in a sermon before the general assembly and was restored to his church at Foveran.

Paterson was a member of the commission of the assembly in 1644, 1645, 1648 and 1649. In 1661, he was named a commissioner for the visitation of the university of Aberdeen. In 1649, he had left Foveran to become minister of Ellon in Aberdeenshire. He was among the benefactors contributing to the erection of a new building at King's College, Aberdeen, in 1658.

In 1659, Paterson was translated to the ministry of Aberdeen (the third charge). In 1662, he was appointed the Bishop of Ross, being consecrated on 7 May 1662 at Holyrood Palace, Edinburgh. He was opposed to the preaching of the Covenanting Presbyterian John M'Gilligen. He died in January 1679, aged 74 or 75.

== Burial ==
John Paterson was buried 24 January 1679.

== Family ==
Paterson was married to Elizabeth Ramsay, by whom he had six sons and a daughter. His children were John Paterson (Archbishop of Glasgow), George Paterson of Seafield (commissary); Sir William Paterson of Granton (barrister and clerk to the privy council); Thomas Paterson; Robert Paterson (principal of Marischal College, Aberdeen); James Paterson; and a daughter, Isabella, who married Kenneth Mackenzie of Suddie.

== Sources ==
- Keith, Robert, An Historical Catalogue of the Scottish Bishops: Down to the Year 1688, (London, 1824)
- Macray, W. D. (1895). "Paterson, John (1632-1708)" . In Lee, Sidney (ed.). Dictionary of National Biography. Vol. 44. London: Smith, Elder & Co.
- Pearce, A. S. Wayne, "Paterson, John (1604–1679)", Oxford Dictionary of National Biography, Oxford University Press, 2004 retrieved 10 May 2007

Attribution

This article incorporates text from a publication now in the public domain: "Paterson, John (1632-1708)". Dictionary of National Biography. London: Smith, Elder & Co. 1885–1900.

Church of Scotland titles
Preceded by John Maxwell	Bishop of Ross; 1662–1679	Succeeded by Alexander Young
