= William Crichton (minister) =

Scottish minister of the Church of Scotland 1630–1708

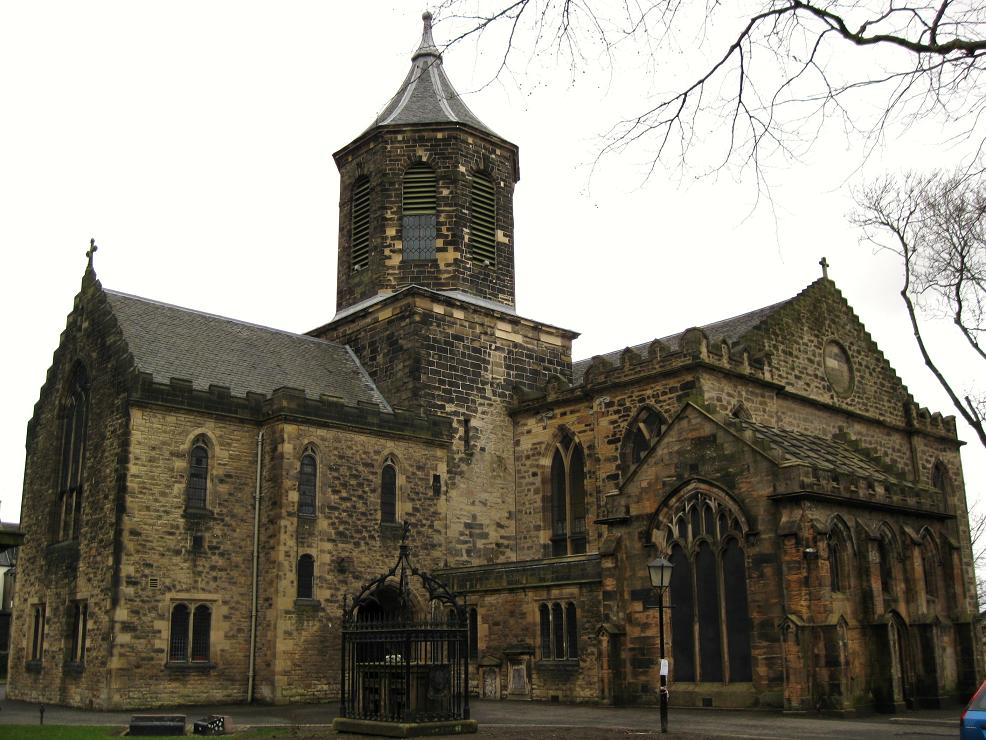
Falkirk Parish Church

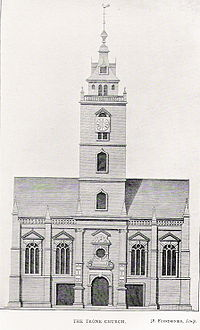
Tron Kirk as it appeared in 1700

William Crichton (1630–1708) was a Scottish minister of the Church of Scotland who twice served as Moderator of the General Assembly, the highest position in the Scottish Church.

== Life ==
He was probably from Edinburgh or the surrounding part of east Scotland. He attended Edinburgh University and graduated MA in July 1649.

He was ordained as minister of Bathgate in April 1654 by the Protesting Presbytery. He served there for 39 years; during this period he served as Moderator of the General Assembly in 1692. In 1693, he translated to Falkirk Parish Church. In 1695, he translated to the prestigious Tron Kirk on Edinburgh's Royal Mile, replacing Rev William Erskine who had died unexpectedly.

In 1697, serving at the Tron, he was again elected Moderator.

Due to his position he was one of the main religious inputs into the agreements leading to the Act of Union of 1707, in which Scotland lost its political power, but (partly through his influence) fully retained its religious independence.

He retired on 12 May 1707 and was granted a pension of 1000 Scots merks per year (around £650 in English equivalent, around £160,000 per year in 2021) by Edinburgh Town Council, an extremely generous sum. However, he only collected this for around 18 months, dying on 17 November 1708 aged 77. His position at the Tron Kirk was filled by Rev William Wishart.

== Family ==
Although he is known to have been married with children, nothing is known of the names of his wife or children.

By 1770 there were only three Crichton families of note in Edinburgh: James Crichton, a brewer on the Canongate; Mr Crichton, a coach-builder at the back of the Canongate; and Mrs Crichton, a vintner on Bernard Street in Leith.
