= Alexander Young (bishop) =

17th-century Scottish bishop

Alexander Young (died 1684) was a Scottish bishop.

== Life ==
Young was born in Aberdeen, in the year 1629. He became a minister in the Scottish Church, but his training is unclear. At this time King Charles was imposing bishops upon the Scottish Church, which the majority opposed. These were troubled times in the Scottish Church which eventually resulted in the Scottish Episcopalians Act 1711 effectively splitting the church.

In 1664 he was translated as minister of Dalmeny to minister of Cramond Kirk. In 1666 he moved to the Archdeaconry of St Andrews.

In the winter of 1671, he became Bishop of Edinburgh, a position he held until his translation to be Bishop of Ross in 1679. This had been arranged by the Duchess of Lauderdale in order to allow John Paterson, Bishop of Galloway (not John Paterson, Young's predecessor at Ross) to hold the Diocese of Edinburgh. Young suffered from an ailment and in 1684 travelled to France to have an operation. He failed to survive the operation and died several weeks afterwards.

Church of Scotland titles
| Preceded by George Wishart | Bishop of Edinburgh; 1671–1679 | Succeeded by John Paterson |
| Preceded by John Paterson | Bishop of Ross; 1679–1684 | Succeeded by James Ramsay |
