= John Cruickshank (mathematician) =

Scottish mathematician (1787–1875)

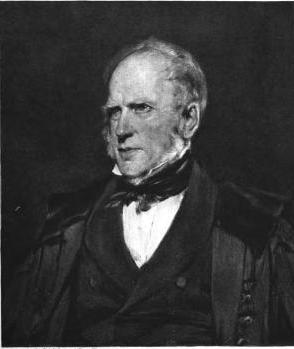
thurnbail

John Cruickshank (5 July 1787 – 19 November 1875) was a Scottish mathematician.

== Life ==
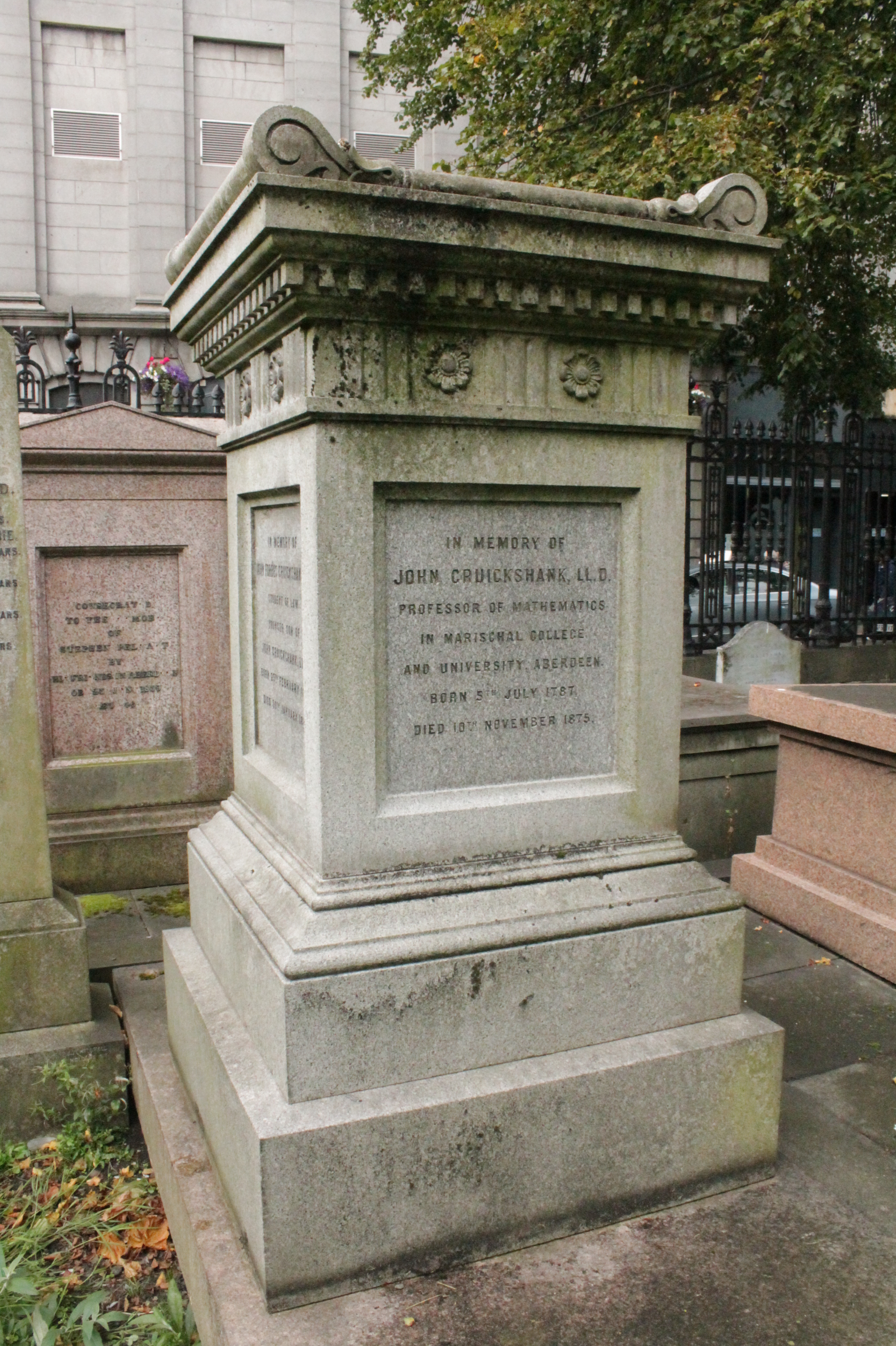
The grave of Prof John Cruickshank, Kirk of St Nicholas, Aberdeen

He was born at Barnhills farm, near Rothiemay, on 5 July 1787, the son of James Cruickshank (d. 1794), a weaver living on the farm. In 1794, on the death of his father, the family moved to be with an aunt at Knowehead farm in Marnoch. His early years were spent as a shepherd boy and he had little education.

From 1803, he studied at Marischal College in Aberdeen and was a Gray bursar. He graduated MA in 1809. In 1814, he did a years Divinity study, supporting himself by working as a private tutor at Haddo House. He then began lecturing in mathematics at Aberdeen.

In 1817, he succeeded Prof Robert Hamilton as Professor of Mathematics.

In 1823, he reduced the students' Christmas vacation from three days to one to improve performance. It is unlikely that this was popular.

Cruickshank also acted as a university administrator and fund-raiser, both with great success. He organised building work in 1821 and was university librarian from 1844 to 1860. In the outside world, he was involved in banking and finance and was one of the earliest in Britain to advocate decimalization of currency (on the French basis).

He retired in 1860 but continued to work as a school inspector and to do charitable works.

He died on 19 November 1875 and is buried in the churchyard of the Kirk of St Nicholas.

== Family ==
In 1818, he married Janet Mitchell (1789–1879).

In 1898, his daughter Anne Hamilton Cruickshank (1820–1911) set up a fund in memory of her brother Alexander (1819–1897), and this fund was used to maintain the Botanical Gardens. She also erected a stained-glass window in the library of Marischal College in memory of her father. This window was removed in 1970 and placed in storage.

A second son, John Forbes Cruickshank (1823–1842) died young.

== Memorials ==
A stained-glass window to Cruickshank by Douglas Strachan, which was formerly in the central window over the entrance to Marischal College, is now in the Victoria and Albert Museum, Dundee.
