= James Wishart =

British naval officer and politician

Admiral of the White Sir James Wishart
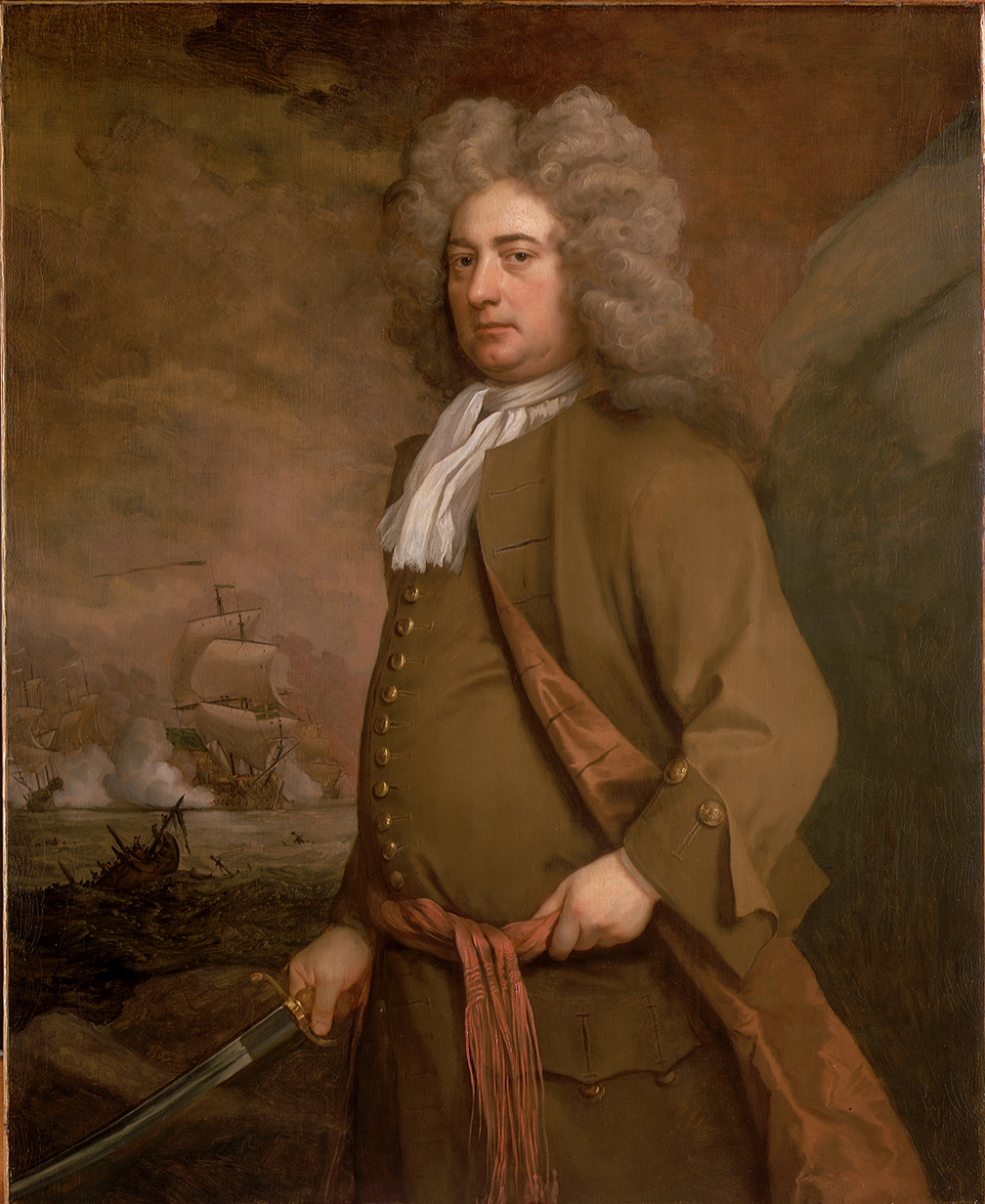
- Portrait by Michael Dahl
- Born: 1659
- Died: 30 May 1723 (aged 63–64)
- Military career
- Allegiance: England
- Branch: Royal Navy
- Rank: Admiral of the White
- Commands: HMS Pearl; HMS Mary Galley; HMS Swiftsure; Mediterranean Fleet
- Conflicts: War of the Spanish Succession

Admiral of the White Sir James Wishart (1659 – 30 May 1723) was a British naval officer and politician. Wishart served at the Battle of Cadiz and the Battle of Vigo Bay in 1702 and at the Capture of Gibraltar.

== Biography ==
James Wishart was not the eldest in the family and he joined the Dutch States Navy and reputedly commanded a Dutch warship. His elder brother George became a baronet and a lieutenant colonel whilst his brother William Wishart became the Principal of Edinburgh University. Wishart returned to Great Britain with William of Orange and he was rewarded, as he became a captain of HMS Pearl in 1689 and later he moved to HMS Mary Galley. Wishart captained HMS Swiftsure and became a favourite of Sir George Rooke after becoming his flag captain in 1695 on the recently renamed HMS Queen. He served at the Battle of Cadiz and the Battle of Vigo Bay in 1702.

In 1703-4 Wishart was with Sir George Rooke at the Capture of Gibraltar. By 1704 Rooke was threatening to resign when he found out that William Whetstone who lacked Wishart's seniority had been promoted to rear-admiral of the blue in preference to his captain. Rooke suspected that Wishart had been passed over either to slight him or because of Wishart's Scottish ancestry. Rooke noted that Wishart had recently moved to Yorkshire with his wife as way of mitigation of Jacobite leanings. Rooke's protest resulted in Wishart also being promoted to rear-admiral of the blue and it was backdated to the same date as his competitor was promoted.

Rooke and Wishart were in the Mediterranean later the same year and Wishart was given a knighthood on his return. The success was short-lived however as both Rooke and Wishart lost their positions the following year. Wishart was placed on half pay and it was not until 1710 that his career progressed further when he became an Admiralty Lord. After having been defeated as a Tory parliamentary candidate for Portsmouth in the 1710 election, he was successfully returned on petition the following year, sitting until 1715.

Wishart was sent to The Hague where he unsuccessfully lobbied the Dutch to form an alliance against the French. His last naval role was as Commander-in-Chief of the Mediterranean Fleet taking over from Sir John Jennings in December 1713. Wishart was always suspected of being of a Jacobite persuasion. When George I of Great Britain became king, Wishart lost his line management role and he died childless on 30 May 1723 at the rank of Admiral of the White.

== Private life ==
He married Cordelia Raper of Bedale, North Yorkshire and lived at 53 High Street, Portsmouth. They had no children and his legacy of £20,000 went first to his wife. Wishart's will stipulated that anyone who ever owned his land or money needed to take his surname. The money eventually went to his nephew William Wishart who was Principal at Edinburgh University in 1736 or 1737. There is a memorial to Wishart, erected by his brother also William in the Church of St. Mary & St. Nicholas, Leatherhead. The memorial features a good biography and models of ships.

== Legacy ==
He had his portrait painted by Michael Dahl.

The Royal Navy has named one ship, the destroyer HMS Wishart (D67), after James Wishart; she was in commission from 1920 to 1945. Lord Louis Mountbatten was her commanding officer for a time, and when he was trying to inspire their crew he joked that the ship had the best name in the navy making the pun, "Our Father Wishart in Heaven..."
