= William Hamilton (university principal) =

Scottish Presbyterian theologian and minister

William Hamilton (1669–1732) was a Scottish Presbyterian Theologian and Minister of the Church of Scotland. He was Professor of Divinity at the University of Edinburgh from 1709 to 1732, and Principal of the University from 1730 to 1732.

== Life ==
He was born in 1669 the son of Gavin Hamilton of Airdrie, North Lanarkshire. He studied at Edinburgh University graduating around 1688.

He was ordained as a Church of Scotland minister in September 1694 at Cramond Kirk. In 1709 he left Cramond to be Professor of Divinity at Edinburgh University. He was also Moderator of the General Assembly of the Church of Scotland on five occasions: 1712, 1716, 1720, 1727 and 1730.

The elder Hamilton was an influential figure in the growth of "early moderatism", and several of his students, including Wishart, were prominent Rankenians.

In 1732, having been promoted to Principal of Edinburgh University in 1730, he took on the additional role of Collegiate Minister to the New (West) Kirk in St Giles which was then split into four parishes internally.

He died in Edinburgh on 12 November 1732.

== Family ==
In 1696 he married Mary Robertson of Glasgow (1674-1760). His sons included:

- William Hamilton an Edinburgh merchant
- Gavin Hamilton an Edinburgh bookseller, father of Robert Hamilton, the economist
- Very Rev Prof Robert Hamilton.
- Rev Gilbert Hamilton who was Moderator in 1768.
- Dr. Alexander Hamilton, author of Gentleman's Progress: The Itinerarium of Dr. Alexander Hamilton
- Jean Hamilton married Hugh Cleghorn
- Margaret, married William Tod
- Anne, married Rev John Horsley of Newington Butts, parents to Bishop Samuel Horsley

== Notes ==
Preceded by William Wishart (primus)	Principals of Edinburgh University; 1730–1732	Succeeded by James Smith (educator)
