= John Knox (rebel minister) =

Soldier and Church of Scotland clergyman

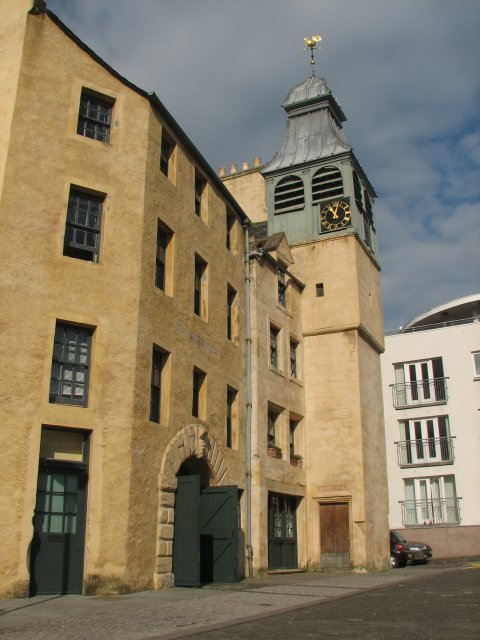
Saint Ninian's Manse incorporates the tower of the 17th-century former parish church

John Knox (active mid 17th century) was a Scottish soldier and minister of the Church of Scotland during the Wars of the Three Kingdoms. He was imprisoned several times. Establishing his own church (the John Knox Church), this was named after himself rather than John Knox his famous forebear.

He was of Scots birth and was probably born around 1620 in East Lothian or Midlothian. He bore the same name as John Knox but whilst of the same lineage, was at best a distant nephew.

In the 1640s he is mentioned as a "probationer" (junior clergy under training) whilst simultaneously serving in the Scottish army. Around 1645 he conveyed the Earl of Angus and several ladies by boat from Edinburgh to North Berwick as part of a scheme allowing the Duke to evade the authorities.

In 1651 he was chaplain to the Scottish garrison at Tantallon Castle during the siege by Cromwell's troops. Knox was based at Edinburgh Castle as Chaplain when it was captured later in 1651 and was taken prisoner.

In 1653 he succeeded Andrew Fairfoul as minister of North Leith Parish Church. Fairfoul had been translated to Duns. He left North Leith Parish Church in 1662. He appears to have set up his own church, the John Knox Church, bearing his name. This was held in a large meeting house on Sheriff Brae (Shirra Brae) on the opposite bank of the Water of Leith in what was the separate parish of South Leith. He corresponded with Charles II in exile and supported the King financially.

In 1684 he was imprisoned on the Bass Rock for being a Non-Conformist, he was later transferred to the Tolbooth Prison in Leith.

The John Knox Church in South Leith continued under that name. In 1687 South Leith Parish Church appointed the young William Wishart in his first post, as minister of the John Knox Church.
