= George Wishart (bishop) =

Scottish bishop and author (1599–1671)

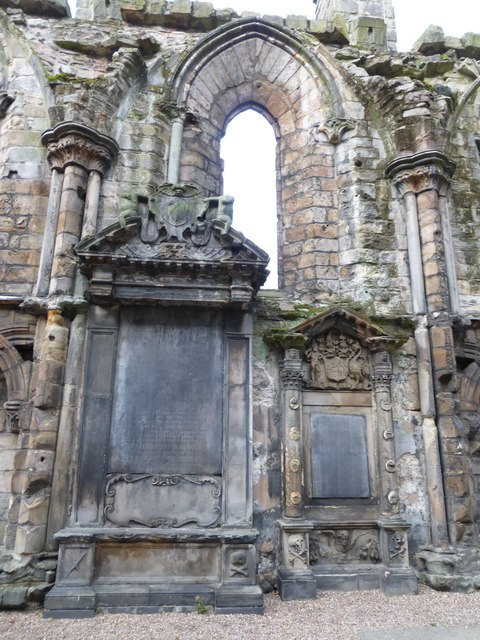
Bishop Wishart Monument (left), Holyrood Abbey.

George Wishart (1599–1671) was a bishop of the Church of Scotland and an author. He was a strong supporter of Episcopacy as a proper form of church governance.

== Life ==
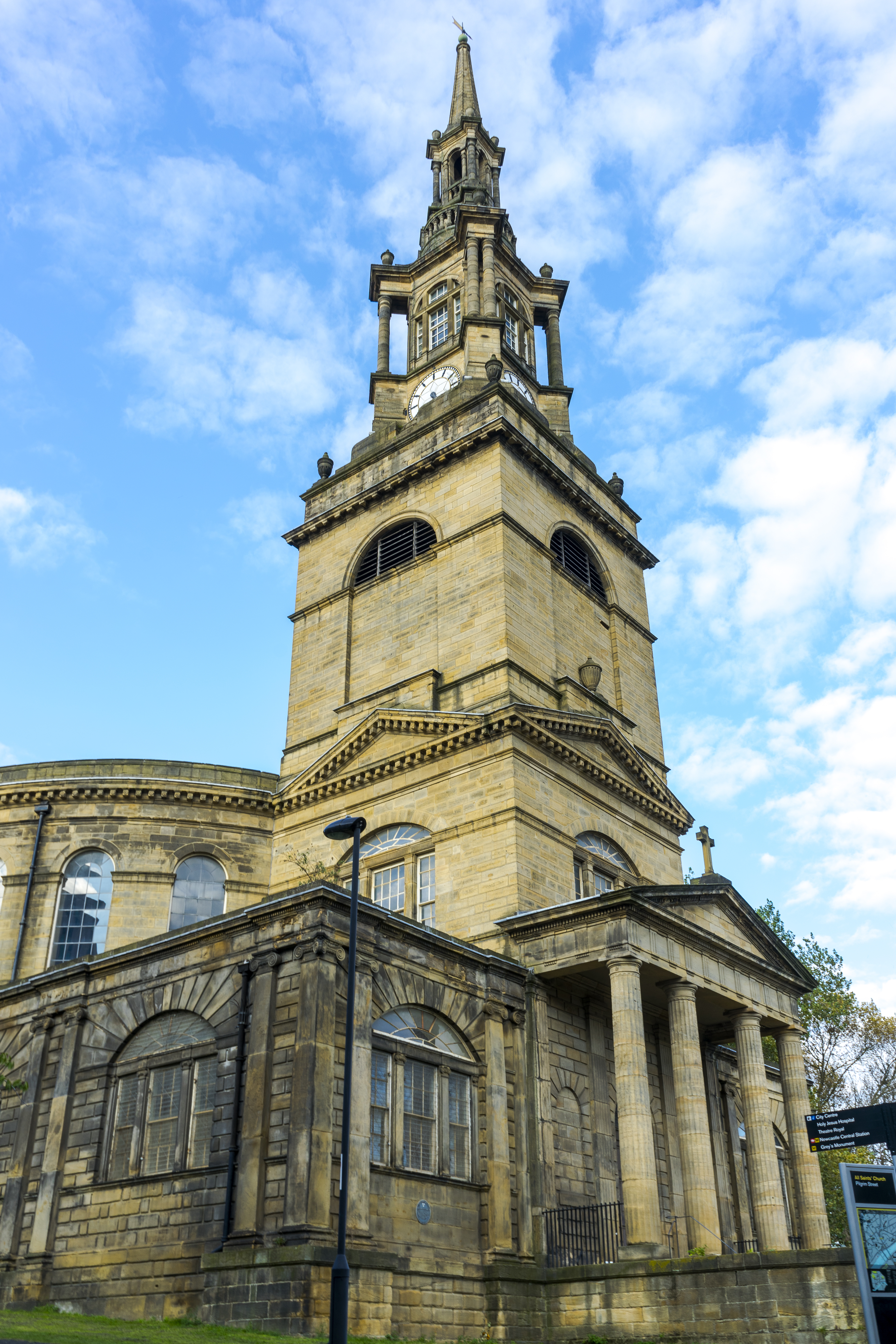
All Saints Church, Newcastle Upon Tyne

Wishart was born in Haddington, the younger son of John Wishart of Logie-Wishart near Forfar, and grandson of Sir John Wishart of Wishart.

He was educated at the University of Edinburgh graduating MA around 1615 and possibly also studying at St Andrews University and on the Continent. He was appointed minister at Monifieth in August 1624, and then moved to "second charge" in St Andrews in April 1626. Here he befriended James Graham, 1st Marquess of Montrose who was a student in St Andrews at that time. In 1634 St Andrews University awarded him a Doctor of Divinity.

He was briefly minister of North Leith Parish Church, being appointed in 1638, but was deposed for his refusal to sign the Covenant.

A strong supporter of episcopacy, he fled to England in 1639, and in Scotland, he was officially deposed for abandoning his duties and "immorality". In England he received various preferments from Charles I. He lived in Newcastle-upon-Tyne where he became a lecturer at All Saints Church. He played a key part in the defence of Newcastle upon Tyne in October 1644 during the Siege of Newcastle during the English civil war, when the town held out for seven months against the Parliamentary forces, and he was one of the "diehards" who took refuge in the Castle when the town fell. The garrison surrendered after a few days on a promise of mercy, which was kept. Whilst most of the garrison were allowed to depart, Wishart was imprisoned in the "Thieves Hole" at Edinburgh Tolbooth for his exploits with the James Graham, Marquess of Montrose, whose devoted champion and personal friend he was, and of whom he wrote a laudatory biography, published in the Netherlands in 1647. The book was so hostile to Montrose's opponents that the Royalists made half-hearted efforts to suppress it as being too inflammatory. He was freed after the Battle of Kilsyth. He played no part in Montrose's final campaign. In 1650 Montrose was executed with a copy of Wishart's biography tied around his neck.

Little is known of his life in the decade after Montrose's death, but he is thought to have spent some time in the Netherlands, and completed a second volume of the Montrose biography. After the Restoration he became the vicar of St Andrew's Church, Newcastle upon Tyne. On 3 June 1662 he was consecrated as Bishop of Edinburgh. He died on 26 July 1671 and was buried at Holyrood Abbey.

Little seems to be recorded about his character or personality, apart from his obvious devotion to his friend Montrose. Accusations about his drunkenness and profanity, which were made by his political opponents, cannot be verified.

== Family ==
He married Margaret Ogilvy and they had at least nine children, three of whom died young. His daughter Jean married Rev William Walker, minister of North Berwick.

== Publications ==
- Memoirs of Montrose (in Latin, 1644, English translation 1652)

== Notes ==
Church of Scotland titles
Preceded by See abolished	Bishop of Edinburgh; 1662 –1671	Succeeded by Alexander Young
