= John M'Gilligen =

17th c. parish minister

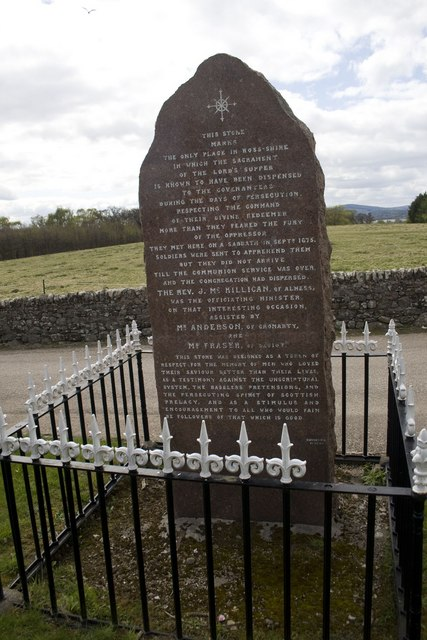
- Dalmore Conventicle Stone, Alness (transcription below)

Personal details
- Died: 8 June 1689
- Denomination: Presbyterian

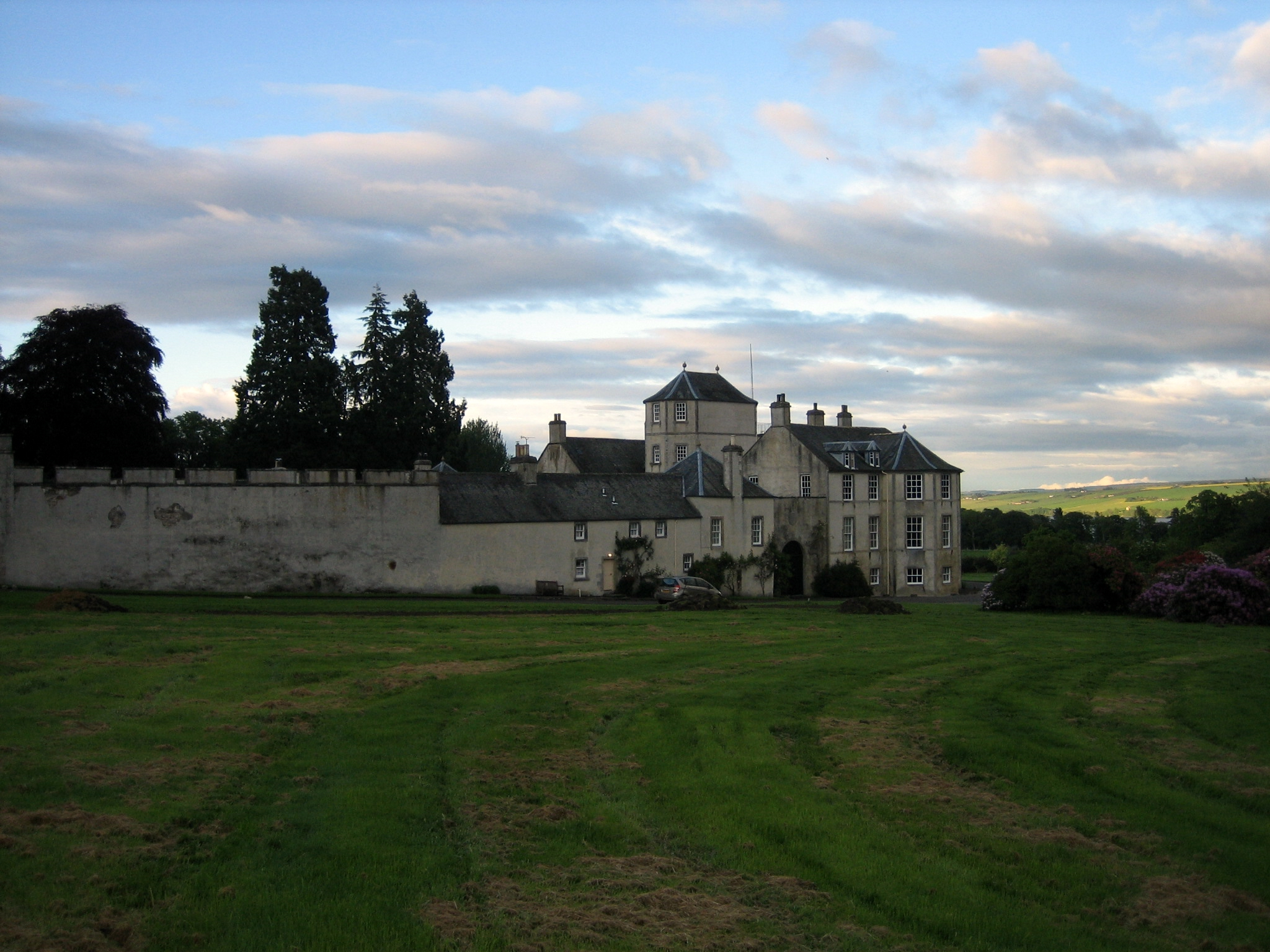
Foulis Castle

John M'Gilligen was a 17th-century Presbyterian minister. He resisted the demands of the Episcopalian authorities and was imprisoned on the Bass Rock. His name is sometimes also spelled as John MacKilligen or John M'Killican or John MacKillican or even John M'Gilligine.

== Early life and ordination ==
John M'Gilligen was minister of Fodderty which Anderson describes as "a parish lying partly in Ross-shire and partly in the shire of Cromarty, chiefly in the beautiful and arable vale of Strathpeffer, west from Dingwall."

He was licensed by the Presbytery of Aberdeen and received by the Presbytery of Forres 28 March 1655. He was called to North of Ireland and to Islay but did not go.

He was admitted to Fodderty 26 February 1656. Having been admitted to that charge, subsequent to 1649, M'Gilligen came under the Act of 1662 which required that he should anew seek presentation from his patron and collation from the Bishop of the diocese, or be ejected. With the terms of this Act he refused to comply; and, accordingly, ejectment followed as he was deprived by Act of Parliament 11 June and Decreet of Privy Council 1 October 1662. He was, moreover, deposed by the Bishop of Ross from the office of the holy ministry, on 31 May 1663, which farcical act (Dickson says) M'Gilligen treated with contempt. Leaving Fodderty, he went to Alness and dwelt in his own private house, from whence he made itineraries for the purpose of holding conventicles. His success was so marked, that the Bishop, mortified, threatened to add to the sentence of deposition, that of excommunication. But M'Gilligen cared as little for the one as for the other.

Complaints were lodged against him in 1667 for holding conventicles with Thomas Hog of Kiltearn. In 1668 complaints were lodged against him by the Bishop of Moray, in consequence of which he was imprisoned in the Tolbooth of Forres. After his release he returned to Alness. He was again summoned – on 10 July 1674 – before the Privy Council to answer a charge, preferred against him, for holding conventicles. Failing to attend, they denounced him as one of His Majesty's rebels and pronounced sentence of outlawry against him. Still M'Gilligen continued to preach; and, even on one occasion, in September, 1675, dispensed the Sacrament of the Lord's Supper in the house of the Lady Dowager of Fowlis at Obsdale.

Early in the following year, his enemies laid hands on him and took him to Fortrose. The speech he gave is recorded in Anderson and by Wodrow. After lying for some time in the tolbooth of Fortrose, he was, by an act of the Privy Council, 11 October 1676, ordered to be transported via Nairn till he reached Edinburgh, where he was to be imprisoned. He was sentenced to the "limbo" of the Bass Rock, where he remained for nearly two full years from (1677 – 19 July 1679; and, again 28 July 1683 – 27 July 1686) No-one was allowed to do menial tasks for him but, at length, he was permitted sometimes to walk upon the rock, through the influence of Sir George Mackenzie of Tarbet which pleased him greatly. He had indemnity granted 11 July 1679, when he was liberated.

M'Gilligen immediately resumed the work of preaching which he carried on, without much molestation, until 1682. Then the Privy Council — being informed that he had "relapsed into his former guilt in keeping conventicles, disorderly baptisms, and marriages, to the endangering of the peace of the country where he lives " - instituted new proceedings against him. Refusing to depone on oath to the truth of these charges, he was sentenced to pay a fine of five thousand merks and to be imprisoned until the fine was paid.

He was again summoned before the Privy Council 18 January 1683, and fined £277, to remain in prison till paid. After six months' imprisonment at Edinburgh he was sent to the Bass for a second time, by an Act of Council, dated 28 July 1683.

Some pages of M'Gilligen's diary on the Bass are recorded by Wodrow and Anderson.

Here he remained until 27 July 1686, when a dangerous illness, which threatened to prove fatal, necessitated his being set at liberty. On being released under bond he went home to Alness.

== After Toleration ==
After Toleration had been given to the Presbyterians, 5 July 1687, he built a meeting-house on his own property with the money he received for the damage done to his property by the party of soldiers sent by Sir Roderick Mackenzie of Findon in 1675 to prevent the celebration of the communion at Obsdale. He received a call from Elgin which he declined, and accepted a call to Inverness, but he was not settled there. He died 8 June 1689 and was buried at Inverness.

== Family ==
He married Catherine, daughter of John Munro of Balchraggan, and had children: John, minister of Lochalsh; Daniel, minister of Alness; Janet (married Alexander Munro of Kilchoan), and four others. His second wife was Margaret, third daughter of Donald Mackenzie of Meddat, who survived him.

== Legacy ==
The Dalmore Conventicle Stone has the following inscription:

This stone marks the only place in Ross-shire in which the sacrament of the Lord's Supper is known to have been dispensed to the covenanters during the days of persecution. Respecting the command of their divine redeemer more than they feared the fury of the oppressor they met here on a Sabbath in September 1675. Soldiers were sent to apprehend them but they did not arrive till the communion service was over and the congregation had dispersed. The Rev J. McKilligan of Alness was the officiating minister on that interesting occasion assisted by Mr Anderson of Cromarty and Mr Fraser of Daviot. This stone was designed as a token of respect for the memory of men who loved their Saviour better than their lives. As a testimony against the unscriptural system, the baseless pretensions, and the persecuting spirit of the Scottish Prelacy. And as a stimulus and encouragement to all who would fain be followers of that which is good.

Three generations of the Mackilligen family have been written about in the historical fiction novel Across the Deep. The novel follows John and also William McKillican (Canadian pastor) and Jennie McKillican (missionary nurse to China during the Boxer Rebellion).

== Bibliography ==
- Wodrow's Hist., iii., 435
- The Bass Rock, 235-59
- Inq. Ret. Ross, 151.
