= William Wishart (primus) =

Principal of Edinburgh University

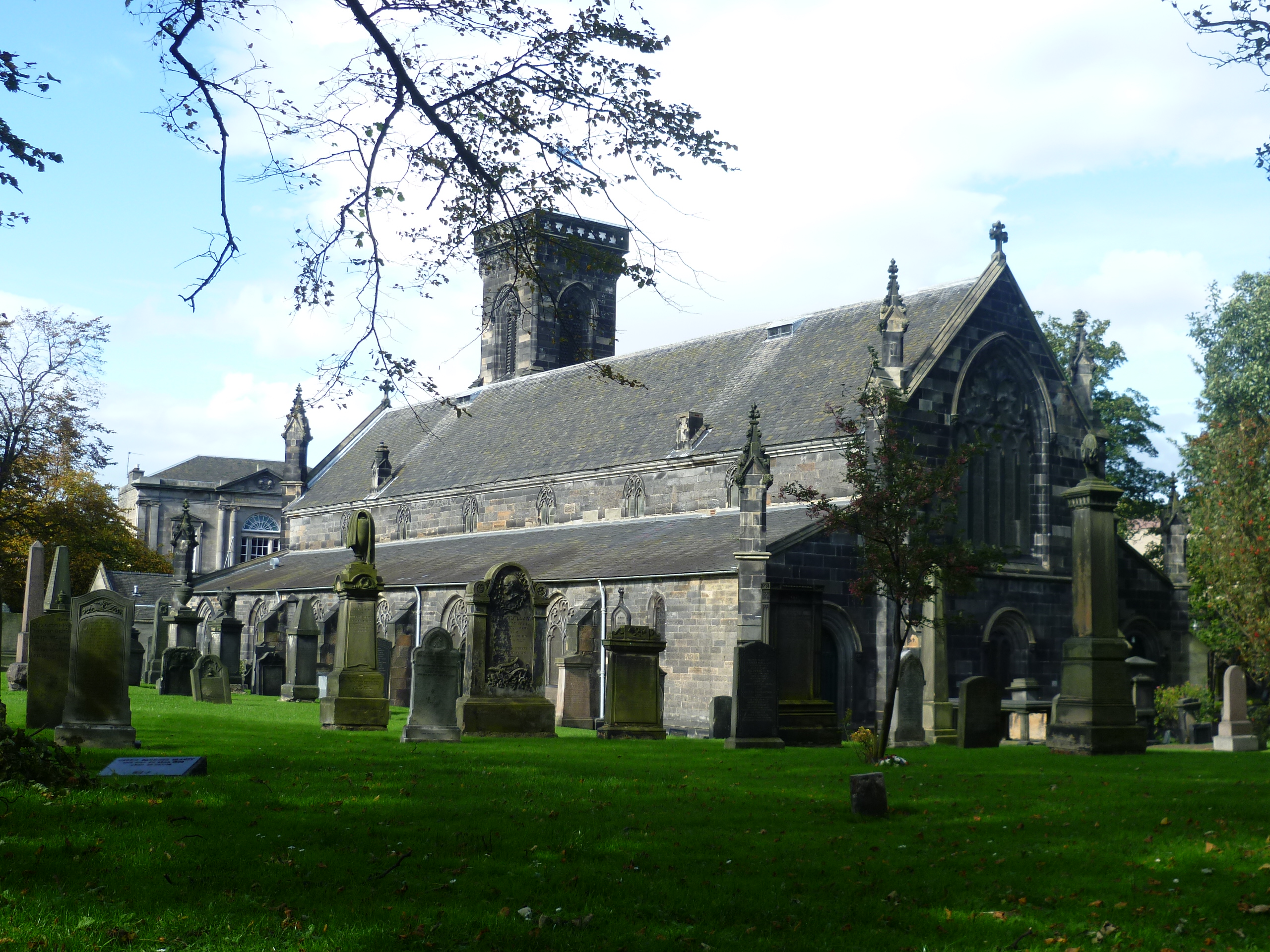
South Leith Church

William Wishart (1660–1729) was a Church of Scotland minister and the Principal of the University of Edinburgh from 1716 to 1728. He is not to be confused with his son William Wishart (secundus), who was subsequently the Principal of the University of Edinburgh from 1736 to 1754.

== Life ==
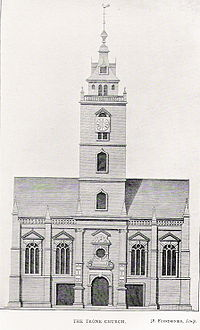
Engraving of the kirk as it looked before 1785

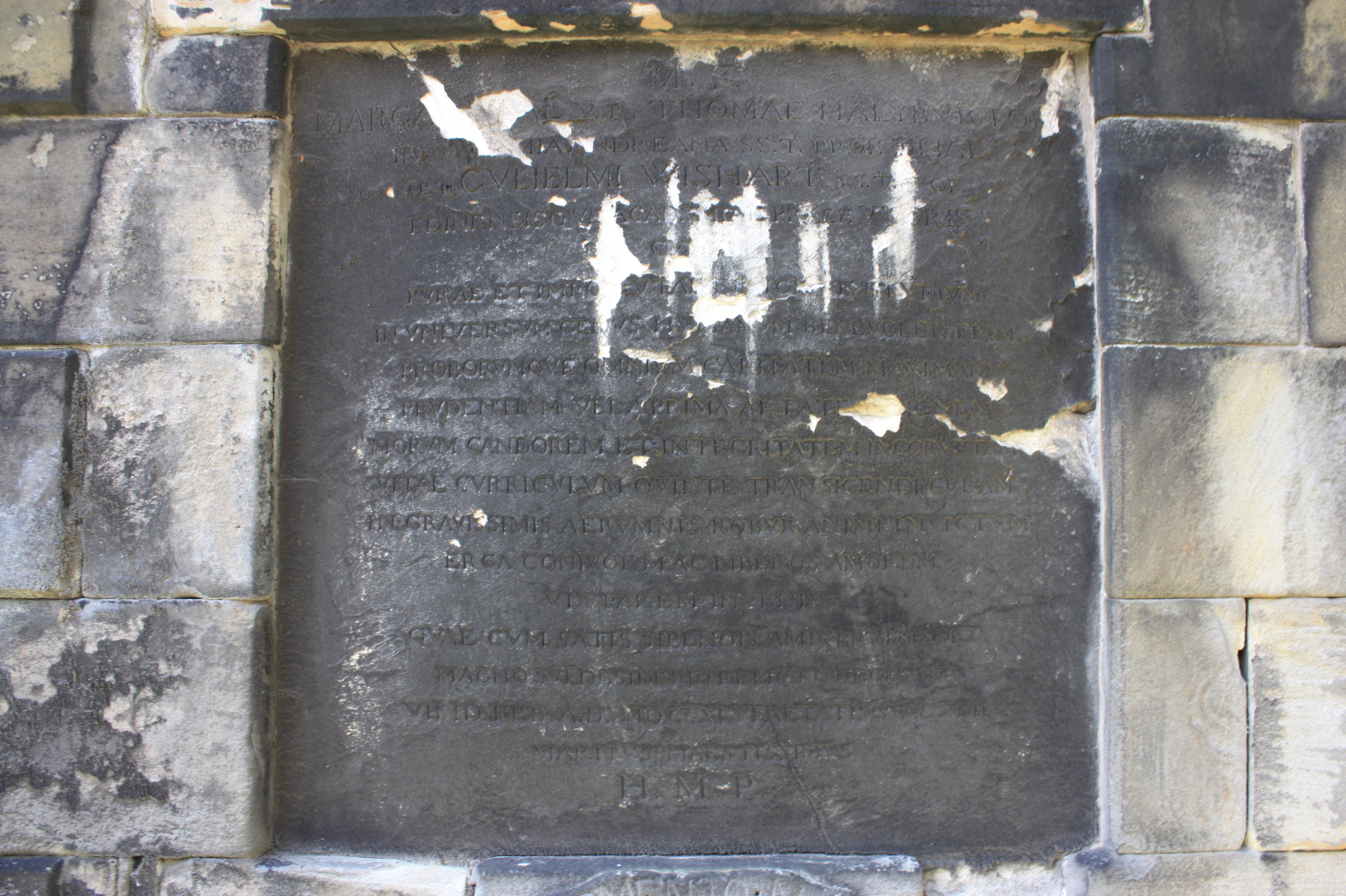
The grave of Rev William Wishart, Greyfriars Kirkyard (Covenanters Prison)

He was born the son of Rev William Wishart (1621–1692), minister of Kinneil and his wife Christian Burne, Daughter of Richard Burne of Linlithgow. He was the grandson of Sir John Wishart (1570-1607) and Jean (Douglas) Wishart, the daughter of William Douglas, 9th Earl of Angus and his wife, Agnes Keith, daughter of William Keith, 3rd Earl Marischal. His brothers included Admiral Sir James Wishart and Sir George Wishart of Cliftonhall.

William was privately tutored, then studied divinity at the University of Edinburgh, graduating MA in 1680. He did further studies at the University of Utrecht and returned to Scotland in 1684. He was imprisoned as a Covenanter but released the following year. In January 1688 he was ordained as minister of a Presbyterian meeting house (known as the John Knox Church) on Sheriff Brae in Leith in place of Rev John Knox who had been banished to New Jersey as a slave on a plantation. In 1692 he received patronage to become minister of South Leith Parish Church. He was minister of South Leith for his first term as Moderator in 1706.

In September 1707 he was translated to be minister of the Tron Kirk on the Royal Mile in Edinburgh in place of the Very Rev William Crichton who retired due to age (77).

He was five times Moderator of the General Assembly of the Church of Scotland: 1706, 1713, 1718, 1724 and 1728.

He received an honorary Doctor of Divinity (DD) from the University of Edinburgh in 1728.

He died on 11 June 1729. His position at the Tron was filled by his son George. He is buried in the section of Greyfriars Kirkyard known as the "Covenanters Prison" (rarely open to public).

== Publications ==
- Theologia, or Discourses on God (1702)
- A Discourse of Suppressing Vice (1702)

== Family ==
He was married to Janet Murray (died 1744) daughter of Major William Murray of Touchadam, the son of Sir William Murray of Touchadam and Polmaise, and of Janet, daughter of Sir William Nisbet of Dean (1569-1639). Their children included Rev William Wishart who succeeded him as minister of the Tron Kirk and Rev George Wishart (1703–1785), Moderator of the General Assembly of the Church of Scotland in 1748.

He was probably the grandson of Rev William Wishart of South Leith who called for the execution of Marion Mure for witchcraft in 1632, the trial overseen by William Struthers of St Giles.

== Notes ==
Preceded by William Carstares	Principals of Edinburgh University; 1716–1728	Succeeded by William Hamilton
