= Cramond Kirk =

Church in Edinburgh, Scotland

Coordinates: 55.9777°N 3.3000°W

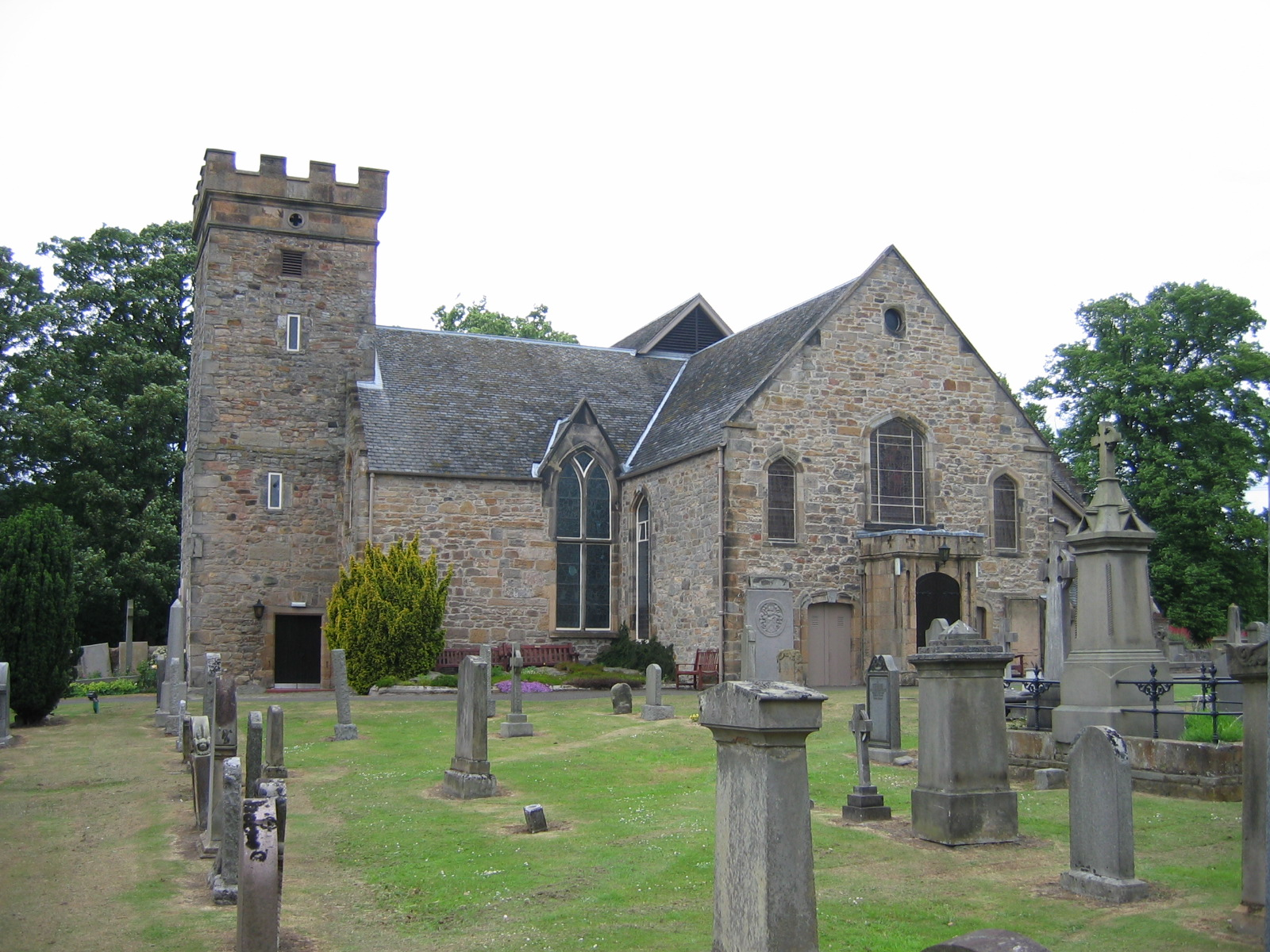
Cramond Kirk

Cramond Kirk is a church situated in the middle area Cramond parish, in the north west of Edinburgh, Scotland. Built on the site of an old Roman fort, parts of the Cramond Kirk building date back to the fourteenth century and the church tower is considered to be the oldest part.

Next door to the Kirk there is the Manse which has been a home for the Minister of Cramond Kirk for centuries. The existing Manse was constructed in three parts, as extensions were needed to the original building.

== History ==
The pre-Reformation church was dedicated to St Columba and fell under the control of the Bishop of Dunkeld rather than the much closer religious centres of Holyrood Abbey or St Cuthberts (both in Edinburgh).

The existing church mainly dates from 1656 but incorporates a 15th-century tower and stands on the site of a medieval church which had become ruinous by 1500. It was used from 1573 onwards. However, it is noteworthy that the said medieval church stood on the site of the temple within the former Roman fort at Cramond. The latter (probably built around 100AD) was abandoned by the Romans around 300AD, however, all evidence would point to the Roman structure surviving and being rededicated to Christian worship at some point. Although not having a claim to "continuous use for Christian worship" it has had broken use as a place of worship for 1900 years making it one of the most significant religious sites in Scotland.

The church was enlarged in 1701, partly to incorporate the Barnton burial vault to the east. A castellated entrance porch was added in 1811 and a major remodelling was undertaken in 1828 by Edinburgh architect William Burn. A further remodelling took place in 1851 by David Bryce. In 1911 the church was lengthened and most of the internal structures of galleries etc. were rebuilt.

== Ministers ==
- 1573 to 1575 - William Cornwall, reader
- 1575 to 1577 - George Lundie
- 1580 to 1581 - John Spottiswood
- 1582 to 1590 - Patrick Simson
- 1592 to 1631 - Michael Cranstoun, involved in the Union of the Crowns 1606
- 1631 to 1632 - William King MA (d.1632)
- 1635 to 1639 - William Colvill MA, translated to Trinity College Church
- 1639 to 1662 - William Dalgleish (1599-1676)
- 1663 (briefly) - John Hamilton of Blair MA translated to South Leith Parish Church
- 1664 to 1666 - Alexander Young translated to St Andrews, Bishop of Edinburgh in 1671
- 1666 to 1674 - David Falconer MA, later Professor of Divinity at the University of St Andrews
- 1675 to 1689 - John Somervill(e) (d.1692)
- 1689 to 1692 - John Hamilton MA
- 1694 to 1709 - William Hamilton became Professor of Divinity then Principal of the University of Edinburgh
- 1712 to 1730 - James Smith, translated to New North (St Giles) in 1730 and Moderator for that year
- 1731 to 1736 - Robert Hamilton
- 1737 to 1772 - Gilbert Hamilton DD Moderator in 1768
- 1773 to 1776 - Charles Stuart of Dunearn (1745-1826) son of the Lord Provost James Stuart of Binend and Dunearn
- 1776 to 1784 - Robert Walker
- 1785 to 1816 - Archibald Bonar
- 1816 to 1843 - George Muirhead DD (d.1847) left to join the Free Church of Scotland (as its oldest member)
- 1843 to 1877 - Walter Laidlaw Colvin DD (1812-1877)
- 1878 to 1887 - George Wilson
- 1884 to 1889 - John Webster DD (1827-1903) resigned
- 1890 to 1896 - Thomas Martin MA
- 1896 to 1907 - Alexander Miller MacLean
- 1907 to 1909 - James Alexander Milne (1869-1909)
- 1909 to ? - George Gordon Stott
- 1957 to 1992 - Campbell Mackenzie Maclean (1922-2000)
