= James Hamilton (physician, born 1749) =

Scottish physician (1749–1835)

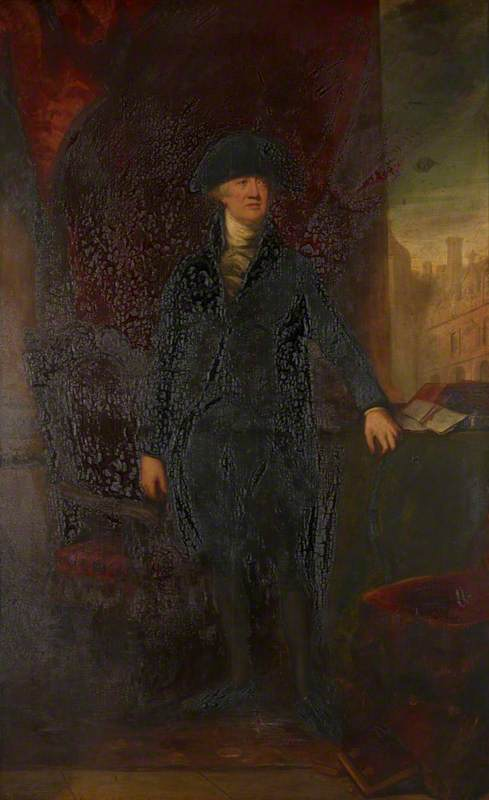
- Born: 1749; Edinburgh
- Died: 27 October 1835 (aged 85–86)
- Occupation: Physician
- Father: Robert Hamilton

James Hamilton (1749–27 October 1835) was a Scottish physician.

== Biography ==
Hamilton was the son of Robert Hamilton, a professor of divinity at Edinburgh. He was born in Edinburgh in 1749, and studied medicine there and on the continent. Early on, he became a physician at the Royal Infirmary, George Heriot's Hospital, and other hospitals in Edinburgh, and had a large practice. He died in Edinburgh on 27 October 1835. For many years, he was a picturesque figure in the city, retaining very old-fashioned manners and dress; he is said to have been the last person who wore the three-cornered cocked hat. He was most noted for his work entitled 'Observations on the Utility and Administration of Purgative Medicines,' 1805; 8th edit. 1826. Numerous American editions were also published, and it was translated into Italian, German, and French. Hamilton was thoroughly old-fashioned in his treatment, believing in free blood-letting and profuse purging, and strong mercurial treatment for syphilis. He was very jocular, kind-hearted, and athletic. There are amusing accounts of him in the 'Lives' of Sir Astley Cooper and Sir Robert Christison, and John Kay's 'Edinburgh Portraits.' The works of three James Hamiltons were previously catalogued as by one man in the 'British Museum Catalogue:' (1) the above-mentioned, always known as James Hamilton, senior; (2) James Hamilton, junior, who lived next door to him in St. Andrew's Square, Edinburgh; and (3) James Hamilton, M.D. (1740–1827), successively of Dunbar, Edinburgh, Leeds, and London, a friend of John Wesley, who is depicted with him in a well-known print by Kay.
