= History of the Scottish Greens =

Aspect of Scottish political history

The Scottish Greens is a centre-left to left-wing green political party in Scotland that was founded in 1990. The party has its roots in the PEOPLE Party started in Coventry in 1973. That party then changed its name to the more descriptive Ecology Party in 1975, and to the Green Party ten years later. In 1978, the party's Scottish branch was founded in Edinburgh by Leslie Spoor.

In 1990, the Scottish and Northern Ireland wings of the Green Party in the United Kingdom decided to separate amicably from the party in England and Wales, to form the Scottish Green Party and the Green Party in Northern Ireland. The party entered the country's devolved legislature since the 1999 Scottish parliament election with the election of Robin Harper as its first MSP. With the Bute House Agreement in 2021, the party entered government for the first time, with co-leaders Patrick Harvie and Lorna Slater appointed government ministers.

== Origins in the Ecology Party (1978–1989) ==
The Scottish Green Party was founded in 1978 by Leslie Spoor as the Scottish branch of the Ecology Party, later renamed the Green Party.

== Split from the UK Green Party (1989–1999) ==
On 22 September 1989, a poll of the membership of the resulted in 75% of those voting favouring separation from the larger Green Party, with a turnout of 28% – the decision took effect the following year on 23 September 1990.

The separation was entirely amicable, as part of the green commitment to decentralisation. The predecessor party opposed Britain's entry into the European Common Market in its 1989 European election manifesto, claiming that the Common Market would cause mass unemployment for Scottish workers, force Scotland to move towards a tourist-based economy, enable the destruction of local food markets and cause catastrophic environmental damage. Instead, it campaigned for a Europe-wide confederation of individuals on global issues affecting the environment.

The 1990 Highland Regional Council election gave the Greens their first ever councillor in the UK. Roger (aka Rory) Winter, representing the Highland Green Party (Known in Scottish Gaelic as Uainich na Gàidhealtachd), was elected in Nairn. However, Cllr Winter broke away from the Greens in 1991 and continued his four-year term as an Independent Green Highlander.

In 1997, the Green parties of the United Kingdom were described as "stunningly unsuccessful" as despite the strength of the environmental movement, and their status as the oldest green parties in Europe, they had as yet no electoral success.

== First electoral successes (1999–2007) ==
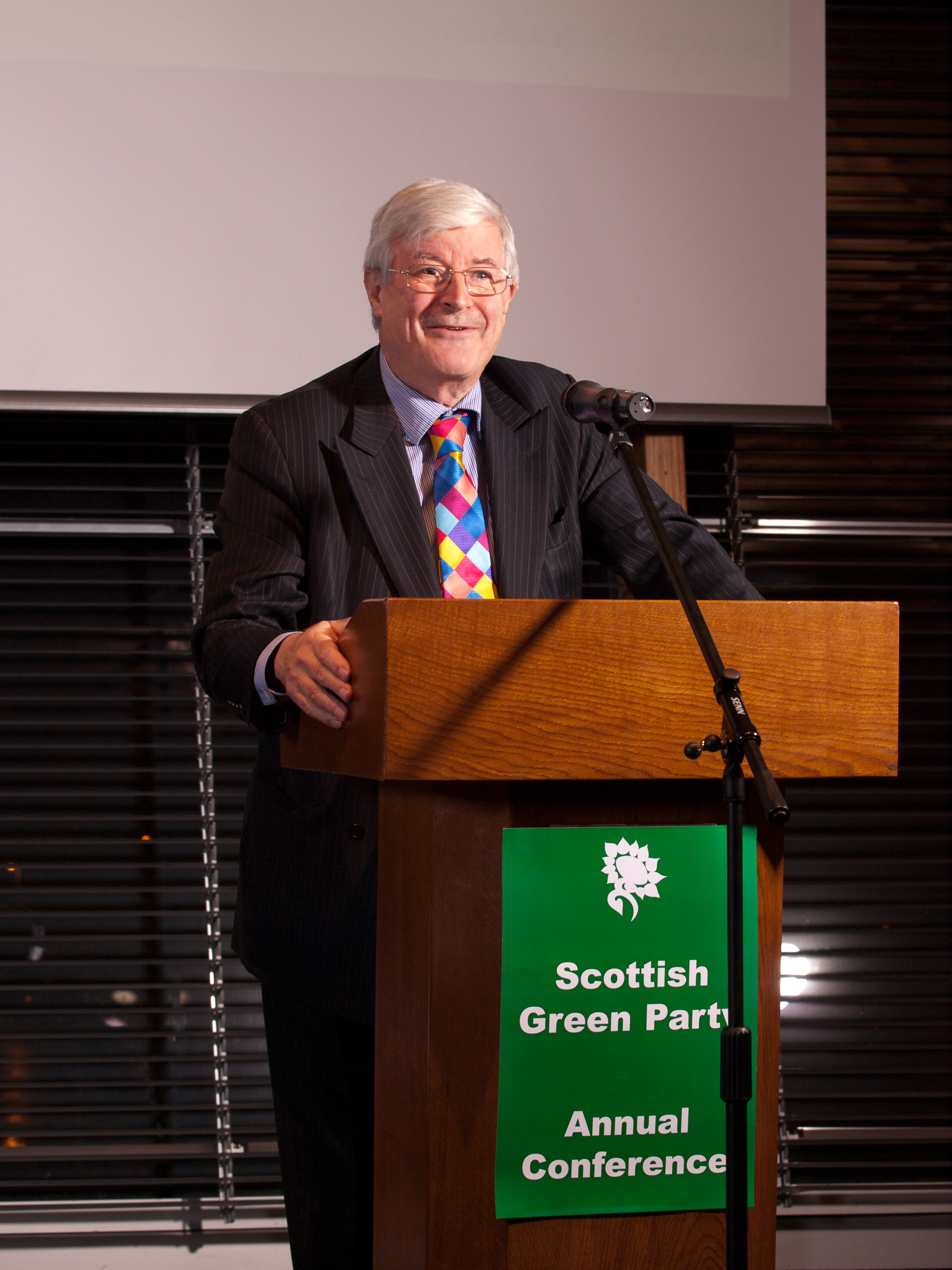
Robin Harper addresses party conference his final party conference as a MSP, 2010

The Scottish Green Party has its most prominent presence in the Scottish Parliament, which is elected using the additional member system of proportional representation. In the first election to this Parliament, in 1999, the Scottish Green Party got one Member of the Scottish Parliament (MSP) elected by proportional representation, Robin Harper, the UK's first elected Green parliamentarian (George MacLeod had previously represented the UK Green Party in the House of Lords).

In the 2003 Scottish Parliament election, the Scottish Greens added six new MSPs to their previous total. The result was a surprise for the party, with newly elected MSP, and party election co-ordinator credited the 'Second Vote Green' message, lack of confidence in the SNP, and Harper's leadership. However, the party was still small, with its 2001 conference attracting just 35 members. In the Scottish Parliament's post-election briefing, political scientist John Curtice warned that the focus on the 'Second Vote Green' strategy made the party's vote fragile, and depended on voters seeing the election as unimportant.

Afterwards, Harper stood for election for First Minister, securing six votes.

We had very little money, few activists outside Edinburgh and Glasgow, a tiny and damp national office, two paid staff members, and generally had to beg or borrow resources (including sometimes having to rely on the WiFi from the Pub across the road to send press releases)

— then MSP Mark Ballard, speaking about the party's 2003 election campaign

In the European Parliament election of 2004, it polled 6.8% of the vote and did not return any MEPs.

In February 2005, the party announced plans to field candidates in 19 seats in the 2005 Westminster elections. At the election, the party contested 19 seats and polled 25,760 votes, however they returned no MPs. Its highest share of the vote was 7.7% of the vote in Glasgow North.

At the party's 2005 conference, a motion passed to support Scottish independence.

== Increased influence of the Government (2007–2014) ==
=== 2007 Scottish Parliament election ===
Heading into the election, the party felt confident. At its 2005 conference, then co-convenors Harper and Baird said the party had emerged as a "major new force in politics" and that they expected to hold the balance of power in the next Parliament, as well as elect councillors for the first time.

At the start of 2007, polls indicated that the party would replicate its 2003 Scottish Parliament election result and re-elect 7 MSPs. However, polls later narrowed, with one suggesting the party would only retain a single MSP. Despite polls narrowing internally, Eddie Barnes suggested that the party remained confident, planning to be a king-maker and influence government from the outside.

In the 2007 Scottish Parliament election, the party lost five seats in Holyrood, leaving the party with just 2 MSPs. However, in the council elections, taking place under the new Single Transferable Vote voting system, they gained three Councillors on the City of Edinburgh Council and five Councillors on Glasgow City Council.

Co-convenor Robin Harper blamed the loss on spoilt ballot papers and the campaign focusing on larger parties. This analysis was shared among the other smaller parties that lost out. Other commentators noted controversial policies in the manifesto such as integrating religious schools into nondenominational schools and the campaign's increased focus on Labour and the SNP.

=== Supporters of the first SNP government ===
Despite the loss of MSPs, the party gained influence with the new SNP government. On 11 May, the Greens signed an agreement with the Scottish National Party (SNP), which meant that the Greens voted for Alex Salmond as First Minister and supported his initial Ministerial appointments. In return, the SNP backed a climate change bill as an early measure and promised to legislate against ship-to-ship oil transfers in the Firth of Forth. The SNP also agreed to nominate Patrick Harvie, one of the Green MSPs, to convene the Scottish Parliament Committee on Transport, Infrastructure and Climate Change.

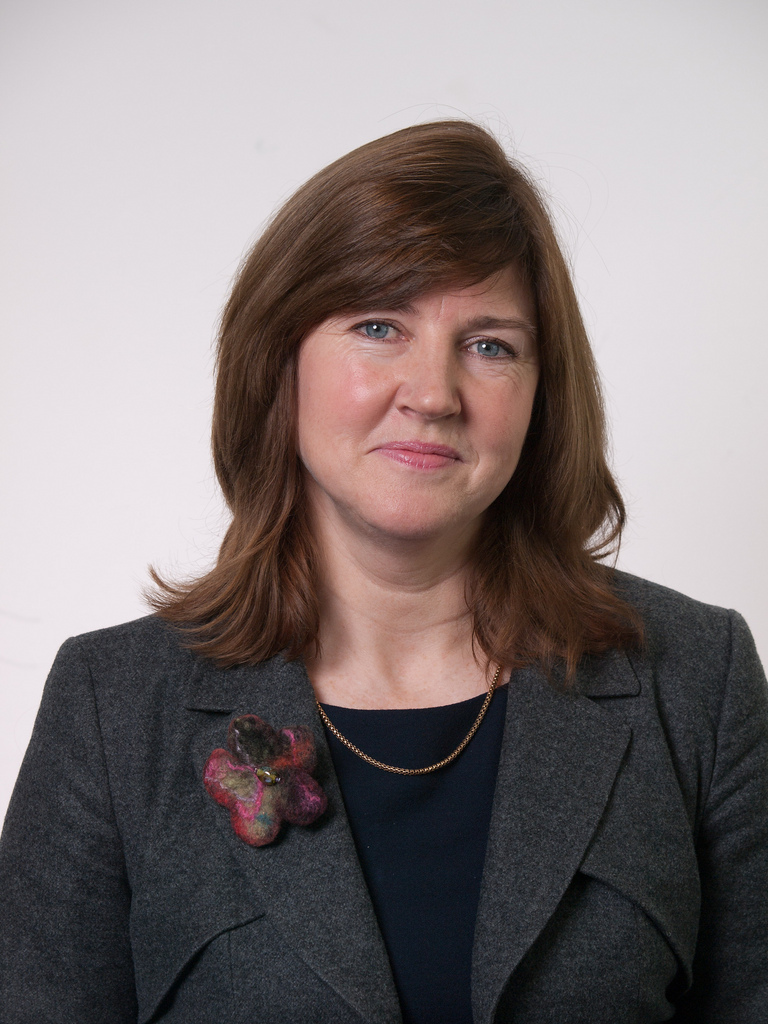
Johnstone, was female co-convenor between 2007-2008

Differences, primarily over transport policy, were cited for the limited nature of the agreement. But they left open the door to further negotiations should the Scottish Liberal Democrats join the First Salmond government.

Given the present situation that (the SNP) are going to be forming a minority government, it really didn't seem to make sense for us to tie ourselves closely into confidence and supply or into coalition, because we have serious reservations about many SNP policies, particularly their transport policies

— then MSP Robin Harper, speaking to BBC Scotland.

During the election, co-convenor Shiona Baird lost her seat, and did not re-stand for election as co-convenor. She was replaced by then Edinburgh councillor Alison Johnstone in November 2007.

Robin Harper and Johnstone did not seek re-election in 2008 as co-convenor. While Harvie was the sole nominee for the male co-convenor, there was 3 candidates for female co-convenor: former MSP Eleanor Scott, Glasgow councillor Nina Baker and Edinburgh councillor Maggie Chapman. The role of female co-convenor was won by Scott.

=== 2009 Scottish budget negotiations ===
During the 2009 Scottish budget process, the Scottish Greens demanded an £1 billion home insulation programme over 10 years. The SNP Scottish Government offered £22 million for a 'pilot' project. The party then demanded a £33 million pilot for their backing of the budget, which the SNP refused.

On 28 January 2009, the two Green MSPs were instrumental in the defeat of the Government's budget. The party's co-convenor Patrick Harvie blamed this on the government's funding proposal for the pilot being "too vague" on whether it would be "new money" or from pre-existing local authority budgets. The move surprised some commentators, whose leadership had until this point been marked with increased cooperation with the SNP government.

A slightly amended version of the budget was passed easily the following week with the support of other parties

=== Campaigning against Donald Trump ===
On 31 May 2009, Cllr Martin Ford, formerly a Liberal Democrat, joined the Scottish Green Party in protest against the plans by Donald Trump to develop on an important environmental site at Menie.

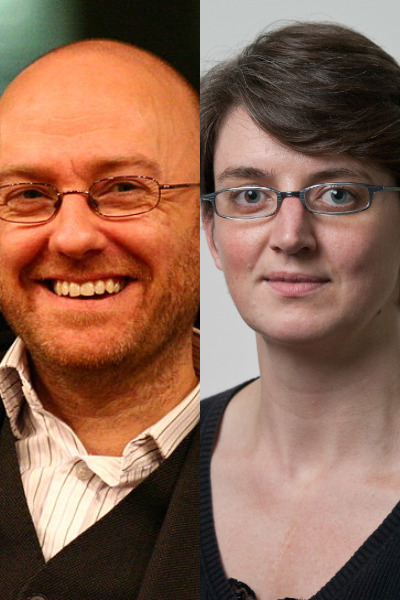
Harvie (left) with Maggie Chapman, co-convenors of the party between 2014 and 2018.

On 13 October 2009, he was joined by fellow former Liberal Democrat Cllr Debra Storr. Both Councillors continued to serve on Aberdeenshire Council as members of the Democratic Independent group. At the 2012 Scottish local elections Councillor Debra Storr stood down to concentrate on her professional career. Councillor Martin Ford was re-elected, this time standing as a Scottish Green Party candidate.

=== 2011 Scottish parliament election ===
At the party's 2010 conference, Robin Harper announced that he would not seek re-election in the 2011 Scottish Parliament election. He was succeeded as Lothians lead candidate by Edinburgh councillor Alison Johnstone.

The party's election campaign was launched with a focus on investment into public services paid for by tax raises. There was scepticism in reporting on whether the proposals had been 'fully costed' but Harvie and Johnstone were both considered to be "impressive" candidates During the campaign, Johnstone launched pledges to maintain free tuition fees, invest in graduate jobs in low carbon industry and create a free universal insulation scheme. The scheme was a revival of the party's proposal during the 2009 Scottish budget process.

In the end, the party only elected 2 MSPs in 2011. Some commentators argued that the party's "hard left economic agenda" had distracted from their environmental agenda, losing it votes. Voices from within the party disagreed, considering the lack of gains to come from poor capacity, not policy.

James Dennison notes that, despite not moving forward, the party was the only 'minor' Scottish party which achieved representation in the Scottish Parliament after 2011 when the Scottish Socialist Party, Scottish Senior Citizens Unity Party and others lost seats.

== Independence referendum and rapid growth (2014–2019) ==
=== 2014 Independence referendum ===
In November 2013, Edinburgh councillor Maggie Chapman succeeded Glasgow councillor Martha Wardrop as the party's female co-convenor after she did not seek re-election, while Patrick Harvie was re-elected. Chapman had difficulty being recognised as equal to Harvie in the media, she commented to Common Weal's blog Source that "It's galling when you hear mainstream media, who do know better, referring to Patrick as leader of the party.” Influential party member Peter McColl argued that Chapman's election and subsequent role as lead candidate in the 2014 European Parliament election marked an increased socialist influence on the party.

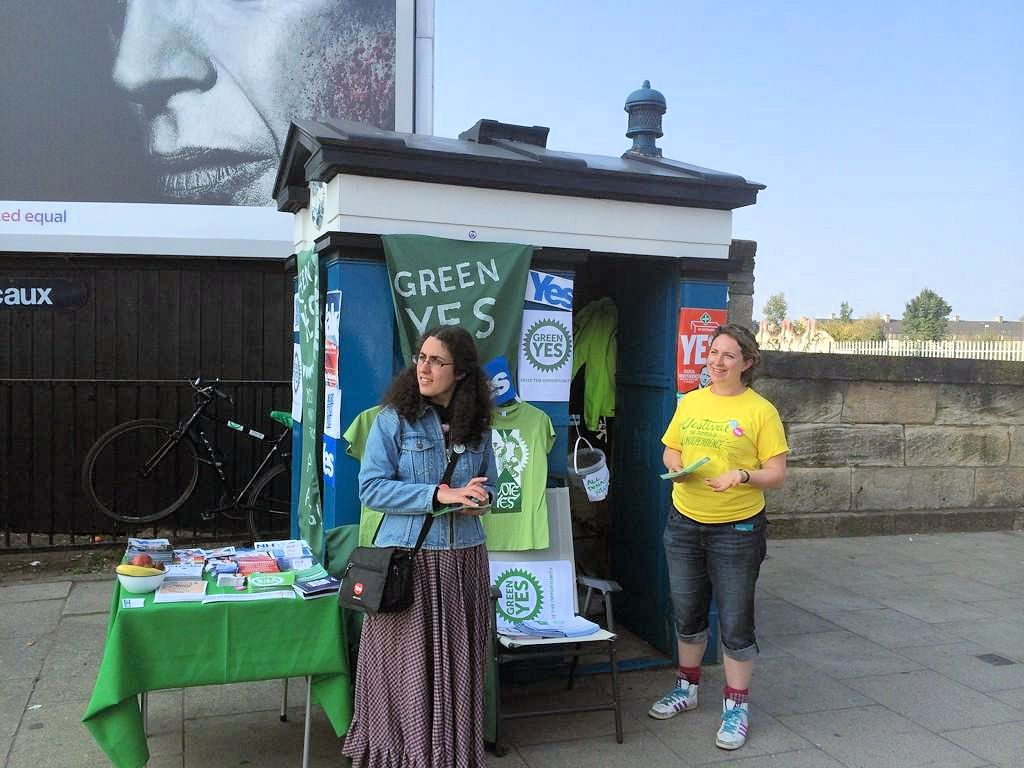
"Green Yes" activists in Edinburgh campaigning for independence, 2014

After the Scottish Government announced the referendum on Scottish independence, a campaign group called Yes Scotland was established to promote a vote for independence. Leading members of the Scottish Green Party actively supported and became involved with the campaign from its foundation, with Patrick Harvie among the members of Yes Scotland's advisory board.

Briefly, the party withdrew from Yes Scotland, due to concerns it was dominated by the SNP, and its acceptance of the pound, monarchy and NATO membership. However, the party's 2012 conference overturned the decision, after the party was convinced that the campaign was no longer the 'puppet' of the SNP. The party also joined the Radical Independence Campaign.

The party's own campaign of 'Green Yes' launched in October 2013, and advocated that only independence could deliver radical change, with Harvie also arguing that the party's vision of independence was progressive, and explicitly not nationalistic. He also argued that devolution did not go far enough to tackle issues important to Scots like austerity.

For me, it's got nothing to do with flags, or 300 years of history; it's about the future. And I think that the best way [...] of changing Scotland

— Patrick Harvie MSP, speaking about the party's vision of independence, New Statesman

However, in December, former convenor Robin Harper said that he would "absolutely vote No" in the independence referendum and offered his backing to the Better Together campaign, putting himself at odds with official party policy and its present leadership. Going on to say that he would like to help the Better Together and that there was a "significant minority" of Greens who were opposed to independence.

Uniquely amongst the parties in the Scottish Parliament, the Scottish Green Party is open about and comfortable with the differences of opinion in the party on the constitutional issue, with co-convenor Patrick Harvie pointing out that "even the very firm supporters of independence within the Greens tend to be more strongly motivated by other aspects of our political agenda." Academic James Dennison argued that after the referendum, the party gained support from independence supporters who "supported independence not as an expression of nationalism but as a route to a fairer society."

=== Impacts of the referendum ===
Membership before and after independence referendum
Year	Membership
2013	1,178
2014	7,800
2015	9,000

After the independence referendum, the Scottish Greens experienced a massive surge in membership, including future co-leader Lorna Slater. The party claimed that, for a period in the day after the referendum, it gained a member every 15 seconds. It led to the party's membership becoming younger, and significantly more female alongside being able to hire more paid staff than ever before. The party's co-convenor Patrick Harvie, became a recognised figure on Scotland's political stage

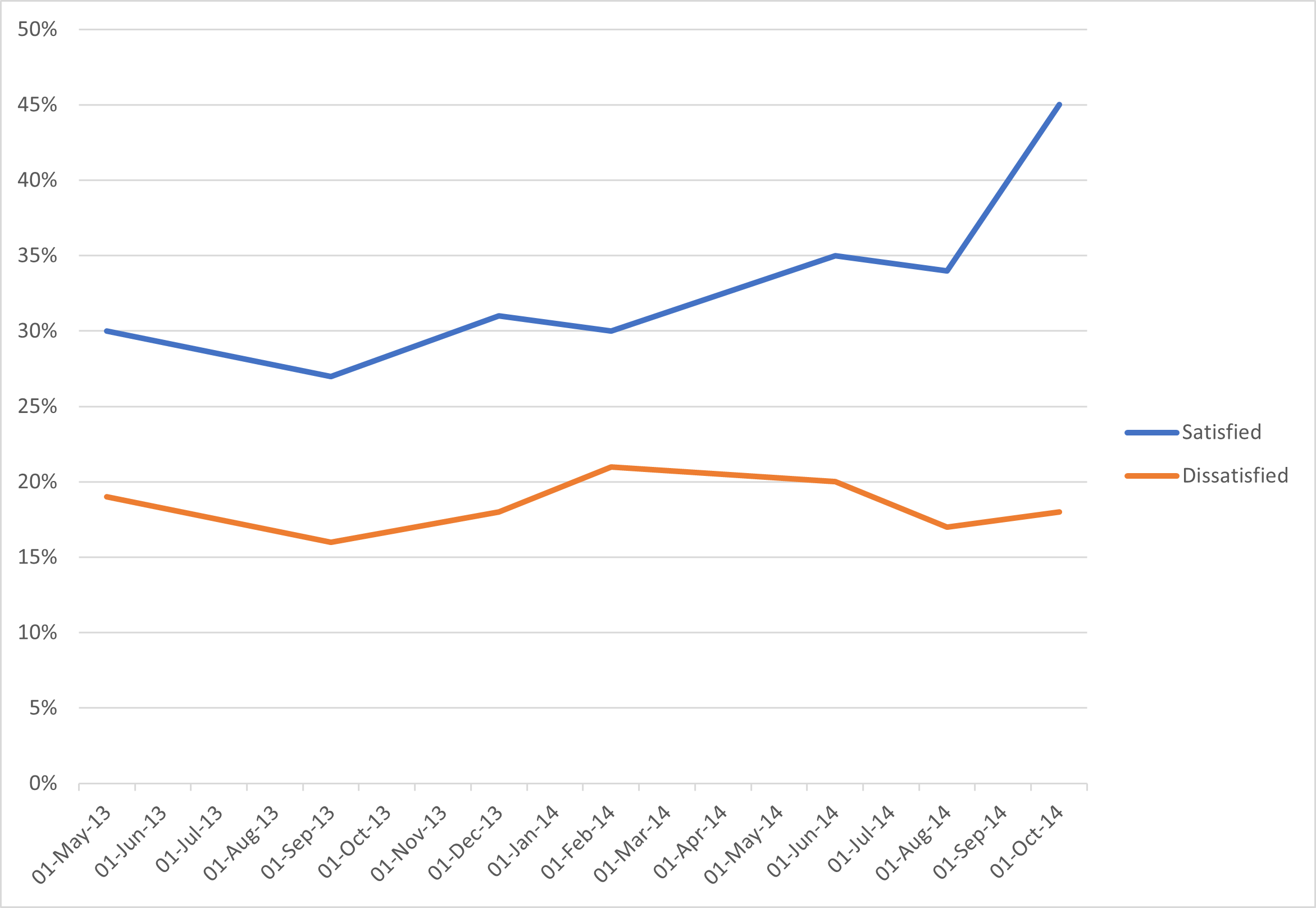
Public satisfaction with Patrick Harvie as co-convenor around referendum, Ipsos

The party's then co-convenors, Harvie and Chapman were chosen by the party to serve as its representatives on the post-referendum Smith Commission with former Scottish Labour First Minister Henry McLeish arguing the party could make 'a strong case' for more devolved powers on the commission. The party argued that full powers on income tax, the bulk of welfare policy, energy, transport, employment law and human rights law should be transferred to Holyrood.

=== Chapman's challenges ===
In 2015, Maggie Chapman was challenged as co-convenor by activist Zara Kitson in the party's internal elections. Kitson was second on the party list for Glasgow in the 2016 Scottish Parliament election and was nominated by former MSP Mark Ruskell and endorsed by MSP and former convenor Alison Johnstone. The election was notable as it was the first time an incumbent co-convenor faced a serious challenge, all to date had been re-elected as the sole nominees.

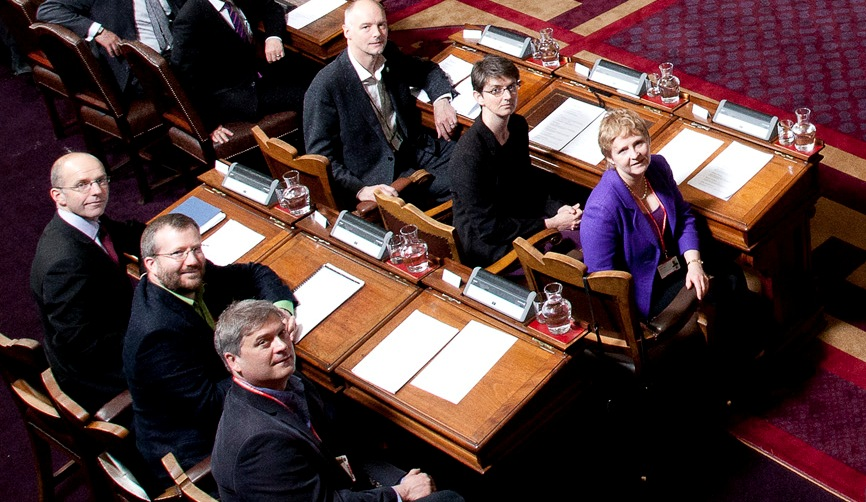
Edinburgh Green councillors, including Maggie Chapman (top middle)

The party's selection process of co-convenor Maggie Chapman as lead candidate in the North East Scotland region for the 2016 election attracted controversy. After she won selection by local members in late 2015, some members started a petition calling for her de-selection and replacement with a local candidate, whose signatures included fellow list candidates Green councillor Martin Ford and former Green councillor Debra Storr, as well as former Green MSP Shiona Baird. Then, allegations emerged of ballot irregularities in the selection process, although they were dismissed by the party's Elections and Campaigns Committee. There was also controversy around claims Chapman had pretended to have a doctorate, although the party claimed it was an administrative error.

The party's national council ruled that the ballot result was the "settled will of the party" and told Ford and Storr to cease contesting it or resign as candidates. Both chose to resign both as candidates and party members.

=== Brexit and 2016 Scottish Parliament election ===
In the leadup to the 2016 Scottish Parliament election, the party campaigned with a focus on tax-rises for the rich, with co-convneor Patrick Harvie saying it would be “agenda item one” in any post-election talks with the SNP. The party's key message was that "a better Scotland needs a bolder Holyrood" and the party aimed to elect 7 MSPs In the next parliament, Greens set out to be the SNP's "constructive opposition".

In the 2016 Scottish Parliament election, the party won 6 more seats, its best result since 2003. The result pushed the party ahead of the Scottish Liberal Democrats in seat numbers, making it the fourth-largest party for the first time. The Scottish Greens also elected the youngest MSP ever, Ross Greer at the age of 21.

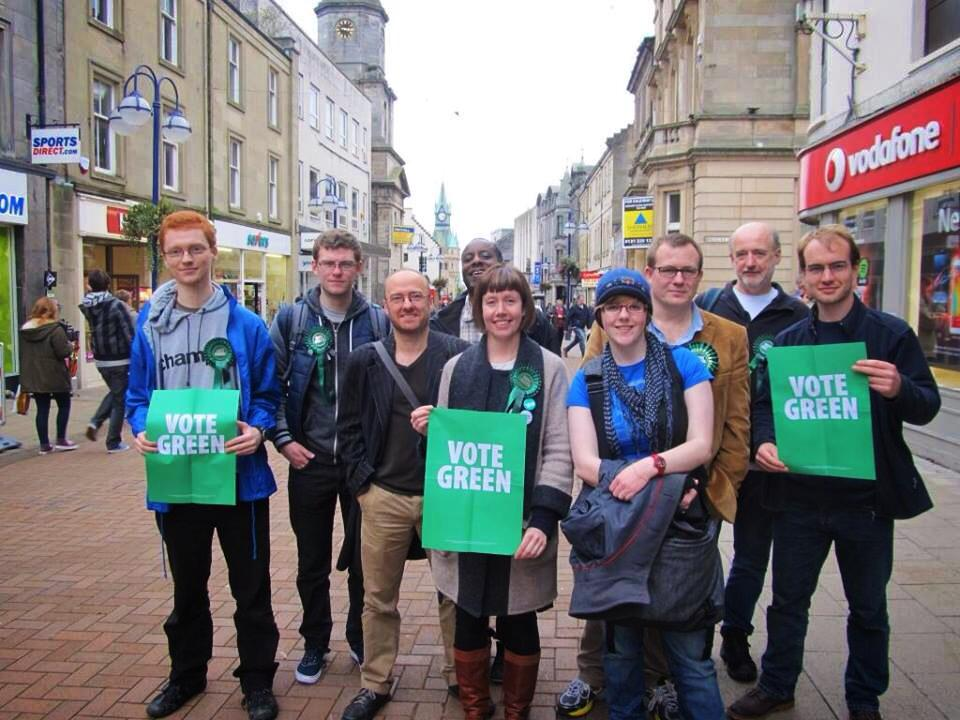
A collection of Green activists with co-leader Patrick Harvie

In the 2016 United Kingdom European Union membership referendum, the party called for a 'Remain' vote. After the vote to Leave, co-leader Patrick Harvie argued that Scotland "must keep open every option for protecting ourselves from this threat" Subsequently, the party began more strongly advocating for a second Scottish independence referendum.

In February 2015, the party announced that it would field candidates in 32 seats for the 2015 United Kingdom general election with 40% of their candidates being women. In 2017 the party generated some controversy by standing only 3 candidates at the general election. In the 2019 general election they contested significantly more seats in 22 constituencies. They failed to win any seats and lost their deposit in every contest.

The 2017 Scottish local elections saw 'real progress' with the party returning 14 councillors across Scotland, with 8 in the City of Edinburgh Council.

== Inaugural co-leaders and first Green ministers (2019–present) ==
=== Leadup to the 2021 Scottish Parliament election ===
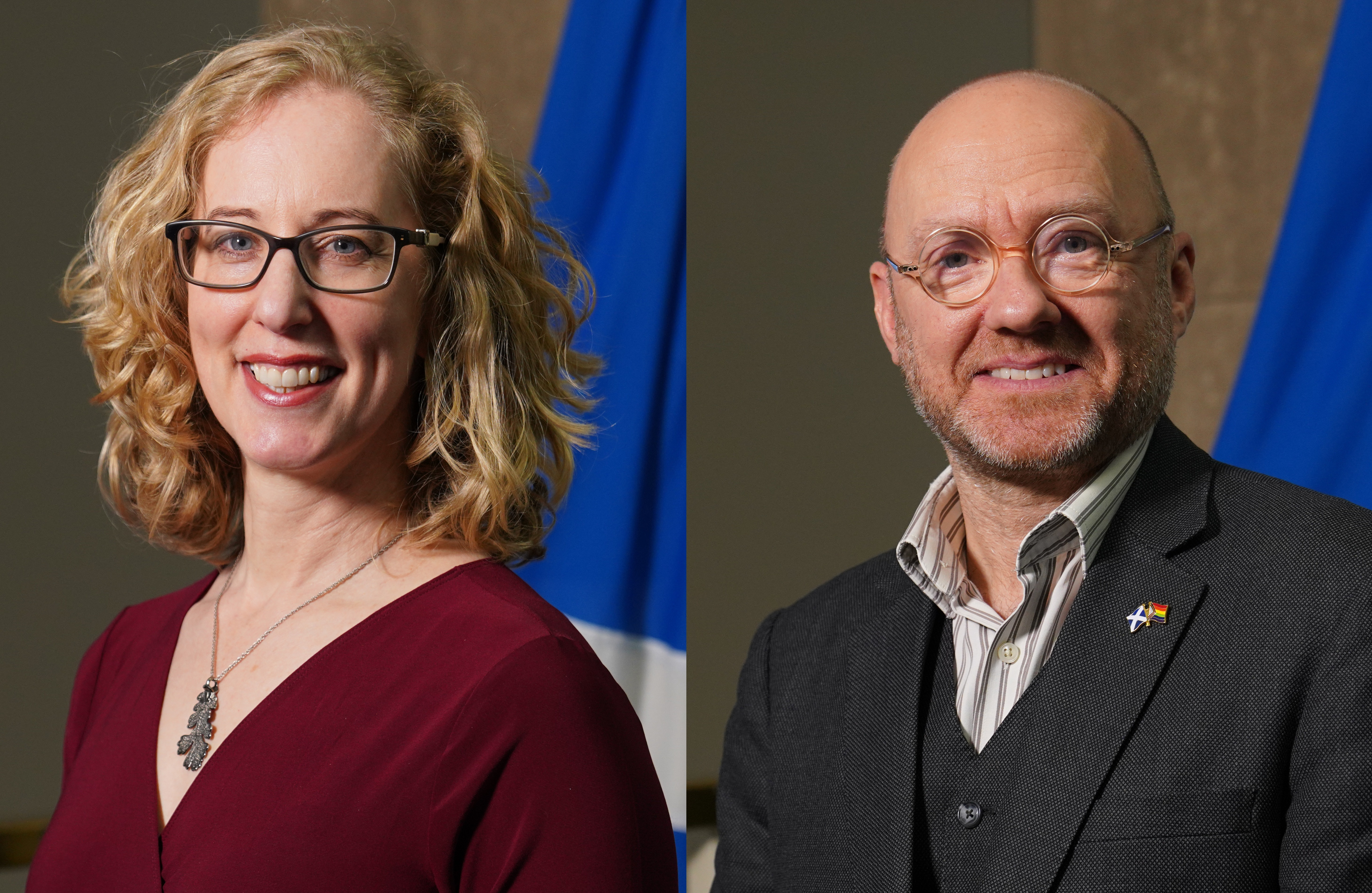
Lorna Slater (left) and Harvie (right) became the inaugural co-leaders of the party in 2019.

The Scottish Greens contested the 2019 European Parliament election in the United Kingdom, with co-convenor Maggie Chapman as lead candidate and rising stars Lorna Slater and Gillian Mackay also on the list. The party campaigned on a message of a "just and welcoming Scotland at the heart of Europe" but failed to elect any MEPs despite other Green parties having significant success across Europe.

In August 2019, a newly adopted constitution by the party led to the 2019 Scottish Green Party co-leadership election, where Patrick Harvie and Lorna Slater were elected as co-leaders with 43.1% and 30.2% respectively.

=== 2021 Scottish Parliament election and power-sharing agreement ===
In the 2021 Scottish Parliament election the party won a record eight Holyrood seats. Alison Johnstone was one of the eight MSPs elected for the Scottish Greens in the election, however on 13 May 2021 she gave up her party affiliation in order to become Holyrood's Presiding Officer as the position is a politically neutral role. Thus the party's number of elected representatives in the Scottish Parliament was reduced from 8 MSPs to 7.

After two months of negotiations, on 20 August 2021, the Scottish Greens announced a new power-sharing agreement with the SNP Scottish Government. While not an official coalition, for the first time in Scottish and UK history it offered the Greens two ministerial posts. The agreement will see both parties pledge for a second referendum on Scottish independence, an increase investment in active travel and public transport, enhancing tenants rights, a ten-year £500m Just Transition and establishing a National Care Service.

Some commentators on the left praised the agreement for its commitments to railway decarbonisation, rent controls and a just transition fund for the North East of Scotland.

The agreement faced some criticism inside the party for not being radical enough. In openDemocracy, member Adam Ramsay argued that "beyond rent controls and tenants’ rights, few of the proposed ideas [in the agreement] mean picking real fights with people with much power." but also noted that due to the party's more radical membership having greater power than most political parties, that could make the government more radical. Outside the party, some commentators thought the agreement was too radical and thought the party was a "dangerous, extremist influence on [the] government" and it was condemned by the Scottish Conservatives and Scottish Labour Academic Professor Nicola McEwen suggested that the agreement "sometimes pushes [the SNP] further" particularly on climate, social and fair work policy. She also argues that the two parties had already converged on many issues over the preceding decade. However, critics and supporters of the party agree that the agreement has allowed the party to have a lot of influence on the Scottish government.

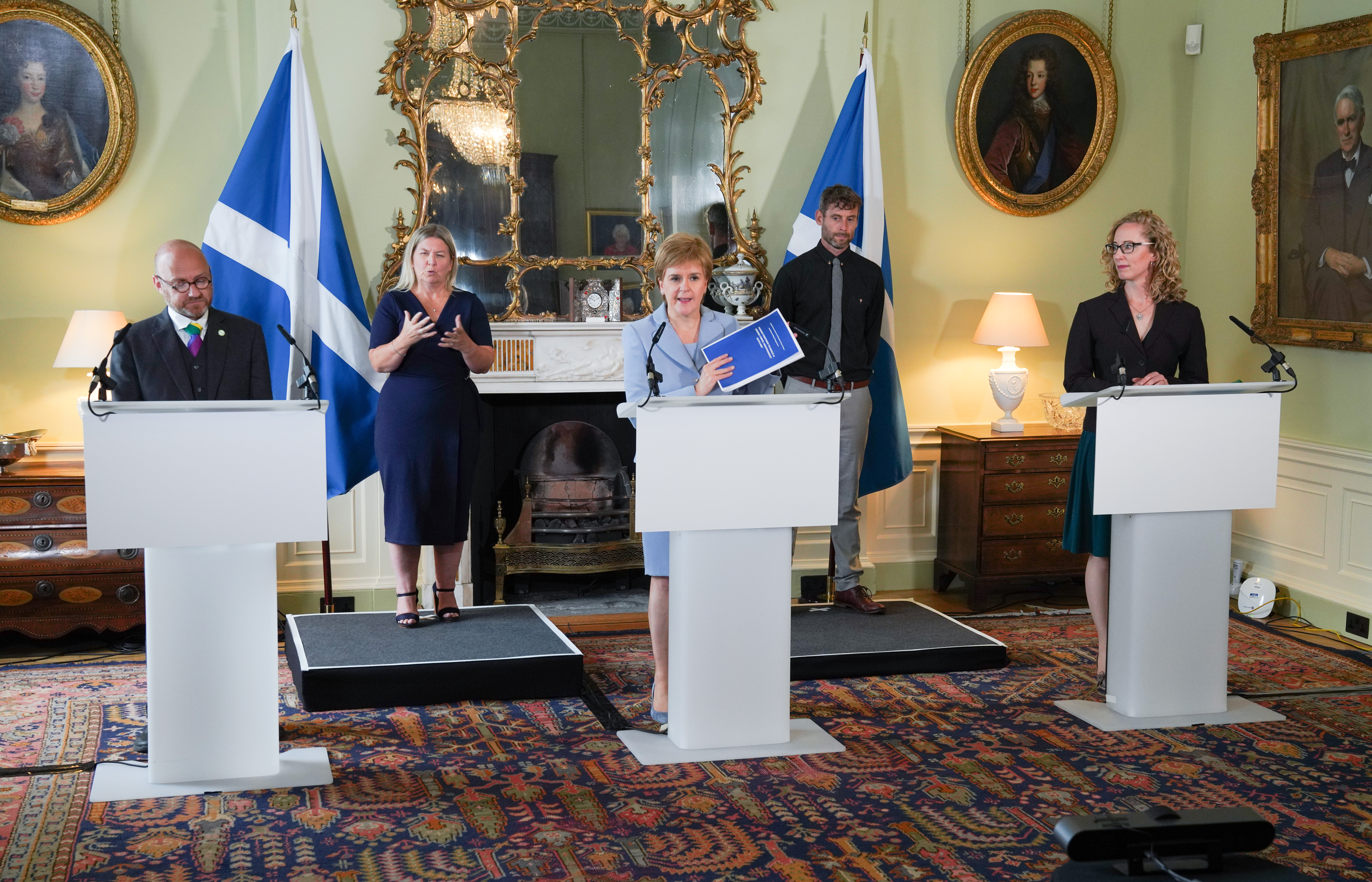
Harvie (left) and Slater (right) with Nicola Sturgeon announcing the SNP-Green power-sharing deal.

The deal was subject to Scottish Green Party members approving the deal as "its constitution requires a power-sharing deal at Holyrood to be put to a full vote of the membership, and a two-thirds majority vote by its ruling council". On 28 August 2021, it was announced that Scottish Green members had backed the deal, with 83% of members who took part in an extraordinary general meeting voting in favour of the deal with some proxy votes still to be counted. The deal then passed the required two-thirds majority of the party's National Council, meaning the deal was then formally ratified.

=== Success in local government ===
The 2022 Scottish local elections saw a record result for the party, doubling its seat count to 35. The party elected councillors for the first time in North Lanarkshire, South Lanarkshire, Argyll and Bute, Clackmannanshire, Shetland, East Lothian, Moray and the Scottish Borders. The party committed to introduce policies in local government based on climate and social justice.

In the central belt cities, the party also got closer to power, either supporting a minority administration or attempting to form a coalition with the SNP in Glasgow and Edinburgh:

- In Glasgow City Council, the party agreed a 'co-operation' deal with the SNP to support their minority administration. While it does not bind the party to support the administration long-term, it gave the party a greater say on the development of the council's strategic plan and the chair in the Net Zero Committee in return for voting in favour of the SNP forming the administration. The party in Glasgow also secured first place in several council wards for the first time, in Hillhead and Langside.
- In Edinburgh, the party attempted to form a coalition with the SNP, but their effort was defeated after Labour won Conservative support to form a minority administration. Later, the two parties also proposed a joint budget, which was also defeated. The party key aims included reducing the number of short term lets in the city, introducing a levy on carparking spaces to be paid by big employers and doubling the number of council homes in the city.
- In North Lanarkshire, sole Green councillor Claire Williams was part of the balance of power, and supported the formation of a SNP minority administration. However, after a scandal in the SNP caused defections to Labour, the administration fell.

=== Entry into Government ===
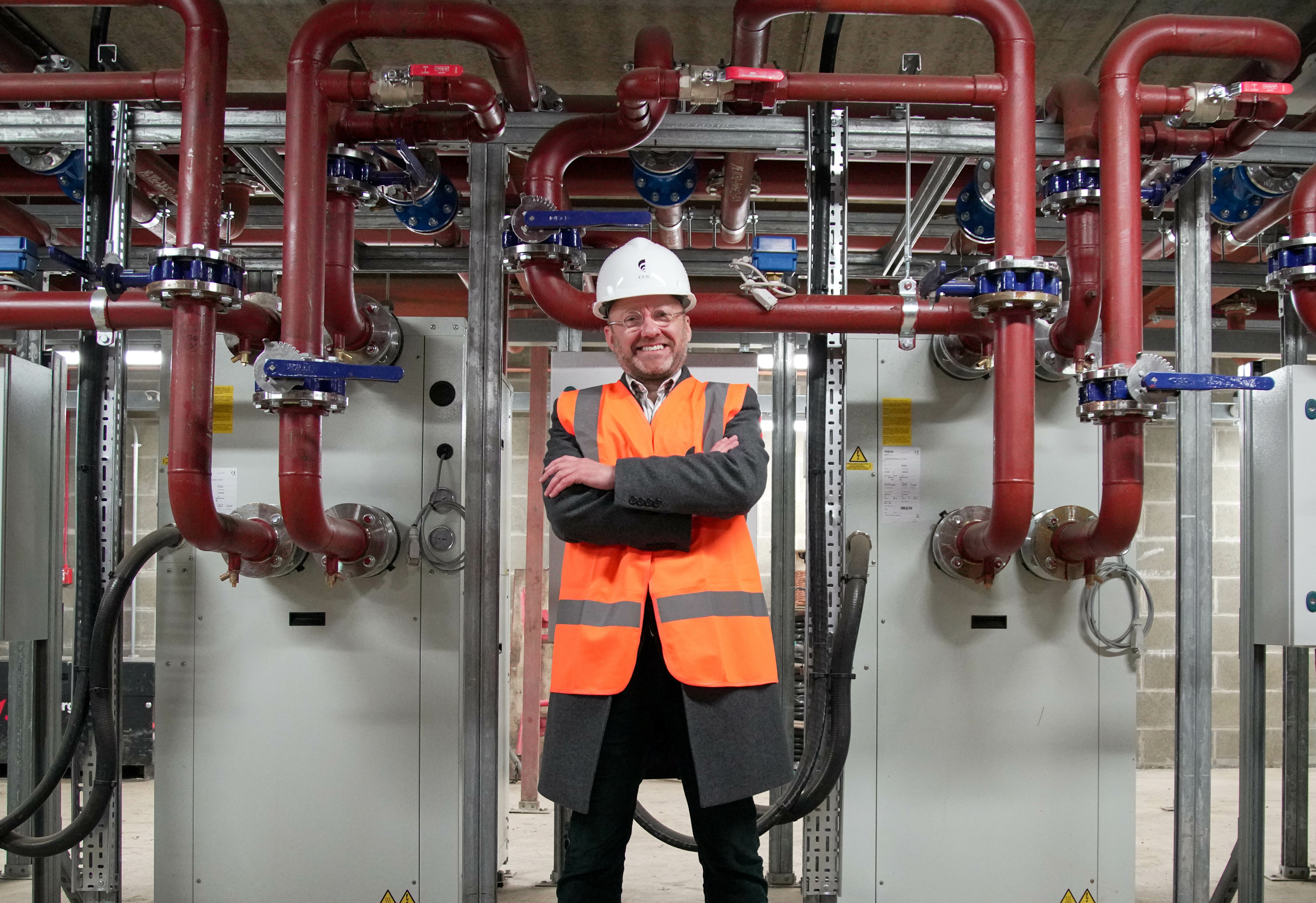
Patrick Harvie visits a housing development notable for its use of heat pumps, 2023

At their national conference in October 2022, the Scottish Greens voted to suspend the clause of their constitution which gave members of the Green Party of England and Wales automatic rights to attend meetings of the Scottish Greens, over the issue of transphobia.

After the death of Queen Elizabeth II, the party chose not to attend any of the events surrounding her death, bar a service of thanksgiving at St Giles' Cathedral, or around the Coronation of Charles III and Camilla, stating that many viewed the monarchy as a 'tiresome spectacle'. Co-leader Patrick Harvie called for a 'national debate' on the future of the monarchy

On 15 February 2023, Nicola Sturgeon resigned as First Minister of Scotland and leader of the Scottish National Party, pending a leadership election. The party praised her leadership, calling her the "most significant figure of the devolution era". Green MSP for the Highlands and Islands Ariane Burgess said she had left a "solid foundation" to respond to the climate emergency and deliver independence.

A key issue in the following leadership campaign became around the continuation of the power-sharing agreement with the Scottish Greens, with Humza Yousaf backing it, but Kate Forbes and Ash Regan criticising it. At the party's spring conference, co-leaders Patrick Harvie and Lorna Slater declared that while they had "so much more to deliver" in government, they would not do so at "any cost". These comments were widely interpreted as meaning that the Scottish Greens would not support a government led by Forbes or Regan. This speculation was later confirmed by Harvie, stating that due to Forbes positions "[the power-sharing agreement] would need to be ended".

We will only vote for the SNP's new Leader to become First Minister if they are committed to the politics of cooperation. If they respect and share our values of equality and environmentalism. [...] These are fundamental issues for us. They are non-negotiable.

— Lorna Slater, speaking at the party's 2023 Spring Conference

Inside the party, the Scottish Green Party Trade Union Group called for a 'debate' at an extraordinary general meeting on the future of the agreement. However, elements in the party doubted they had the support to secure the calling of an EGM.

After the election of Humza Yousaf as Leader of the Scottish National Party, the Scottish Green Party National Council unanimously voted to direct its MSPs to vote for Yousaf to become First Minister and continue their power-sharing agreement. The party's co-leaders continue to serve as ministers in the Yousaf government.

=== Successes and challenges in government ===
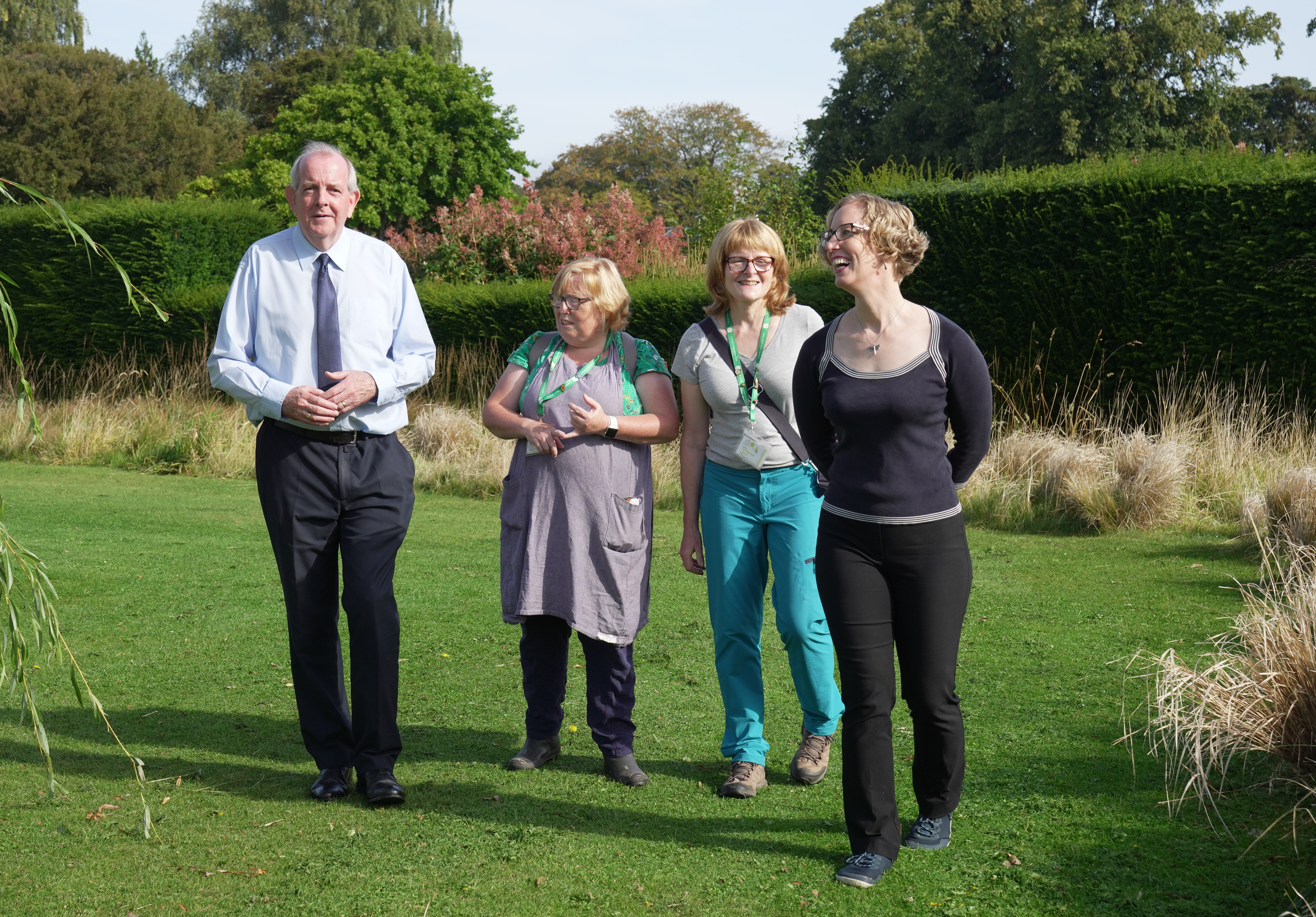
Co-leader Lorna Slater (furthest right) announcing new legal targets for nature recovery.

In government, the party introduced the first government bill from a Green Minister, with the Cost of Living (Tenant Protection) (Scotland) Act 2022 to freeze rents and ban evictions in response to the cost of living crisis. In 2023, the two Green ministers introduced proposals to creating two new national parks, introducing rent controls, a new draft biodiversity strategy and consulted on home heating legislation. The party also had impact in areas outwith its ministers' control, with the end of peak-time rail fares, increased funding for active travel and additional income tax bands for higher earners.

However, the party also faced significant challenges with some of its key policies. Scotland's Deposit Return Scheme, which was spearheaded by co-leader and circularity minister Lorna Slater, was delayed until at least 2025 as a result of the UK Government blocking the inclusion of glass bottles in the scheme. A commitment to protect 10% of Scotland's seas as Highly Protected Marine Areas was also dropped, and the party had concerns with SNP's pledging a council tax freeze.

The party also suffered from some internal issues, with a co-chair and co-convenor of both its National Council and Executive resigning prematurely and both co-leaders commenting that the party had experienced "an increase in factionalism and hostile behaviour". On 3 August 2023, Robin Harper, the party's first MSP resigned claiming the party had 'lost the plot' and announced he would vote Labour in the 2024 United Kingdom general election.

In an interview at the party's Autumn conference, co-leader Lorna Slater suggested that independence was not a "red line" for any future power-sharing deals with Scottish Labour, re-affirming similar comments during the independence referendum.

Nonetheless, the party also enjoyed an unprecedented level of support. Some within the party commentators lauded the party's role in government for raising income tax and securing better representation for trades unions in the public sector.
