= Young Academy of Scotland =

Learned society in Scotland

- Formation: 2011
- Type: Academy
- Region served: Scotland
- Members: 134 (in 2021)
- Main organ: Advisory Group
- Affiliations: Royal Society of Edinburgh
- Website: www.youngacademyofscotland.org.uk

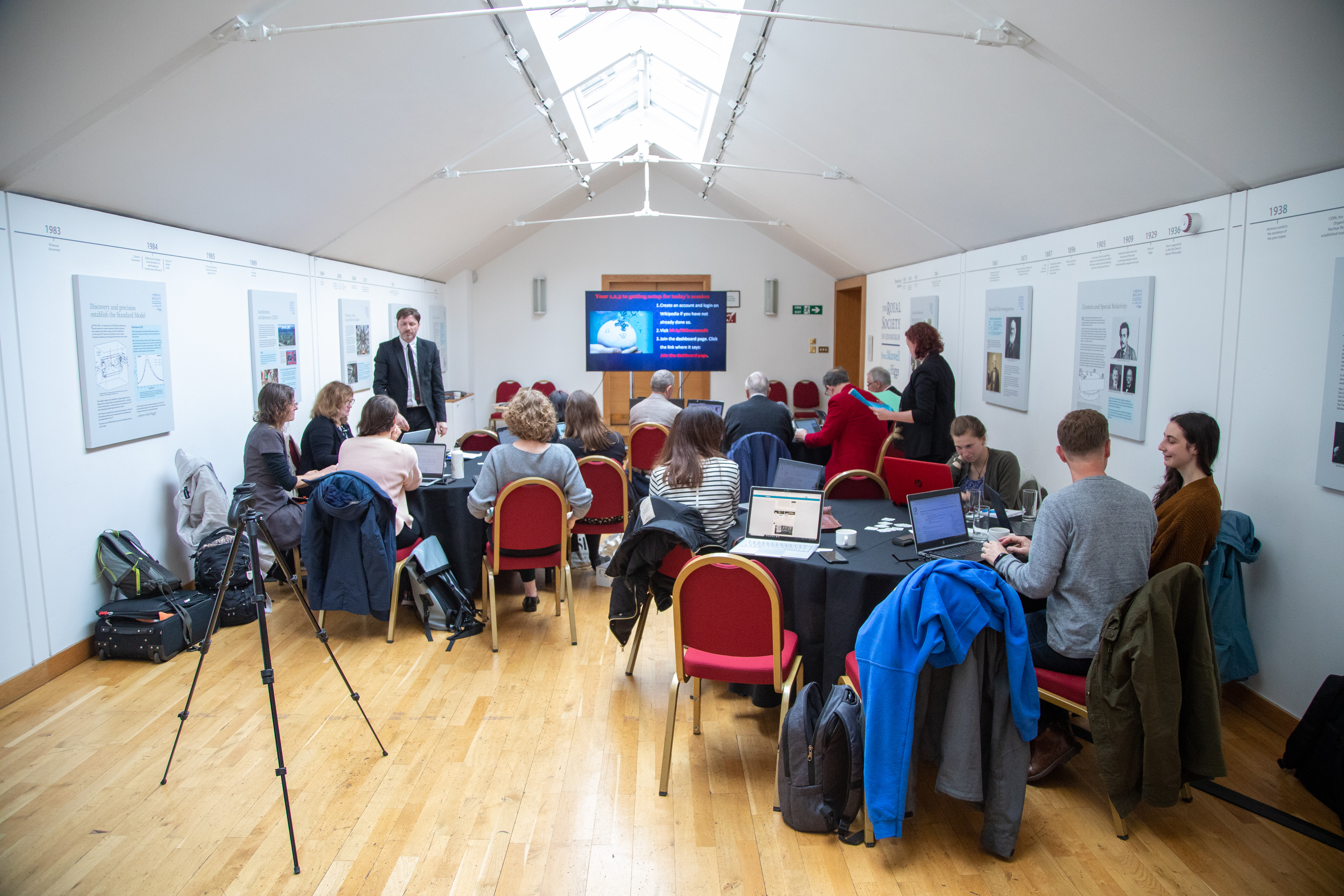
Wikipedia "Women in Science" edit-a-thon by the RSE Young Academy of Scotland

The Young Academy of Scotland is a Scottish organization of young people from the sciences humanities, professions, arts, business and civil society. It was established by the Royal Society of Edinburgh in 2011.

The members (equal numbers of women and men in their 20s to 40s) aim to provide ideas and direction for challenges facing Scotland. Membership is generally for 5 years, with selection from applications every two years. In 2021, there were 134 members. Current members include Edinburgh University Rector Deborah Kayembe and former Rector Peter McColl.

== Activities ==
The Young Academy of Scotland initiatives have ranged from policy advice on Brexit, to promoting diversity multiculturalism in Scotland, enhancing inclusion in the workforce, undertaking outreach in local schools to engage young people in science and developing educational resources such as YouTube videos to improve numerical literacy.

In 2019, the Academy started the Mosul Bookbridge Project to help the University of Mosul in Iraq rebuild its library, which was destroyed during the ISIS insurgency in 2014.

== See also ==
- Global Young Academy
- UK Young Academy
- Young Academy of Europe
