= Bright Green =

UK Green politics blog

- Website type: Political blog
- Available in: English
- Owners: Edited by members of the Green Party of England and Wales and the Scottish Greens
- Founders: Adam Ramsay, Gary Dunion, Peter McColl, Maggie Chapman
- Editor: Chris Jarvis
- Website: bright-green.org
- Launched: 2010

Bright Green is a progressive UK politics blog primarily edited by members of the Green Party of England and Wales and the Scottish Greens.

The current editor is Chris Jarvis, a Green councillor in Oxford. The site was founded by Adam Ramsay, Gary Dunion, Peter McColl and Maggie Chapman, while former MSP Mark Ballard was honorary editor in chief.

In 2011 McColl was voted the UK's top Green blogger for his contributions to Bright Green.

The blog was listed in the top 100 political blogs by Total Politics in 2011.

Bright Green contributors are active in Scottish and UK politics beyond the website, hosting discussions and workshops at events and conferences, such as the 2012 Radical Independence Campaign national conference.
