= Steve Morrison =

Steve Morrison may refer to:

- Steve Morrison (radio personality) (born 1959), American radio DJ
- Steve Morrison (footballer) (born 1961), Scottish footballer
- Steve Morrison (American football) (born 1971), former Indianapolis Colt
- Steve Morrison (TV producer) (born 1947), Scottish TV producer and former Rector of the University of Edinburgh
- Stevie Morrison (born 1978), British yachtsman
- Steven Morrison, Scottish drummer, formerly with the View
- Steve Morrison (Australian jazz musician, album producer, double and electric bass player, guitarist, mathematician, author, actor, pastor, speaker, university teacher, academic, film crew member, international conference speaker, entrepreneur)

== See also ==
- George Stephen Morrison (1919–2008), American admiral, father of singer Jim Morrison
- Steve Morison (born 1983), Welsh international footballer
