= Non-timber forest product =

Commodities obtained from forests other than timber

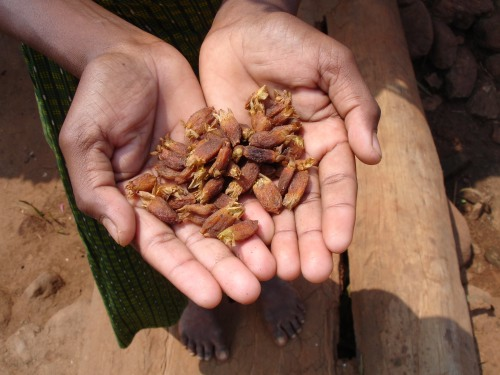
Dried Mahua flowers

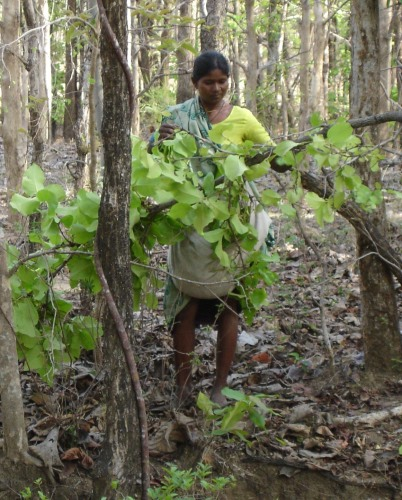
Tendu patta (leaf) collection

Non-timber forest products (NTFPs) are useful foods, substances, materials and/or commodities obtained from forests other than timber. Harvest ranges from wild collection to farming. They typically include game animals, fur-bearers, nuts, seeds, berries, mushrooms, oils, sap, foliage, pollarding, medicinal plants, peat, mast, fuelwood, fish, insects, spices, and forage. Overlapping concepts include non-wood forest products (NWFPs), wild forest products, minor forest produce, special, minor, alternative and secondary forest products – for further distinctions see the definition section below

Research on NTFPs has focused on their ability to be produced as commodities for rural incomes and markets, as an expression of traditional knowledge or as a livelihood option for rural household needs, as a key component of sustainable forest management and conservation strategies, and for their important role in improving dietary diversity and providing nutritious food, particularly for forest-proximate peoples. All research promotes forest products as valuable commodities and tools that can promote the conservation of forests.

NTFPs are of value to local people and communities, but have been overlooked in the wake of forest management priorities (for example, timber production and animal forage). For example, some 2.4 billion people – in both urban and rural settings – use wood-based energy for cooking.

In recent decades, interest has grown in using NTFPs as alternatives or supplements to forest management practices. In some forest types, under the right political and social conditions, forests can be managed to increase NTFP diversity, and consequently, to increase biodiversity and potentially economic diversity. Black truffle cultivation in the Mediterranean area is highly profitable when well managed.

== Definitions ==
NTFPs include such varied products as mushrooms, huckleberries, ferns, transplants, seed cones, pine nuts, tree nuts, moss, maple syrup, cork, cinnamon, rubber, wild pigs, tree oils and resins, and ginseng. The United Kingdom's Forestry Commission defines NTFPs as "any biological resources found in woodlands except timber", and Forest Harvest, part of the Reforesting Scotland project, defines them as "materials supplied by woodlands - except the conventional harvest of timber". These definitions include wild and managed game, fish, and insects.

=== Non-wood forest products ===
Non-wood forest products (NWFPs) are a subset of NTFP; they exclude woodfuel and wood charcoal. Both NWFP and NTFP include wild foods. Worldwide, around 1 billion people depend to some extent on wild foods such as wild meat, edible insects, edible plant products, mushrooms and fish, which often contain high levels of key micronutrients. Several million households world-wide depend on NWFPs for income, and these products may be particularly important for local economies. On a global scale, FAO estimates that NWFPs generated US$88 billion in 2011.

Land conversion, pollution and overharvesting threaten wild species and collectors' lives and livelihoods in many regions of the world. For instance, one in five medicinal and aromatic plant species have been found to be threatened with extinction, yet only 7 percent of MAPs have been assessed for the IUCN Red List of Threatened Species (TRAFFIC, 2018). Data and information on NWFPs is incomplete yet essential to monitor their status in the wild, their contribution to food and nutrition security and for traceability across the supply chain.

Other groupings or names for these types of forest products include wild forest products, minor forest produce, special, minor, alternative and secondary forest products. The term non-wood forest products (NWFP) differs from NTFP in that it does not include woodfuel or wood charcoal. The terminology debate on NWFPs has persisted for decades, although steps have been taken to disentangle the different terms and definitions for improved forest statistics.

== Uses ==
The harvest of NTFPs remains widespread throughout the world. People from a wide range of socioeconomic, geographical, and cultural contexts harvest NTFPs for a number of purposes, including household subsistence, maintenance of cultural and familial traditions, spiritual fulfilment, physical and emotional well-being, house heating and cooking, animal feeding, indigenous medicine and healing, scientific learning, and income.

More than 28,000 plant species are currently recorded as being of medicinal use; many of them are found in forest ecosystems. Visits to forest environments can have positive impacts on human physical and mental health and many people have a deep spiritual relationship to forests.

== Economic importance ==
Estimating the contribution of NTFPs to national or regional economies is difficult, broad-based systems for tracking the combined value of the hundreds of products that make up various NTFP industries are lacking. One exception to this is the maple syrup industry, which in 2002 in the US alone yielded 1.4 million US gallons (5,300 m^{3}) worth US$D 38.3 million. In temperate forests such as in the US, wild edible mushrooms such as matsutake, medicinal plants such as ginseng, and floral greens such as salal and sword fern are multimillion-dollar industries. Others with documented trade data include Brazil nuts, bamboo, honey, chestnuts, and gum Arabic, among others.

In tropical forests, for example, NTFPs can be an important source of income that can supplement farming and/or other activities. A value analysis of the Amazon rainforest in Peru found that exploitation of NTFPs could yield higher net revenue per hectare than would timber harvest of the same area, while still conserving vital ecological services.

== Impacts on people ==
=== Gendered differences ===
Both men and women are involved in collection and sale of NWFPs – and have different knowledge on different products, although women tend to collect forest foods to supplement the nutrition of their households – empowering them has important spill-over effects on households'/communities' nutrition. For part-time (unpaid) collection of woodfuel for rural uses, women account for almost 80 percent of all labour and a significantly higher proportion than this in Africa and Latin America and the Caribbean.

== Research ==
Research on NTFPs has focused on three perspectives: NTFPs as a commodity with a focus on rural incomes and markets, as an expression of traditional knowledge or as a livelihood option for rural household needs, and finally, as a key component of sustainable forest management and conservation strategies. These perspectives promote forest products as valuable commodities and important tools that can promote the conservation of forests. In some contexts, the gathering and use of NTFPs can be a mechanism for poverty alleviation and local development.

- Bioproducts
- Ethnobotany
- Countermeasures in LULUCF
- Ecotourism in the Amazon rainforest
- Rural crafts
- Waste valorization

== Sources ==
This article incorporates text from a free content work. Licensed under CC BY-SA 3.0 IGO (license statement/permission). Text taken from The State of the World's Forests 2020. Forests, biodiversity and people – In brief, FAO & UNEP, FAO & UNEP.
