= Université Libre de Kinshasa =

Private university in the DRC

Free University of Kinshasa
- Université Libre de Kinshasa (French)
- Type: Private
- Established: 15 October 1988; 37 years ago
- Location: Kinshasa, Democratic Republic of the Congo; 4.3667°S 15.3476°E
- Campus: Urban
- Nickname: ULK
- Website: University website

The Université Libre de Kinshasa (French; lit. 'Free University of Kinshasa', known as ULK) is a private university in Kinshasa, Democratic Republic of the Congo.

It was established on 15 October 1988. It was the first private secular university in the DRC.

== Alumni ==
- Debora Kayembe

== See also ==
- List of universities in the Democratic Republic of the Congo
- Education in the Democratic Republic of the Congo
