= Iain Macwhirter =

Scottish political journalist (born 1952)

Iain MacWhirter
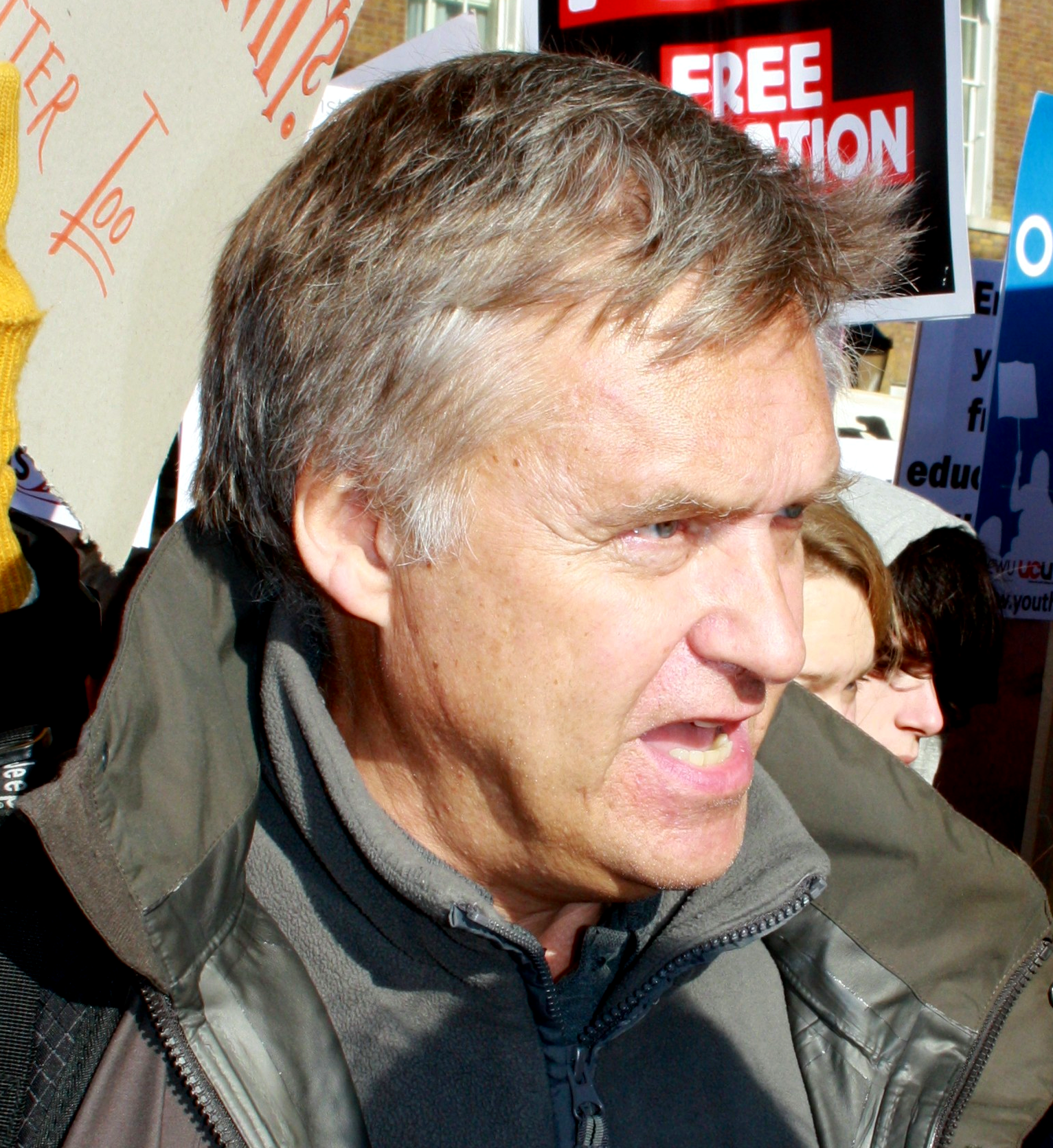

Lord Rector of the University of Edinburgh
- In office 13 February 2009 – 10 January 2012
- Preceded by: Mark Ballard
- Succeeded by: Peter McColl
- Majority: 2,640

Personal details
- Born: 24 September 1952 (age 73)
- Education: George Heriot's School
- Alma mater: University of Edinburgh
- Occupation: Journalist

Iain Macwhirter (born 24 September 1952) is a Scottish political journalist. He is a political commentator for several newspapers, an author and documentary film and radio presenter and a former Rector of Edinburgh University. He has worked at both the UK Parliament and Scottish Parliament, presenting the BBC2 programmes Westminster Live, Scrutiny and, from 1999, the BBC TV programme Holyrood Live from the Scottish Parliament.

In 2013, he published Road to Referendum, which accompanied a three-part television series of the same name on STV and ITV. Following the Scottish independence referendum, he published Disunited Kingdom: How Westminster Won A Referendum But Lost Scotland, a retrospective on his experiences as a journalist documenting the campaign. In 2015, his book Tsunami, about the SNP's victory in the 2015 general election, was published by Freight Books.

== Education ==
Macwhirter was educated at George Heriot's School, a grant-aided independent school in Edinburgh, Scotland, followed by the University of Edinburgh, where he graduated with an honours degree in politics.

== Life and career ==
In his Road to Referendum Macwhirter recounts rejecting his parents' nationalism in the 1970s. He worked for the BBC for almost 20 years, first as a researcher and then as a current affairs reporter, before becoming Scottish political correspondent in 1987. From 1989, he was a member of the Westminster press contingent, as part of Westminster Live. In 1999, he presented Politics Scotland and Holyrood Live until both were axed in 2007 and 2009 respectively.

=== Current journalism ===
Macwhirter writes weekly columns for The Herald, The Scotsman and Scotland on Sunday, all morning papers. He returned to Scotland to help launch the Sunday Herald in 1999, and has presented the Scottish Parliament magazine programme Holyrood Live. He also writes for UnHerd, Public Finance and other publications.

Macwhirter's columns were suspended by The Herald in September 2022, after allegations he posted an offensive tweet about members of Liz Truss's cabinet.

=== Rector of The University of Edinburgh ===
Macwhirter announced that he was standing for Rector of the University of Edinburgh on 12 January 2009, and was backed by George Galloway following the latter's withdrawal as a candidate for the post. He was elected Rector on 13 February 2009, winning by 4,822 votes to 2,182 (69% to 31%). succeeding the former Green MSP Mark Ballard.

== See also ==
- Media of Scotland

== Bibliography ==
- "Iain Macwhirter | writer and broadcaster". Iainmacwhirter.wordpress.com. 13 March 1999.
- Iain Macwhirter. "Full profile | Global". The Guardian.
- "Writers". Newstatesman.com. 9 March 2017.

Academic offices
| Preceded by Mark Ballard | Rector of the University of Edinburgh; 2009–2012 | Succeeded by Peter McColl |
