= Mandy Haggith =

English poet, author and activist

Mandy Haggith is an author, poet, and environmental activist. She was born and brought up in Northumberland. In 1989 she took up an academic post at Griffith University in Brisbane, Australia. After returning to the United Kingdom, she worked for twenty years as a forest activist. She is the coordinator of Environmental Paper Network International, and was a founding director of Top Left Corner, a community arts organisation. Since 1999 she has lived on a coastal wooded croft in Assynt, in the northwest Highlands of Scotland. She is married to Bill Ritchie, who was secretary of the Assynt Crofters during their purchase of the North Assynt estate in 1993. She is currently a director of the Assynt Foundation.

In 2013, she was poet in residence at the Royal Botanic Garden in Edinburgh. She is an honorary research fellow and lecturer in creative writing at the University of the Highlands and Islands.

In 2022, the Trees Meet Sea exhibition, conceived through Haggith's residency at Inverewe Garden in Wester Ross, explored the meeting point of trees and the sea through a collaboration with fourteen other artists. The exhibition was subsequently mounted at Dundee Botanic Garden.

== Education ==
Mandy Haggith has a master's degree in creative writing (with distinction) from Glasgow University.

== Bibliography ==
Haggith is the author of five novels and six poetry collections and has contributed to the journal Reforesting Scotland.

Novels
- The Last Bear (2008)
- Bear Witness (2013)

The Stone Stories trilogy

- The Walrus Mutterer (2018)
- The Amber Seeker (2019)
- The Lyre Dancers (2020)

Poetry
- letting light in (2005)
- Castings (2007)
- A-B Tree (2016)
- Into the forest (editor) (2013)
Non-fiction
- Paper Trails (2008)
- The Lost Elms (2025)
