= Chafyn Grove School =

Location
- 33 Bourne Avenue; Salisbury, Wiltshire, SP1 1LR; England
- Coordinates: 51.075°N 1.784°W

Information
- Type: Private, day and boarding, preparatory school
- Motto: Ut Sibi Sic Alteri; Do unto others as you would have them do unto you.
- Religious affiliation: Church of England
- Established: 1879
- Founder: W. C. Bird
- Head teacher: Simon Head
- Staff: 107
- Gender: Mixed
- Age: 3 to 13
- Enrolment: 197 (2023)
- Website: www.chafyngrove.co.uk

Chafyn Grove School is a private co-educational day and boarding preparatory school situated on the edge of the city of Salisbury in Wiltshire, in England's West Country. Founded in 1879 by Mr. W. C. Bird as an all-boys' school, it became Chafyn Grove School in 1916, when it was renamed after its first benefactress, Julia Chafyn Grove.

== History ==
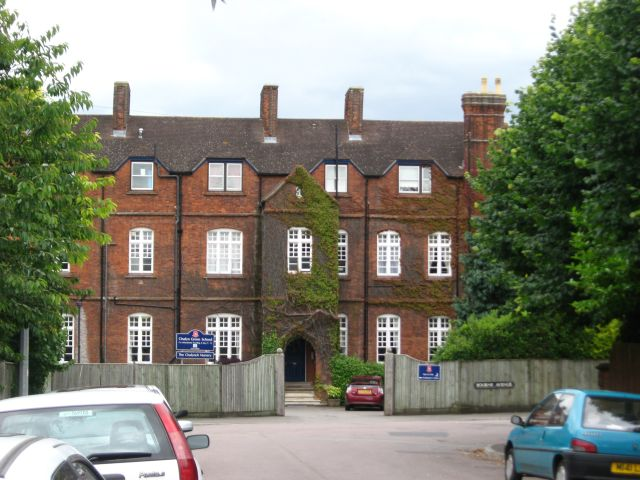
The main building of Chafyn Grove

Salisbury School for Boys was built in 1879 by Mr W. C. Bird. In 1889 the Reverend J. C. Alcock bought the school, which at this time catered for 11- to 18-year-old boys.

In 1897, Julia Chafyn Grove of Zeals House near Mere in Wiltshire died. She was a great supporter of her community, having paid for a school at Mere in 1899; she endowed a ward at Salisbury Hospital and gave an organ to Salisbury Cathedral. In her will, she left £5,000 to assist education in the city of Salisbury, and in particular to provide a school which would take the place of the Elizabethan grammar school endowment which Salisbury formerly had. It was decided to use this money to buy Mr Alcock’s school, which was then converted into a charitable trust, and the buildings greatly enlarged. The following year, 1898, the new wing was officially opened by Bishop Wordsworth.

1916, the governors invited Mr H.L Whytehead to become headmaster. He transformed the school into a preparatory school and renamed it Chafyn Grove to commemorate its first benefactress.

Two former deputy headmasters have served as Chairman of the Independent Association of Prep Schools: Andy Falconer in 2010/11 and Eddy Newton in 2013/14.

== Location ==
Chafyn Grove School is on the northeastern edge of Salisbury within 12 acres (4.9 ha) of land. The site has an AstroTurf field, a sports hall, a swimming pool, extensive playing fields and an adventure playground.

== Notable former pupils ==
- Michael Clapp, senior Royal Navy officer who commanded the United Kingdom's amphibious assault group, Task Group 317.0, in the Falklands War
- Richard Dawkins, ethologist, evolutionary biologist, and author
- Simon Fanshawe, writer and broadcaster
- Peter Chalke, leader of Wiltshire County Council
- James Holland, author
- Tom Holland, author
- David Stratton, English-Australian film critic and historian
- Alex Hua Tian, Olympic equestrian representing China
