= Debora Kayembe =

Scottish human rights lawyer and political activist

Debora Kayembe FRSA
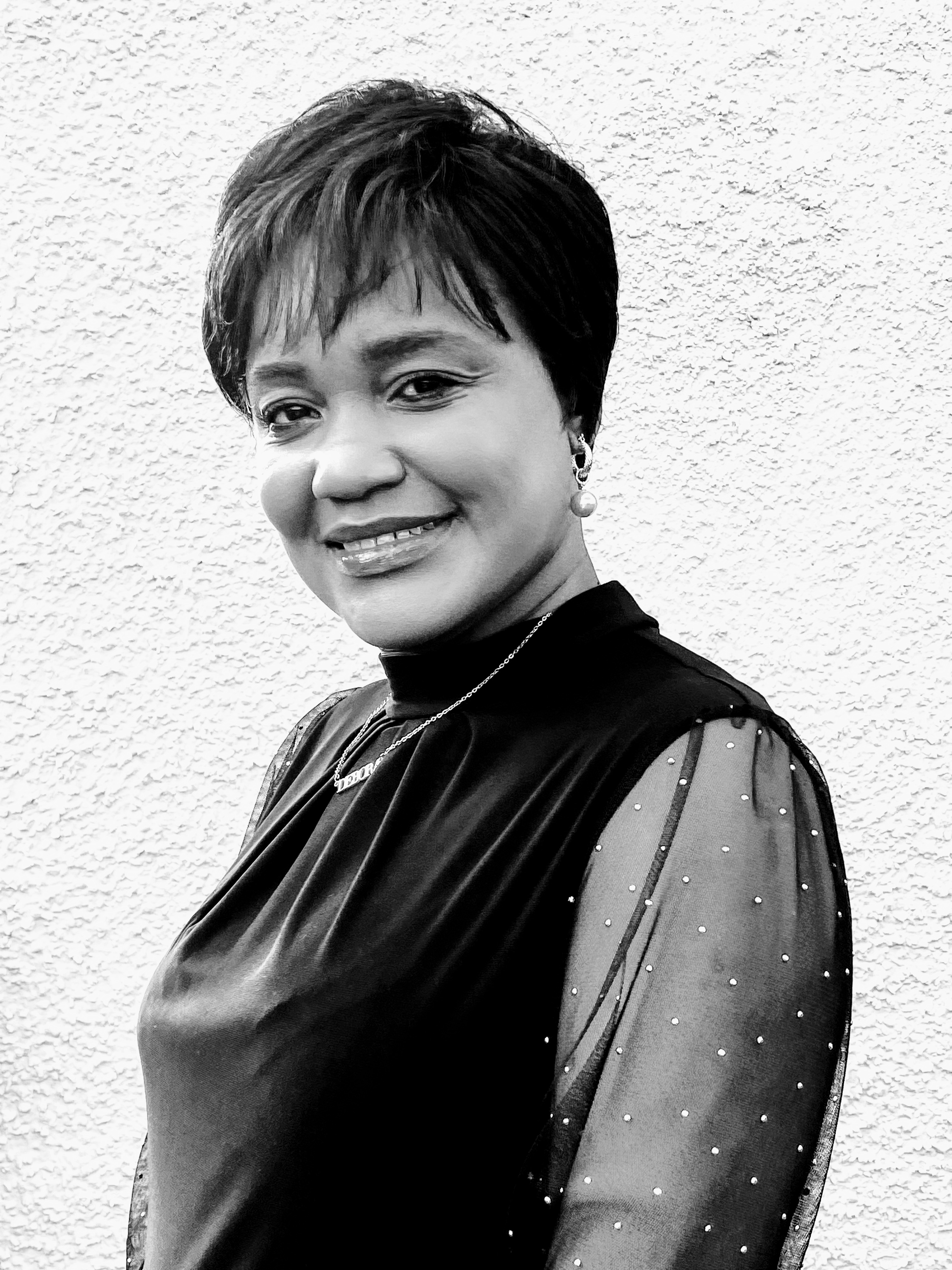

Lord Rector of the University of Edinburgh
- In office 1 March 2021 – 3 March 2024
- Preceded by: Ann Henderson
- Succeeded by: Simon Fanshawe

Personal details
- Born: April 1975 (age 51) Kinshasa, Democratic Republic of Congo
- Party: Scottish Socialist Party
- Education: Heriot Watt University; University of Strathclyde; Université libre de Kinshasa
- Occupation: Human rights lawyer

Debora Kayembe Buba (born in April 1975) is a Scottish human rights lawyer and political activist. She has served on the board of the Scottish Refugee Council, and is a member of the office of the prosecutor at the International Criminal Court and the International Criminal Court Bar Association.

== Background in the DRC ==
She originally comes from the Democratic Republic of the Congo (DRC). Educated at the Universite Libre de Kinshasa, Kayembe was a human rights activist with the NGO Toges noires (Black Togas) before her career as a barrister began with the Congolese Bar Association in 2000. Her role extended to investigating foreign investment corruption in the DRC. Kayembe was part of a delegation sent by President Joseph Kabila to South Africa aiming to establish a commission to investigate human rights in DRC. This led her to investigate a massacre in Bunia in the Second Congo War, for which any honest reporting on the horrors she investigated may have put herself in jeopardy, she was advised. Thus she emigrated to the United Kingdom as a political asylum refugee in 2005, in Blackburn, near Manchester with assistance from her MP Jack Straw ensuring she was not expelled, and got final permission to remain granted in 2007. Debora Kayembe has two children.

== Experiences in the UK ==
Her legal qualifications are recognised in Scotland (though not in English law) and so she moved there in 2011.

Kayembe is fluent in English, French, Lingala, Kikongo and Swahili acting as translator for refugees and patients in NHS hospitals. She has served on the Institute of Translation and Interpreting for ten years (to 2020).

She is a member of the Scottish Socialist Party, and sat on its executive committee from September 2015 to January 2021. Her other roles include representing refugees on the Royal Society of Edinburgh / Young Academy of Scotland and is their expert lawyer for the RSE working group for Africa.

In 2017, Kayembe founded a charity Full Options, promoting human rights and peace.

In 2019, she became the first African to have her portrait erected on the wall of the Royal Society of Edinburgh, honouring her achievements and contributions.

In 2020, Kayembe faced racist attacks on her home in Bonnyrigg, Midlothian and later in relation to her election as rector. She started the Freedom Walk campaign, a civil rights movement lobbying on behalf of citizens and petitioning by promoting social reforms, racial justice and community harmony, in particularly with regard to educational racism.

== Rector election ==
In February 2021 when she was elected Rector of the University of Edinburgh, Kayembe became the third woman since 1858 to hold the role just after Muriel Gray and Ann Henderson. Her appointment was welcomed by her local MP Owen Thompson with a call for changes in the UK immigration laws.

Kayembe's focus as rector for the three years will be on the COVID-19 pandemic, fighting racism, encouraging diversity and equal access to higher education. In welcoming her to the university, Principal and Vice Chancellor Peter Mathieson was looking forwards to working with her to 'build a bright future for the entire University'.

== External sources (media) ==
- BBC interview https://www.bbc.co.uk/programmes/p08p8lqm
- Debora Kayembe Official YouTube channel https://www.youtube.com/channel/UCPjFcSwigkzEoGtcKhVbNoA

Academic offices
Preceded by Ann Henderson	Rector of the University of Edinburgh; 2021–2024	Succeeded by Simon Fanshawe
