= Ann Henderson (campaigner) =

Trade unionist and higher education leader

Lord Rector of the University of Edinburgh
- In office 1 March 2018 – 28 February 2021
- Preceded by: Steve Morrison
- Succeeded by: Debora Kayembe

Personal details
- Education: University of Edinburgh

Ann Henderson is a campaigner in the labour movement and former Rector of the University of Edinburgh.

== Early life ==
Henderson graduated from the University of Edinburgh with an MA in Sociology and Social Administration in 1978. While at Edinburgh, she was involved in editing The Student newspaper. She subsequently gained a diploma in Youth and Community Work from Manchester Polytechnic (now Manchester Metropolitan University).

== Career ==
From 1982, Henderson worked in the rail industry, employed as a ticket collector, guard and ultimately becoming one of Scotland's first female train drivers in 1992. During this time, she played an active role in the National Union of Railwaymen trade union, now the RMT union. Henderson set up the NUR Women's Advisory Committee in 1987 and campaigned for gender and social justice. She played an important role in developing policies on sexual harassment, equality and representing women in the rail industry. She left the RMT in late 2007 to take up a position as Assistant Secretary of the Scottish Trades Union Congress (STUC) in late 2007.

Henderson has also been active as a campaigner for women more generally, taking up a position with the Women's Aid Organisation in 1996 and serving on the UNIFEM UK Board from 2002-2005.

Henderson was employed as a researcher and parliamentary assistant to Susan Deacon MSP in the Scottish Parliament, where she also served as Scottish Commissioner on the Women's National Commission from 2008-2010. Henderson was an active member of Campaign for Socialism, an autonomous pressure group of Scottish Labour Party members and stood in the 2016 Scottish Parliament election as a Labour Party candidate for the Lothian electoral region. She was shortlisted as a Labour Party candidate for the Morningside ward in the 2017 City of Edinburgh Council election.

In February 2018, Henderson was voted Rector of the University of Edinburgh, becoming the second woman to hold the position following Muriel Gray. She beat the only other candidate, Marco Bauder, with 77% of the vote. She replaced the outgoing Rector, Steve Morrison. In 2021, it was announced Henderson would leave the role by March 1, with Debora Kayembe set to take over her role.

In June 2021, the Times reported that Henderson had been falsely accused of transphobia by students at Edinburgh University, and that Henderson said that she had been the target of an abusive campaign after calling for reasoned debate on gender recognition reforms.

Academic offices
Preceded by Steve Morrison	Rector of the University of Edinburgh; 2018–2021	Succeeded by Debora Kayembe
