= Simon Fanshawe =

English writer, activist and broadcaster

Simon Fanshawe OBE
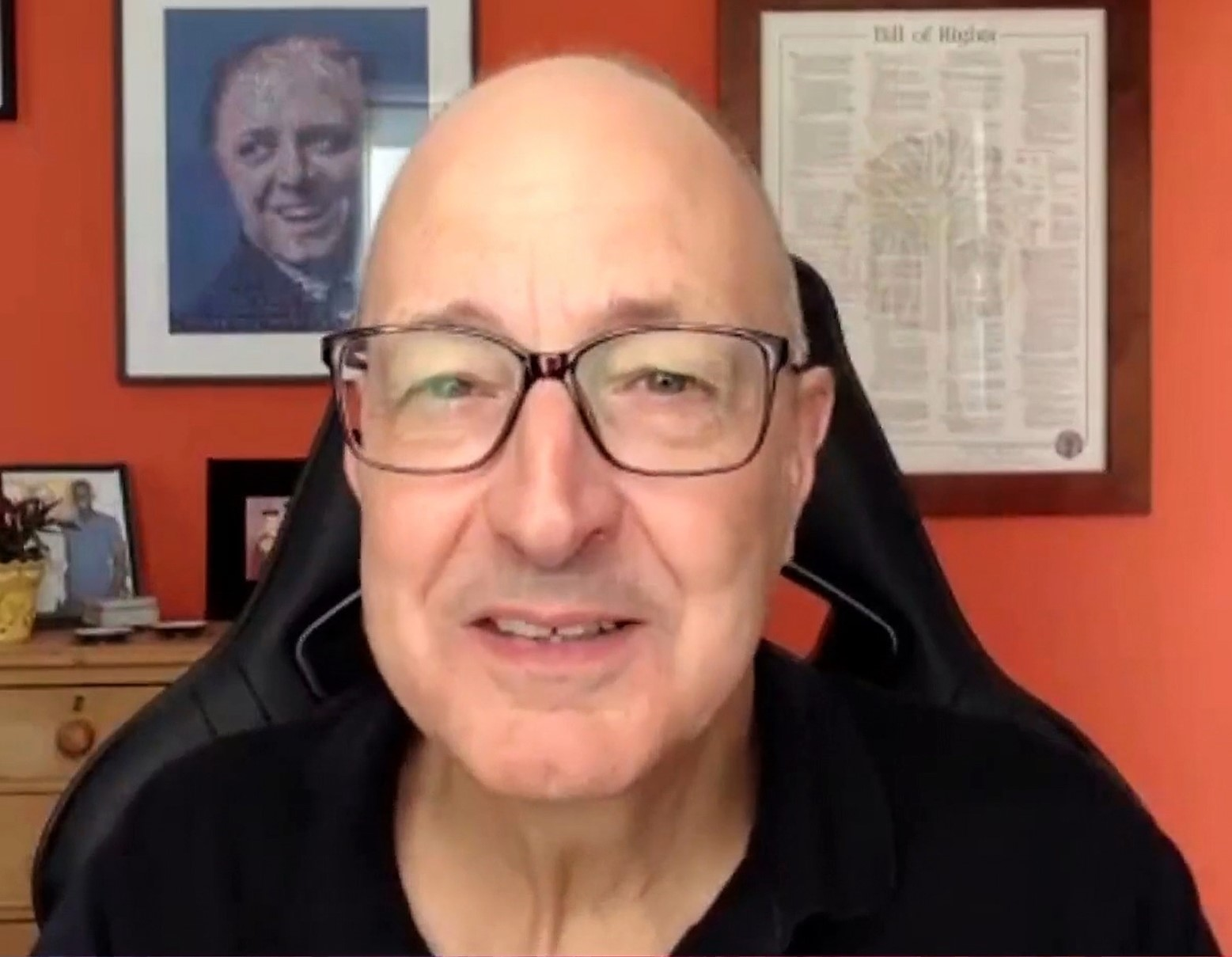
- Fanshawe in 2021

Lord Rector of the University of Edinburgh
- Incumbent
- Assumed office 4 March 2024
- Preceded by: Debora Kayembe

Personal details
- Born: 26 December 1956 (age 69) Devizes, England
- Education: Chafyn Grove School; Marlborough College; University of Sussex
- Occupation: Writer, activist and broadcaster

Simon Hew Dalrymple Fanshawe OBE (born 26 December 1956) is an English writer, activist and broadcaster. He contributes frequently to British newspapers, television and radio. Fanshawe is also now a consultant and non-executive director of public and private organisations. He was one of the founders of the LGBT charity Stonewall, and won the Perrier Comedy Award in 1989. In 2019, Fanshawe became one of the supporters of the initiative that led to the formation of the LGB Alliance.

== Career ==
Fanshawe first came to public attention as a comedian in the early 1980s. In 1984, he appeared on the Channel 4 comedy sketch/stand-up show The Entertainers, which showcased up-and-coming comedy talent, and later that year appeared in his comedy act Three of a Different Kind at the Edinburgh Festival Fringe. Following a nomination in 1987, he later won the prestigious Perrier Comedy Award in 1989. He had a stint as a presenter on the BBC television programme That's Life! in 1990.

Alongside working in comedy, Fanshawe has been a frequent contributor on a variety of subjects from arts to politics in newspapers and on many BBC radio and TV programmes. His BBC Radio 4 profile light-heartedly describes him as a "media tart".

Fanshawe has been involved in many community and campaigning groups and public bodies – often as a board member. He led the successful campaign to make Brighton and Hove a city in 2000. He was the chairman of the board for the Brighton Festival Fringe and is on the board of the Edinburgh Fringe. He founded and chaired the economic strategy body of his home town, The Brighton & Hove Economic Partnership. He was chairman of Brighton & Hove Local Radio Ltd from 1996 to 2000, when the company was acquired by Forever Broadcasting.

In 2006, Fanshawe made the documentary The Trouble with Gay Men, shown on BBC Three.

Fanshawe was a co-founder of the LGBT charity Stonewall.

In 2007, Fanshawe presented the first programme in the BBC's Building Britain series, concentrating his attentions on the key role of developers in making cities over the last two centuries.

In 2017, Fanshawe presented the BBC documentary Brighton: 50 Years of Gay in which he examined the landmark Sexual Offences Act 1967, which decriminalised male homosexual acts in England and Wales, and its effect on the population of the city of Brighton and Hove.

In 2019, he publicly broke with Stonewall due to its "intolerance of disagreement and discussion" and helped found the LGB Alliance later that year.

On 13 February 2024, Fanshawe was confirmed as Rector of the University of Edinburgh. Only one valid nomination was received for an election to this position, resulting in Fanshawe being named as Rector uncontested. Fanshawe's appointment has been criticised by the University's Staff Pride Network, a network of LGBT+ staff and post-graduate research students and allies, who have called for his removal from the position and for a new election to be called. Edinburgh Academics for Academic Freedom supported his appointment, saying he was appointed "following due process and according to rules that are clearly set out on the University's website" and was "the perfect person for the role". On 21 February the Trans and Non-Binary Liberation Officer at the University’s Student Association, Robyn Woof, resigned from her positions within the Association and on the University's Equality, Diversity and Inclusion Committee, citing Fanshawe's appointment as one of several reasons for her resignation.

== Personal life ==
Fanshawe was educated at two independent boarding schools in Wiltshire: Chafyn Grove School in Salisbury, and Marlborough College in Marlborough, followed by the University of Sussex near Brighton, where he studied law. He was chair of the university's governing council from 2007 to 2013. He was appointed OBE in the 2013 New Year Honours for services to higher education.

Fanshawe lives in the Kemp Town area of Brighton with his husband, Adam, who is from Nigeria.

== Newspapers and magazines ==
Fanshawe has contributed articles to the following publications:

- The Guardian
- The Observer
- The Sunday Times
- The Daily Telegraph
- Evening Standard
- Time Out
- Punch

== Radio ==
Fanshawe has been a presenter or contributor on the following radio programmes:

- Kaleidoscope
- Sunday Brunch
- Fanshawe on Five
- The Reference Library
- Live From London
- Fanshawe Gets to the Bottom Of...
- Loose Ends
- The Motion Show

== Television ==
- That's Life!, a BBC television light entertainment series. A humour contributor, for one series only, in 1990.
- Thames Roadshow
- Cabaret at the Jongleurs
- Brighton: 50 Years of Gay (2017)

== Bibliography ==
- Fanshawe, Simon (2005), The done thing, Century, ISBN 978-1-84413-873-9, OCLC 57693237
- Fanshawe, Simon; Ltd, BBC Audiobooks (2007), Bridging the gap, BBC Audiobooks, ISBN 978-1-4056-0949-4, archived from the original (Audiobook) on 8 July 2011
- Fanshawe, Simon (2007), "Manners: Moral authority", New Statesman, New Statesman Ltd: 50, ISSN 1364-7431, OCLC 133449672

Academic offices
Preceded by Debora Kayembe	Rector of the University of Edinburgh; 2024–present	Incumbent
