= Jonathan W. G. Wills =

Jonathan Witney Garriock Wills (born 17 June 1947, in Oxford), is a Scottish journalist, author and former editor of The Shetland Times newspaper. In 1996, Wills's company was sued by the newspaper for deep linking.

== Career ==
Wills is chiefly famous for his involvement in a notable lawsuit in 1996 brought against him as publisher of The Shetland News website. The plaintiff in the case, The Shetland Times, accused Wills' company, Zetnews Ltd., of infringing their copyright by using hyperlinks which bypassed their main webpage. Using so-called "deep linking", Wills bypassed the framework that the Times used to publish news articles on its website, specifically the main page and the interspersed advertisements. The case was settled out of court with The Shetland News agreeing to acknowledge any Shetland Times story which appeared on its website.

Wills was a student at Edinburgh University in the 1960s, producing satirical cartoons for The Student newspaper. He was elected as the first student Rector of the University of Edinburgh in 1971.

He retired from journalism in 1998 and now concentrates on providing wild life tours by boat.

== Books by Jonathan Wills ==
- Old Rock – Shetland in pictures
- A Place in the Sun: Shetland and Oil, Mainstream, 1991
- Innocent Passage: The Wreck of the Tanker Braer, Mainstream Publishing, 1993
- The Travels of Magnus Pole, Chatto & Windus / Canongate Publishing, 1984
- Wilma Widdershins and the Muckle Tree: A Shetland Story, Bressabooks, 1991
- The Lands of Garth: A short history of Calback Ness, 1978

Academic offices
| Preceded by Kenneth Allsop | Rector of the University of Edinburgh; 1972–1973 | Succeeded by Gordon Brown |
