= Rector of the University of Edinburgh =

Elected office

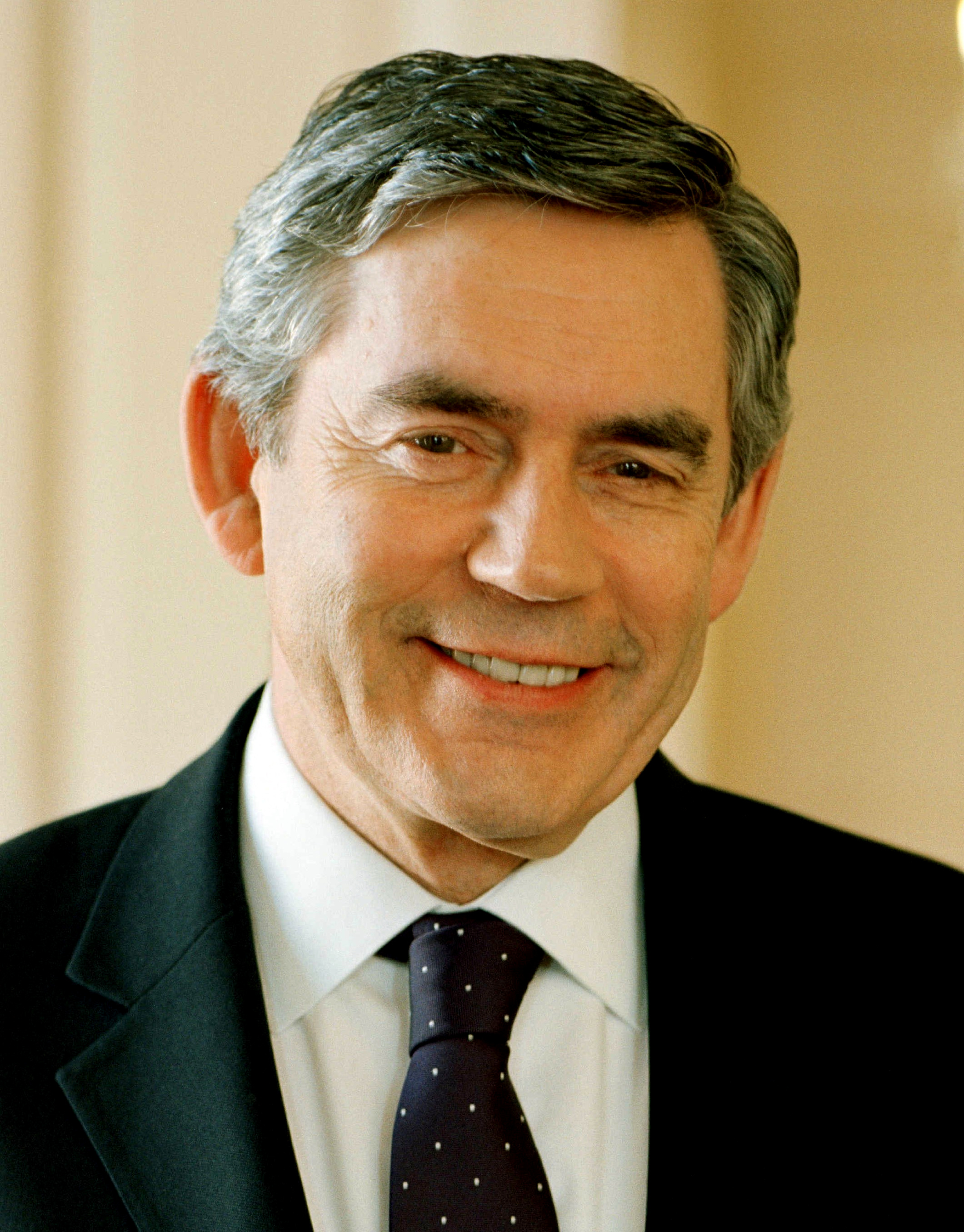
Gordon Brown, elected Rector while a student, later served as Prime Minister of the United Kingdom

The Lord Rector of The University of Edinburgh is elected every three years by the students and staff at The University of Edinburgh. Seldom referred to as Lord Rector, the incumbent is more commonly known just as the Rector.

== Role ==
The rector chairs the university's highest governing body, the University Court; in addition the rector chairs meetings of the general council in the absence of the chancellor. In more recent years the role has included a function akin to that of an ombudsperson for the university community. In their position, the rector can exert considerable influence in court and in the body politic of the university. They can be well informed about student and staff issues and concerns, can champion their causes, and can make sure that these issues are fully aired in court.

== History ==
The position of rector, along with the positions of chancellor and vice-chancellor, was only created in 1858. Prior to this, the university was governed by the lord provost, magistrates, and town council of Edinburgh. The rector's place in the university was codified by statute of the Westminster Parliament, the Universities (Scotland) Act 1889, which provided for the election of a Rector at all universities then in existence in Scotland. To this day only the ancient universities of St Andrews, Glasgow, Aberdeen and Edinburgh plus the newer Dundee, elect a rector; the 20th-century universities do not.

In 1935 students went to great lengths to invite Russian revolutionary Leon Trotsky to become Rector. Trotsky turned down the offer, stating "The elections to the rectorate are conducted on a non-political basis and your letter itself is signed by representatives of every political tendency. But I myself occupy too definite a political position. … [I could not] appear on any public tribune not under the Bolshevik banner."

Successful candidates are typically well-known figures with some connection to the city. Gordon Brown was unusual in being elected at the age of 21 while still a student, several years before he became politically prominent.

== List of rectors ==
=== Rectors in the 17th century ===
The post of rector was separated from that of Principal in 1620.

- 1620 Andrew Ramsay (1st term, resigned 1626)
- 1627 Sir Alexander Morison
- 1631 Vacant
- 1640 Alexander Henderson
- 1646 Andrew Ramsay (2nd term, ejected 1648)
- 1649 Robert Douglas

In 1665, the Town Council of Edinburgh resolved that the role of Rector should rest thereafter with the Lord Provost of Edinburgh.

(The then Lord Provost was Andrew Ramsay, son of Andrew Ramsay, who had served twice as rector.)

=== Rectors since the Universities (Scotland Act) 1858 ===
The position of rector was recreated by the Universities (Scotland Act) 1858. Rectors of the university have been:

- 1859 William Ewart Gladstone MP
- 1865 Thomas Carlyle
- 1868 Sir James Moncreiff Bt
- 1871 Sir William Stirling-Maxwell Bt MP
- 1874 Edward Stanley, 15th Earl of Derby
- 1877 Spencer Cavendish, 8th Duke of Devonshire MP
- 1880 Archibald Primrose, 5th Earl of Rosebery
- 1883 Stafford Northcote, 1st Earl of Iddesleigh Bt MP (from 1885 Earl of Iddesleigh)
- 1887 Schomberg Kerr, 9th Marquess of Lothian
- 1890 George Goschen, 1st Viscount Goschen MP
- 1893 James Robertson, Baron Robertson QC
- 1896 Alexander Bruce, 6th Lord Balfour of Burleigh
- 1899 Frederick Hamilton-Temple-Blackwood, 1st Marquess of Dufferin and Ava
- 1902 Sir Robert Finlay, 1st Viscount Finlay MP
- 1905 Richard Haldane, 1st Viscount Haldane MP
- 1908 George Wyndham MP
- 1911 Gilbert Elliot-Murray-Kynynmound, 4th Earl of Minto
- 1914 Field Marshal Herbert Kitchener, 1st Earl Kitchener
- 1917 Admiral Sir David Beatty (promoted Admiral of the Fleet in May 1919 and created Earl Beatty in Oct. 1919).
- 1920 David Lloyd George MP
- 1923 Stanley Baldwin MP
- 1926 Sir John Gilmour Bt MP
- 1929 Winston Churchill MP
- 1932 General Sir Ian Hamilton
- 1935 Field Marshal Edmund Allenby, 1st Viscount Allenby
- 1936 Sir H. J. C. Grierson
- 1939 Sir John Donald Pollock
- 1945 Admiral of the Fleet Andrew Cunningham, 1st Viscount Cunningham of Hyndhope
- 1948 Alastair Sim
- 1951 Sir Alexander Fleming
- 1954 Sir Sydney A. Smith
- 1957 James Robertson Justice
- 1960 Jo Grimond MP
- 1963 James Robertson Justice
- 1966 Malcolm Muggeridge (resigned 1968)
- 1968 Kenneth Allsop
- 1971 Jonathan W. G. Wills
- 1972 Gordon Brown
- 1975 Magnus Magnusson
- 1979 Fr. Anthony Ross
- 1982 David Steel MP
- 1985 Archie Macpherson
- 1988 Muriel Gray
- 1991 Donnie Munro
- 1994 Malcolm Macleod
- 1997 John Mark Colquhoun
- 2000 Robin Harper MSP
- 2003 Sir Tam Dalyell Bt MP
- 2006 Mark Ballard MSP
- 2009 Iain Macwhirter
- 2012 Peter McColl
- 2015 Steve Morrison
- 2018 Ann Henderson
- 2021 Debora Kayembe
- 2024 Simon Fanshawe

== See also ==
- Ancient university governance in Scotland
- Chancellor of the University of Edinburgh
- Principal of the University of Edinburgh

== Bibliography ==
- "List of rectors". Previously Answered Reference Questions. Edinburgh University Library.
- "List of chancellors". Previously Answered Reference Questions. Edinburgh University Library.
- Wintersgill, Donald (2005). The Rectors of The University of Edinburgh 1859–2000. Dunedin Academic Press. ISBN 1-903765-44-7.
