= Anthony Ross (priest) =

Scottish Catholic priest

Fr Ian Anthony Ross OP STL FSA (Scot) (14 June 1917 – 24 May 1993) was a Scottish born Catholic priest and member of The Order of Preachers (Dominican). He was also a noted broadcaster, writer, community activist, educator and antiquarian who served as Rector of the University of Edinburgh (1979–1982).

== Early life ==
Born near Beauly, Inverness-shire, Scotland, Anthony Ross was brought up Free Presbyterian, attending school in Beauly and then Inverness Royal Academy. He won an award to Edinburgh University, where he edited his first book at the age of twenty-two. On converting to Catholicism while an undergraduate, he was cut off financially by his family. He entered the Order of Preachers (Dominican Order, Blackfriars, Ordo Praedicatorum) as a novice in 1939 at Woodchester, Gloucestershire in 1939, made his profession on 19 October 1940, and was ordained priest on 29 September 1945. An autobiography, The Root of The Matter: Boyhood, Manhood & God, (Mainstream 1989), deals with his early life prior to joining the Order of Preachers.

== Career ==
After obtaining his lectorate he returned to Edinburgh in 1947 to begin postgraduate studies on the Order in Scotland after the Reformation. However, in 1950 he was assigned to teach at Hawkesyard. He was elected Prior of Woodchester a year later and then in 1954 went to Laxton Hall where he was a popular teacher. Returning to Edinburgh in 1959, he exerted wide influence throughout Scotland. Fr Ross was a pivotal figure in setting up a number of important and radical initiatives in Edinburgh to deal with the problem of homelessness in the late 1960s and 1970s, notably The Skippers Cafe in the Cowgate and The Edinburgh Cyrenians. He was the founder of The Innes Review and of the Scottish Catholic Historical Association and vice-chairman of the Parole Board for Scotland. In this latter role he was a key figure in the establishment and development of the Special Unit at HM Prison Barlinnie in Glasgow. In 1979 he was elected Rector of the University of Edinburgh.

Ross was a member of the Board of Governors of Lendrick Muir School, a specialist residential school for maladjusted children in [Rumbling Bridge].

== Later life ==
In 1982, he was elected Provincial, but six months later suffered a stroke. He bore the limitations on his activities with patience, re-learning to speak and to write. In 1988, he published an autobiography. He died peacefully at Blairgowrie, near Perth, aged 78, with 52 years of profession and 47 years of priesthood.

== Publications ==
- Ross, Iain editor 1940 "The Gude and Godlie Ballatis by John Wedderburn, Robert Wedderburn & James Wedderburn", Saltire Society, Oliver and Boyd, 1940
- Ross, Anthony OP, 1950 "Some Catholic Historians", Innes Review, 1950, Volume 1.
- Ross, Anthony OP, 1950 "The Position of The Innes Review", Innes Review, 1950, Volume 2.
- Ross, Anthony OP, 1955 "The Golden Man: Legends of saints, adapted from the golden legend of Jacobus de Voragine. Partly reprinted from The Life of the Spirit and The Rosary", London, 1955.
- Ross, Anthony OP & Durkan, John, 1958 "Early Scottish Libraries", Innes Review, 1958, Volume 9.
- Ross, Anthony OP, 1959 "Reformation and Repression", Innes Review, 1959, Volume 10.
- Ross, Anthony OP, 1963 "More about The Archbishop of Athens", Innes Review, 1963, Volume 14.
- Ross, Anthony OP, 1964 "Three Antiquaries: General Hutton, Bishop Geddes and The Earl of Buchan", Innes Review, 1964, Volume 15.
- Ross, Anthony OP & Walsh, P.G. "editor" 1966 "St. Thomas Aquinas:, Courage, Summa Theologiæ, Volume 42, (2a2ae. 123-40), Blackfriars in conjunction with Eyre & Spottiswoode and McGraw-Hill, New York, 1966.
- Ross, Anthony OP, 1969 "Libraries of The Scottish Blackfriars", Innes Review, 1969, Volume 20.
- Ross, Anthony OP & McRoberts, David, 1972 "Dominicans and Scotland in the Seventeenth Century", Innes Review, 1969, Volume 23.
- MacDiarmid, Hugh, Maclean, Campbell & Ross, Anthony OP, 1976 "John Knox: New Assessments", Ramsay Head Press, 1976
- Ross, Anthony OP, 1978 "The Development of the Modern Scottish Catholic Community 1878 -1978", Innes Review, 1978, Volume 29.
- Ross, Anthony OP, 1979, review of The Silent Scream by Larry Winters, in Cencrastus No. 1, Autumn 1979, pp. 7 & 8, ISSN 0264-0856
- Ross, Anthony OP, 1981 "The Dominican Order in Scotland", Order of Preachers, 1981.
- Ross, Anthony OP, 1983, review of The Special Unit Barlinnie Prison: Its Evolution through its Art, in Hearn, Sheila G. (ed.), Cencrastus No. 11, New Year 1983, p. 48, ISSN 0264-0856
- Ross, Anthony OP, 1989 "The Root of the Matter: Boyhood, Manhood and God", Mainstream Publishing, 1989.
- Ross, Anthony OP & McGonigal, James, 1995 "Encounters with Dominicans: recollections of Anthony Ross", Blackfriars Publications, 1995.

== Quotes ==
"We will attempt to make truth known without suppression or distortion, believing this to be not only a scientific but also a religious duty." ("The Position of The Innes Review", Vol. 2, Innes Review, 1950.)

"After what we have known recently of totalitarian ruthlessness, of gas chambers, the atom bomb, napalm, brain-washing and "double-think", the actions of sixteenth-century statesmen and soldiers can hardly shock us as they shocked our grandparents. We understand better now, perhaps, the recurrent perversions in human behaviour and the difficulties men have in dealing justly and humanely with swiftly moving events; the difficulty of knowing what should be tolerated when the safety of the commonweal is threatened; of distinguishing between sin and crime; of remembering the fundamental rights of another person when we are outraged in our own being by his deeds." ("Reformation and Repression", Vol. 10, Innes Review, 1958).

"Christianity if taken seriously is revolutionary in its effects on individuals and on societies. For most of our history it has been too often a tool of political interests, in return for support of its own institutional structures and property, acquiescing in the misery and injustice which it should have made impossible". (Resurrection an essay published in Whither Scotland?, ed. Duncan Gleb, Gollancz, 1971).

== Footnotes ==
Academic offices
Preceded by Magnus Magnusson	Rector of the University of Edinburgh; 1979–1982	Succeeded by David Steel
