= Kenneth Allsop =

British broadcaster, author and naturalist

- Born: 29 January 1920; Holbeck, Leeds, Yorkshire, England
- Died: 23 May 1973 (aged 53); West Milton, Dorset, England
- Occupations: Broadcaster, author and naturalist
- Writing career
- Period: 20th century

Kenneth Allsop (29 January 1920 – 23 May 1973) was a British broadcaster, author and naturalist.

== Early life ==
Allsop was born on 29 January 1920 in Holbeck, Leeds, West Riding of Yorkshire.

He was married in St Peter's Church, Ealing, in March 1942. He served in the R.A.F. in the Second World War and had a leg amputated after an injury on an assault course, which left him in constant pain.

== Career ==
In 1958 he wrote an account of 1950s British literature, The Angry Decade, at the end of which he remarked that: "In this technologically triumphant age, when the rockets begin to scream up towards the moon but the human mind seems at an even greater distance, anger has a limited use. Love has a wider application, and it is that which needs describing wherever it can be found so that we may all recognise it and learn its use."

Allsop was a regular reporter for the BBC current affairs programme Tonight during the 1960s. He was also Rector of Edinburgh University and won the John Llewellyn Rhys Prize.

He was an obvious choice as a guest in the first series of the long-running naturalist radio programme Sounds Natural on BBC Radio 4 on 24 May 1971.

== Death and legacy ==
The inquest into his death recorded an open verdict, despite having found that it was brought about by an overdose of barbiturates. He is buried at Powerstock in Dorset.

The Kenneth Allsop Memorial Trust, a registered charity, was launched in 1973 with an appeal for funds, at first intending to acquire and conserve Eggardon Hill in Dorset. Instead, in 1976 the trust bought the island of Steep Holm in the Bristol Channel for £10,000, and runs it as a nature reserve. The Sunday Times instituted a Kenneth Allsop Memorial Essay Competition, which took place annually until 1986. The Allsop Gallery, an exhibition space in Bridport Arts Centre, Dorset, is named after him.

== List of works ==
- The Sun Himself Must Die (1949)
- Silver Flame (1950)
- The Daybreak Edition (1951)
- The Last Voyages of the Mayflower (1955)
- The Angry Decade (1958)
- Rare Bird (1959)
- Question of Obscenity (1960) (with Robert Pitman)
- The Bootleggers (1961)
- Adventure Lit Their Star (1949) (the 1950 winner of the John Llewellyn Rhys Prize)
- Scan (collected journalism) 1965
- Strip Jack Naked (1972)
- Harriet Beecher Stowe (1971)
- Hard Travellin': The Hobo and his History (1967)
- In the Country (1973 and 2013)
- Letters to his Daughter (1974)
- One and All: Two Years in the Chilterns (1991)

Academic offices
Preceded by Malcolm Muggeridge	Rector of the University of Edinburgh; 1969–1972	Succeeded by Jonathan W. G. Wills
