= Leslie Spoor =

British politician (1910–2011)

Leslie Spoor (12 October 1910 – 13 March 2011) was a Scottish political activist and the principal founder of what became the Scottish Green Party.

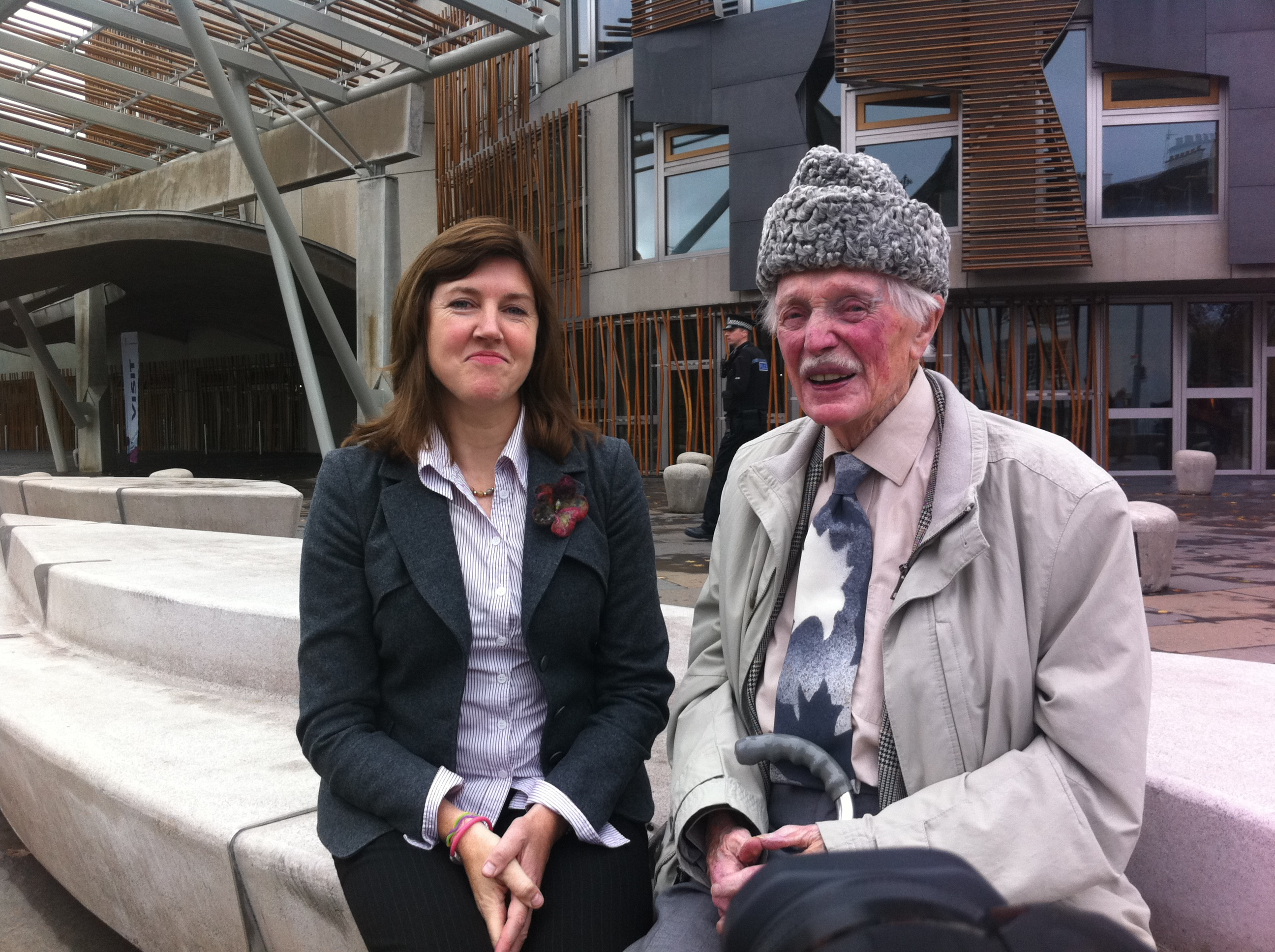
Future Green MSP and Presiding Officer Alison Johnstone and Leslie Spoor, aged 99, outside the Scottish Parliament in October 2010

Born in Durham and educated in Edinburgh and Dunfermline, Spoor became politically active while working in London in the 1930s, and was involved in the Battle of Cable Street. When the Second World War broke out he volunteered as a Stretcher Party Officer during the Blitz. After a move to Edinburgh he joined the Royal Air Force, serving out the war as a wireless operator at Drem airfield in East Lothian. After the war he attended the University of Edinburgh, where he studied history and then teaching. He taught at Musselburgh Grammar School, and was active in the Scottish Secondary Teachers Association and a leading player in developing Modern Studies – part of his desire to see politics taught in schools. He also lectured for the Open University and in 1964 left school teaching for the FE sector, joining the staff of Napier Technical College.

A long-term member of the Labour Party, Spoor was a close friend of Robin Cook. Spoor retired in 1975, and in 1978 hosted the first meeting of Scottish members of the Ecology Party. He oversaw the branch's campaign in Edinburgh South for the 1979 general election, and also served on the national executive. Spoor continued campaigning for what became the first UK-wide Green Party, then the independent Scottish Green Party until his death in 2011, aged 100.
