= Peter McColl =

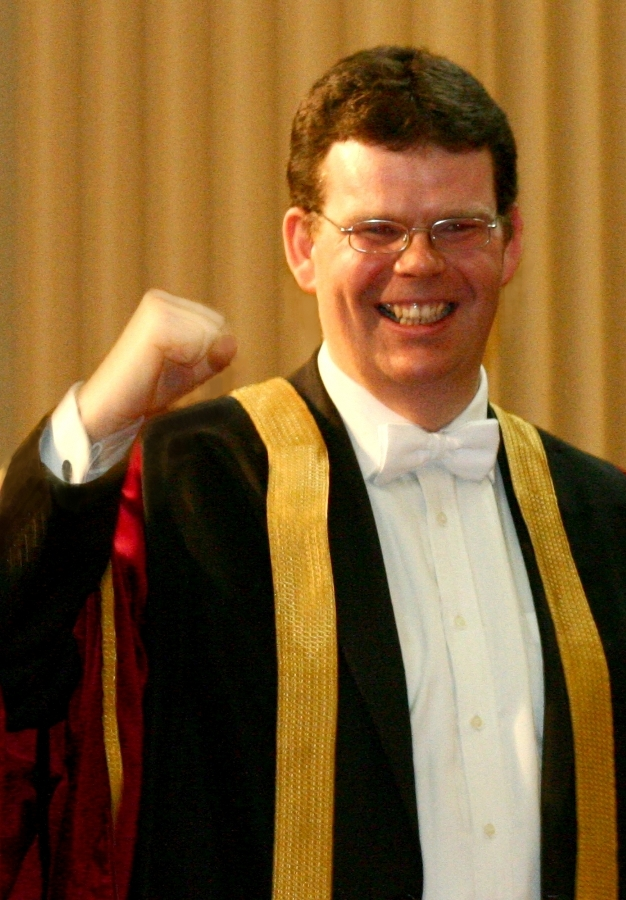
- McColl at his rectorial installation

Lord Rector of the University of Edinburgh
- In office 11 January 2012 – 11 February 2015
- Preceded by: Iain Macwhirter
- Succeeded by: Steve Morrison

Personal details
- Born: 9 May 1980 (age 46) Belfast, Northern Ireland
- Party: Scottish Green Party
- Education: University of Edinburgh
- Occupation: Charity worker
- Website: petermccoll.wordpress.com
- McColl's voice recorded October 2014

Peter McColl (born 9 May 1980) is a political campaigner and writer who was Rector of the University of Edinburgh 2012–2015. He has been involved with charity work and is editor of the progressive blog Bright Green.

== Early life ==
McColl was educated at Methodist College Belfast. McColl is a geography graduate of the University of Edinburgh and was previously a Vice President of the Edinburgh University Students Association. He was assessor to Mark Ballard during his term as Rector of the University from 2006–09, and was involved in the campaigns to elect both Robin Harper and Tam Dalyell as rector.

== Rectorship ==
McColl was confirmed as Rector of the University of Edinburgh on 11 January 2012, following an uncontested election. He took up the three-year post on 1 March 2012.

As Rector McColl supported successful campaigns to freeze international student fees; for more affordable student housing, including the establishment of the Edinburgh Student Housing Co-operative; for the University to divest from weaponised drone manufacturing and the wider arms trade; and to stop the University using zero hour contracts.

He also campaigned for better pay and conditions for academic and support staff, to improve teaching, for free education, for improved education funding, to improve university governance across Scotland, for fossil fuel divestment, and ethical procurement.

In 2015 McColl became the fourth Rector to stand for re-election. He lost to his opponent, media executive Steve Morrison, who won with 61.9% of the vote.

== Politics ==
McColl has stood as a Scottish Green Party candidate in several elections. In the 2007 local authority elections the Greens stood candidates in all Edinburgh council wards for the first time and won three seats, although McColl himself was unsuccessful in contesting the Portobello/Craigmillar ward. In 2010 he stood in the Liberton/Gilmerton ward by-election. and in the 2012 election for the Portobello/Craigmillar Ward but was again unsuccessful.

McColl was the Scottish Green Party 2015 Westminster parliamentary candidate for Edinburgh East, the party's national target seat. He was a candidate for Scottish Parliament on the Green's Lothian list for the in 2016.

He is an editor of the Bright Green blog, and was voted the UK's top Green blogger in the 2011 Total Politics poll. and 7th top left wing blogger.

Mccoll has also served as the Co-Chair of the Edinburgh Green Party and (until 2011) as Chair of climate action group Transition Scotland Support.

Academic offices
Preceded by Iain Macwhirter	Rector of the University of Edinburgh; 2012 – 2015	Succeeded by Steve Morrison
