= Steve Morrison (TV producer) =

Steve Morrison CBE

Lord Rector of the University of Edinburgh
- In office 11 February 2015 – 28 February 2018
- Preceded by: Peter McColl
- Succeeded by: Ann Henderson

Personal details
- Born: 3 March 1947 (age 79) Glasgow, Scotland
- Education: University of Edinburgh
- Occupation: TV producer

Steve Morrison CBE (born 3 March 1947) is a Scottish television producer and a former Rector of the University of Edinburgh.

== Early life ==
Morrison was born in Glasgow and studied Politics at the University of Edinburgh. In 1968, he became the first student to stand for the post of Rector. Following his studies at Edinburgh, Morrison attended the National Film and Television School.

Morrison played a founding role in the Third World First campaign group, which became the anti-poverty campaign group People & Planet.

== Career ==
Morrison become a radio producer with BBC Scotland. Morrison joined Granada Television in 1974. Here, he formed Granada Film before becoming Director of Programmes and, in 2001, Chief Executive. In 2003, Morrison co-founded independent TV production and distribution company all3media, becoming non-executive chairman in 2013. Morrison's production credits include My Left Foot, The Field and Jack and Sarah.

In 2015, Morrison was elected Rector of the University of Edinburgh, beating incumbent Peter McColl with 61.9% of votes.

Morrison sits on the advisory board of the Edinburgh College of Art. He is a former Governor of the British Film Institute.

In 2024 he donated £50,000 to the Labour Party.

Academic offices
Preceded by Peter McColl	Rector of the University of Edinburgh; 2015–2018	Succeeded by Ann Henderson
