= Reforesting Scotland =

Reforesting Scotland is a membership organisation concerned with the ecological and social regeneration of Scotland. It aims to significantly increase the forested areas of the country.

== History ==
Reforesting Scotland is an environmental charity established in 1991. Its founding directors were Bernard Planterose, Emma Planterose, Martin Howard and Donald McPhillimy. Its first development officer was Andy Wightman. In 2008, the organisation received support from Business Stream.

In May 1993, Reforesting Scotland organised a study tour to Hordaland in Norway to examine the Norwegian land use system to inform thinking on the future of land use in Scotland.

In 2011 it launched a campaign - A Thousand Huts - to encourage Scots to build huts for recreational use in woodland.

It is a Scottish charity (number SCO18032).

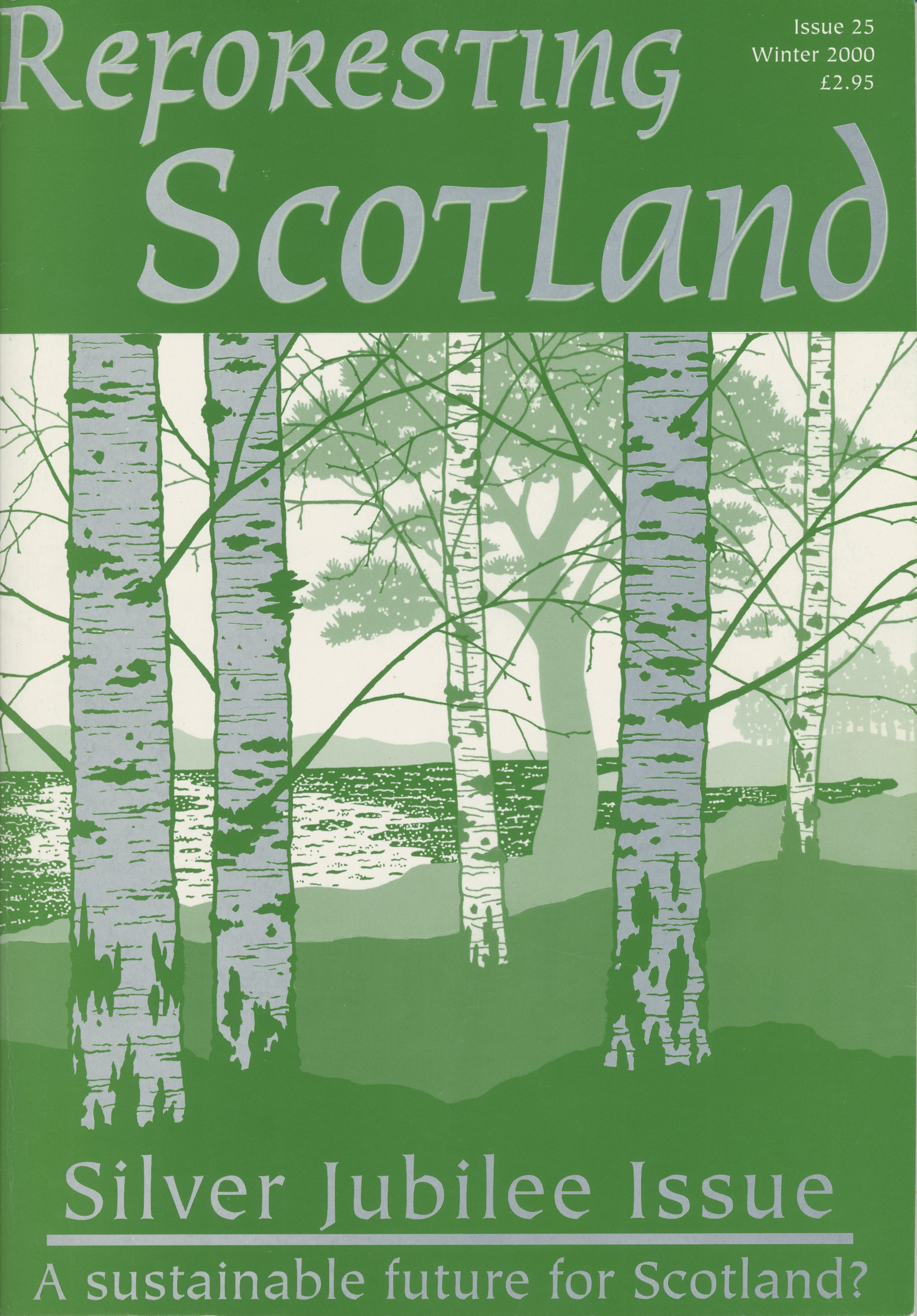
Reforesting Scotland No. 25, Winter 2000

== Journal ==
Reforesting Scotland grew out of the biannual journal The Tree Planter's Guide to the Galaxy launched by the editorial team of Bernard and Emma Planterose, Ron Greer and Martin Howard in the summer of 1989. The journal was renamed Reforesting Scotland from Issue 7 (Autumn 1992). Guest editorials were written by James Hunter, Iain Thomson, Justin Kendrick and Andy Wightman between 1992 and 1994. The journal was edited by Brendan Hill from 1994 to 1996, and by Karen Grant from 1996 to 1998. Mark Ballard was editor from 1999 to 2001. Dr. Mandy Meikle has edited Reforesting Scotland since the autumn of 2002. Regular contributors include Sally Macpherson, Fi Martynoga, Donald McPhillimy, Nick Marshall, Mandy Haggith and Robin Noble.
