= Mark Ballard =

British politician (born 1971)

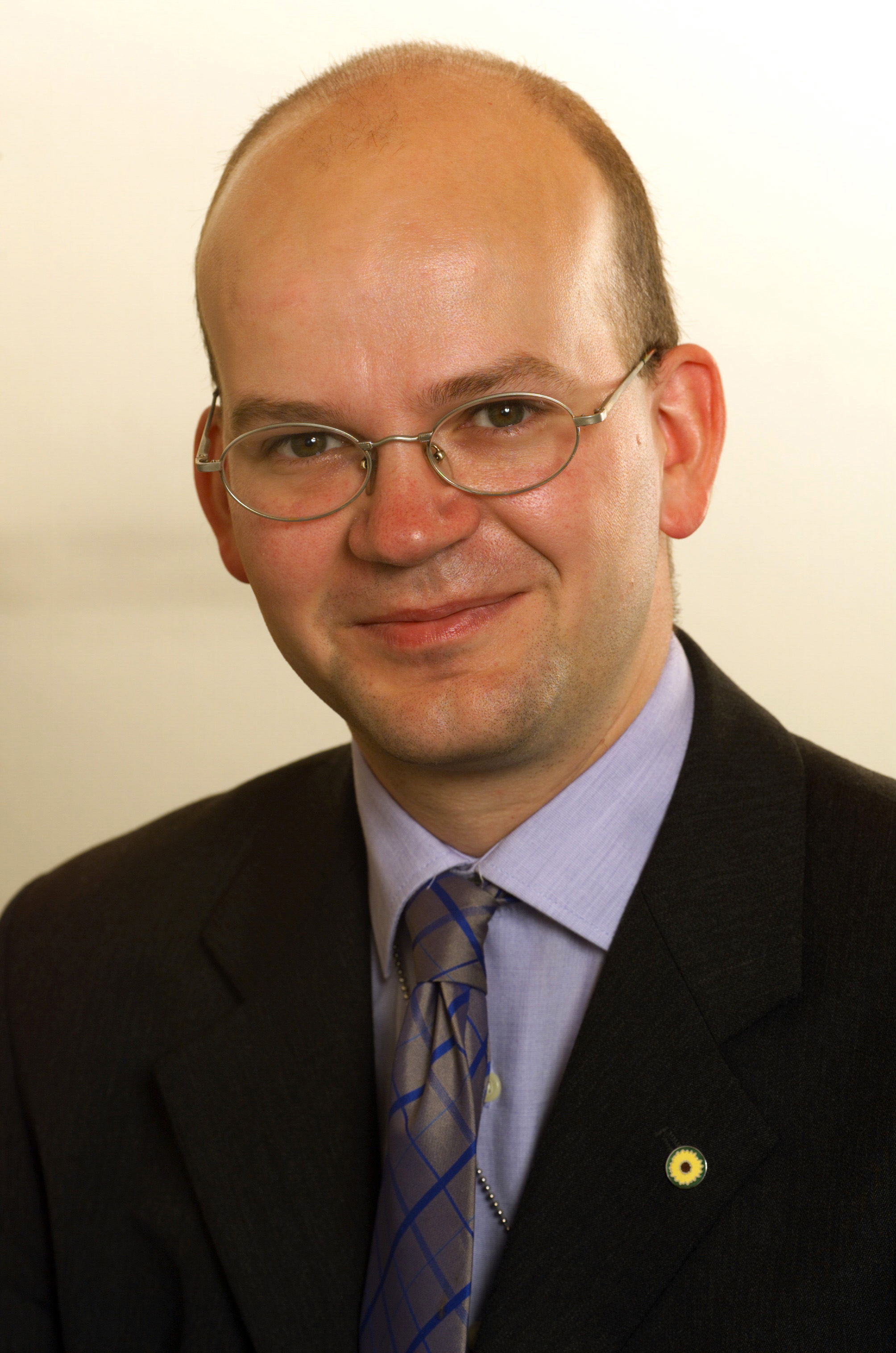

Lord Rector of the University of Edinburgh
- In office 16 February 2006 – 12 February 2009
- Preceded by: Tam Dalyell
- Succeeded by: Iain Macwhirter

Member of the Scottish Parliament for Lothians (1 of 7 Regional MSPs)
- In office 1 May 2003 – 2 April 2007

Personal details
- Born: 27 June 1971 (age 55) Leeds, England
- Party: Scottish Green
- Education: University of Edinburgh

Mark Ballard (born 27 June 1971) is a former Scottish Green Party politician. He was a Member of the Scottish Parliament (MSP) for the Lothians region from 2003 to 2007, and co-convener of the Edinburgh Green Party from 2007 to 2010. He was Lord Rector of the University of Edinburgh from 2006 to 2009, and now works for the National Deaf Children's Society

== Early life ==
Ballard was born in Leeds, England on 27 June 1971. During his childhood he lived in Punjab, India (1973–1975) and Islamabad, Pakistan (1984–1985).

== Education and early career ==
He attended Lawnswood School in Leeds before going on to the University of Edinburgh, where he graduated with an MA (Hons) in Economic and Social History. He is a life member of the Edinburgh University Union, part of the Edinburgh University Students Association (EUSA).

Between 1994 and 1998 he worked for European Youth Forest Action (now European Youth For Action) in Edinburgh and Amsterdam. From 1999 until 2001 he worked as editor of the journal Reforesting Scotland before setting up an environmental communications consultancy company that ran until 2003.

== Political career ==
He joined the youth wing of the Labour Party when he was 15 and remained a member until 1991. At this point he became involved in the Scottish Green Party's student movement. He ran as a candidate for this party in the 1995 council elections, the 1999 Scottish Parliamentary election and a 2001 council by-election. He was first elected in the 2003 Holyrood election, as the second Green MSP in the Lothians.

He was a member of the Scottish Parliament Finance Committee and was also substitute member of the Enterprise and Culture Committee. He committed substantial time to promoting social enterprises and co-operatives, as a Green alternative to the current system. He also used the position to call for sustainable procurement guidelines, support ethical investment campaigns, and make the case for Scottish utilities being in public ownership.

As the Green speaker on Transport, Ballard supported campaigns against the Dalkeith by-pass and the M74, for the trams in Edinburgh and for a better and cheaper public transport system. As a Lothians MSP he helped raise awareness of community initiatives such as the campaign to resist a huge superstore development in Portobello, supporting the calls for congestion charging in Edinburgh, assisting universities wanting to make the switch to Fairtrade and opposing tuition fees for students. The latter in particular helped him win support amongst Edinburgh's student community.

== Campaigning work ==
Ballard has also been involved in direct action campaigning, most notably against British nuclear weapons on the River Clyde at Faslane. He was arrested at Faslane several times, as part of the CND 'Big Blockade', and in August 2004 he and three other MSPs were among dozens of protesters arrested. He was involved in a long-running court case over the destruction of a field of rapeseed at the Roslin Institute near Dalkeith in 1999. Although initially found guilty of "wilfully and recklessly" destroying plants belonging to Monsanto Company, all charges were quashed due to a delay in the hearing of the appeal, which Mr Ballard claimed was because the Crown was unable to provide relevant evidence.

Ballard's Parliamentary Register of Interests indicated that he held membership of several organisations, including: Friends of the Earth, Sustrans, Campaign for Nuclear Disarmament, Democratic Left Scotland, Reforesting Scotland, Water of Leith Conservation Trust, Friends of Inverleith Park, SSPCA, Advocates for Animals and Scottish Education and Action for Development. Until 2005 he was also an unpaid director of UK charity Seeds for Change, treasurer of the Scottish Environmental Festivals association and is on the editorial board of the Scottish Left Review, a bi-monthly cross-party journal of the Scottish left.

== Rector of the University of Edinburgh ==
In February 2006 he stood for election as Rector of the University of Edinburgh standing against MP for Henley Boris Johnson, pro-Palestine journalist John Pilger and former Scotsman editor Magnus Linklater. The profile of the Rectorial election had been raised by Johnson's candidature.

The election took place on 15 and 16 February 2006, with a record turn out of almost 8000. A system of Single Transferable Vote was used. In the final round Mark Ballard received 3,597 votes against Magnus Linklater's 3,052 and was elected.

He was formally installed on 9 June 2006 in a ceremony in the university's Old College. Present at this ceremony were the Chancellor of the university, HRH Prince Philip, Duke of Edinburgh, the University Vice-Chancellor and Principal, Professor Timothy O'Shea, and Mark Ballard's predecessor as Rector, Labour MP Tam Dalyell. In this capacity he worked on issues of concern to students and university staff, including playing a prominent role in the movement which led to the complete abolishing of student tuition fees in Scotland in 2008.

He was succeeded as Rector in 2009 by journalist Iain Macwhirter, whose campaign drew on many of Ballard's supporters.

== Career after Parliament ==
After the 2007 election, Ballard became head of communications at the Scottish Council for Voluntary Organisations, then was assistant director of Barnardo's in Scotland for eight years, before becoming Director of Strategy at Chest Heart and Stroke Scotland. In November 2017, he became Head of Save the Children in Scotland. He currently works for the National Deaf Children's Society.

== Personal life ==
Ballard has two children.

== Selected articles by Mark Ballard ==
- Last Word: New Challenges for the Greens in Holyrood, in Meikle, Mandy (ed.), Reforesting Scotland Issue 30, Autumn 2003, p. 54.
- Charities face tough times while businesses get aid The Herald, 24 July 2009
- Can Local tax Ever be Fair? Scottish Left Review
- Vote for us! "Scottish Left Review"

== Books ==
- Robert McGeachy and Mark Ballard, The Public Affairs Guide to Scotland: Influencing Policy and Legislation, Welsh Academic Press, 2017 ISBN 9781860571268

Academic offices
Preceded by Tam Dalyell	Rector of the University of Edinburgh; 2006–2009	Succeeded by Iain Macwhirter
