= The Regenting System (Edinburgh) =

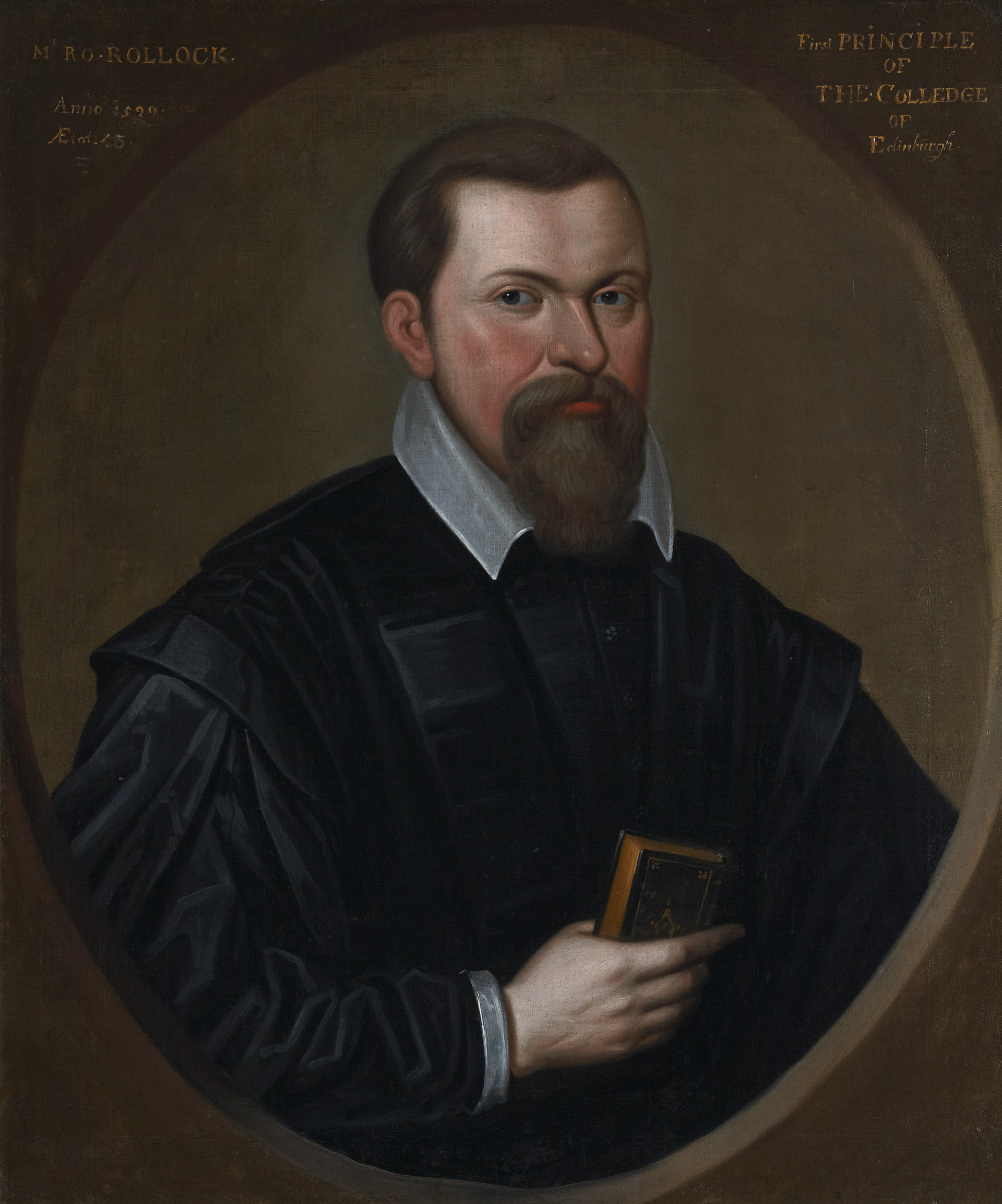
Robert Rollock, the first Principal and Regent of the University of Edinburgh.

The Regenting system was one of the defining features of the Ancient Universities of Scotland. The system of 'regenting' denotes teachers who taught the same class of students in every subject throughout their entire Master of Arts. These Regents recused themselves from examining their own class in order to avoid accusations of favouritism. Following the graduation of a class, having completed a four year degree, the cycle of 'regenting' would commence again with the start of a new class consisting of 'Bajani' (first year students) taught by the Regent.

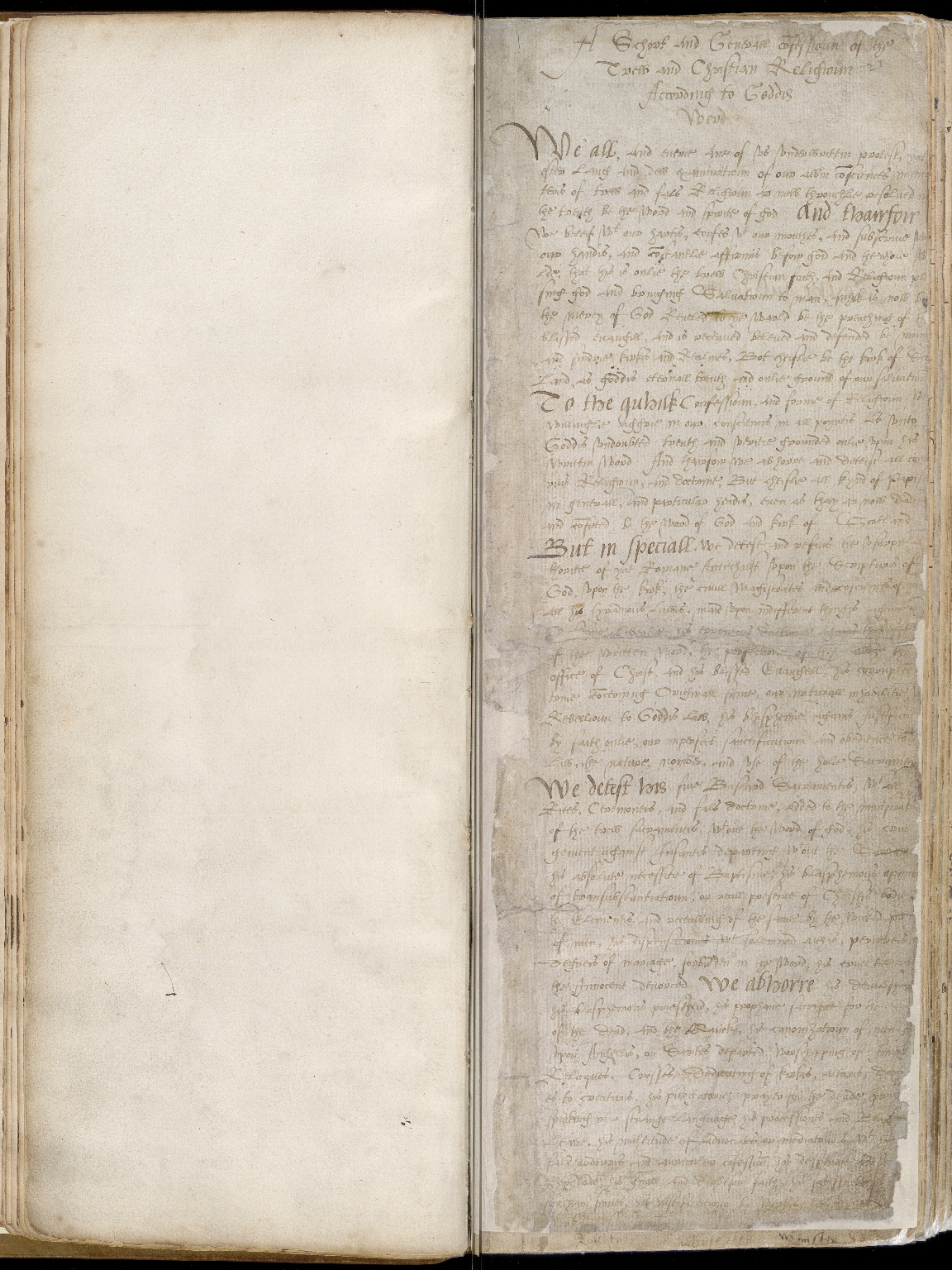
Hand-written frontispiece to earliest University Laureation (graduation) Register.

== History ==
In 1583, on the 14th of October, The 'Town's College' of Edinburgh opened, and with it the system of regenting year by year began in that University. From this point forward the apponinted Regents were, typically, those who had recently graduated from the University provided they had undergone a public 'trial', that is, an examination of their Latin held by representatives of the Town Council. The University historian and Principal Sir Alexander Grant notes that this procedure is largely analogous to the election, following examination, of graduates from Oxford and Cambridge to be Tutors and Fellows of their Colleges.

The first year students were termed 'Bajani' which Principal John Lee thought to derive from the Latin Pagani, and so 'rustics requiring to be civilised or humanised though enlisted among the cives academici; in the same manner as the name pagani was anciently given to the Roman conscripts or raw recruit'. However, this academic term actually came from the University of Paris, where the form differed, but where incoming students paid a fee called the Bejaunium seu iucundus adventus. The second class in this system were named 'Semies', that is, 'Semi-Bajans', in third year either 'Bachelors' (bas chevalier) or 'Determinands', and finally in the fourth year 'Magistrands', that is, students about to become Magistri. Those who graduated were said to have 'laureated' with their MA.

The Bajan class studied Latin and Greek, committing large portions of Cicero and Homer to memory, along with producing 'versions', that is, translations. The Semi-Bajans moved on to Greek and Latin Rhetoric, and then Arithmetic. The Bachelors read a Hebrew Grammar and Anatomy. The Magistrands repeated all that had come before and were then taught elements of Astronomy and Cosmology. Notably, this deviated from the prior Medieval degrees of Scotland by demanding Greek as part of the MA (where one had once studied Aristotle only in Latin translations) and in modernising the curriculum by introducing Cosmography and Anatomy. The first class at Edinburgh, taught by Regent and Principal Robert Rollock, laureated in 1587.

== The First Regents (1583-1600) ==
- Robert Rollock (1583), Principal in 1586 and Professor of Theology
- Duncan Nairne (1583)
- Charles Lumisden (1586), who retired that same year.
- Adam Colt (1586)
- Alexander Scrimger (1586), removed by the Principal in 1589 for 'misconduct'.
- Philip Heslope (1586), called to be minister of Inveresk in 1590.
- Charles Fermes (1589)
- Henry Charteris (1589), later Principal and Professor of Theology.
- Patrick Sands (1589), later Principal (not being a theologian, the Divinity chair was created)
- John Ray (1589), as Regent of Humanity.
- George Robertson (1593)
- James Knox (1598)
- John Adamson (1598)
- Robert Scott (1599)
- Adam Young (1599)

== Carstares' reforms ==
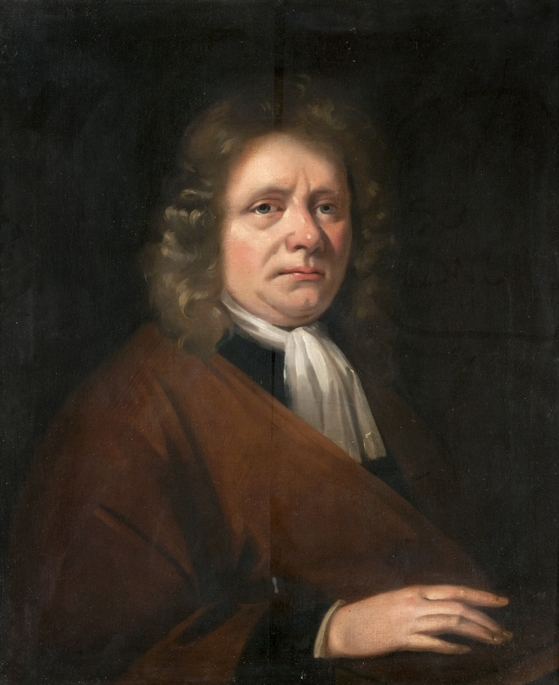
William Carstares, Principal from 1703-15.

In 1703 William Carstares was appointed Principal of the University of Edinburgh. Influenced by the European universities and particularly those of the United Provinces (owing to his exile in the Netherlands), Carstares sought to abolish the regenting system in favour of 'Dutch' style professors (esp. those of the Universities of Leiden and Utrecht), that is, assigned and established Chairs who would teach each of the subjects in the curriculum across the year groups. The inaugural Chairs were offered to the existing Regents in order of their seniority.

During Carstares' tenure as Principal the following Chairs were established:

- Charles Erskine as Regius Professor of Public Law and the Law of Nature and Nations (1707)
- William Scott Primus as Professor of Greek (1708)
- Laurence Dundas as Professor of Humanity (1708)
- Colin Drummond as Professor of Logic and Metaphysics (1708)
- William Law as Professor of Moral Philosophy (1708)
- James Craig as Professor of Civil Law (1710)
- Chair of Chemistry (1713) (founded as 'Chair of Physik and Chymistry' where 'physik' = medicine)

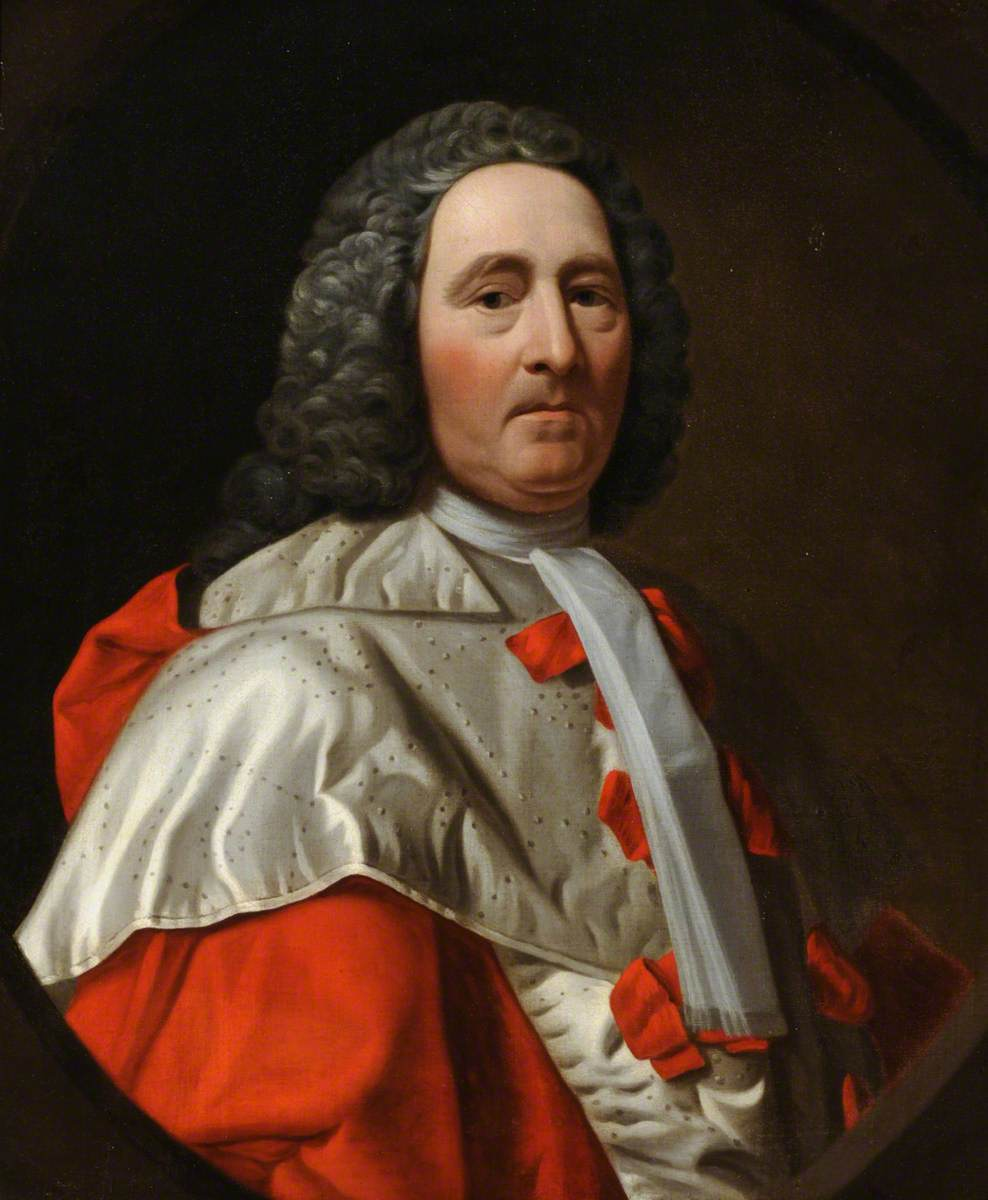
Charles Erskine, Lord Tinwald, Regent of Humanity and the inaugural Professor under Carstares' reforms.

The first Chair of Carstares' reforms, that of Law, actually resulted from a sign manual issued by Queen Anne, amending the terms of an annual grant of £300 awarded by William III. Previously, the grant funded twenty bursaries in Theology in order to ensure a supply of ministers for the established Church of Scotland. Anne's sign manual stated that this purpose had been met, and instructed that £150 should now be employed from the grant to create a Chair of 'Public Law and the Law of Nature and Nations'. This resulted in a reduction of Theology bursaries to five, and the appointment of Charles Erskine, then a Regent of Philosophy, as the first Regius Professor of Law. University historians Dalzell, Bower and Emerson have all suggested that the creation of this Chair largely owed itself to Erskine's influence at Court, and ultimately functioned as a sinecure for him. Indeed, the Town Council of Edinburgh protested against the decision, and Erskine did not commence teaching until 1711.

With the creation of the Faculty of Arts in 1708, the University now consisted of four (or, arguably, three) Faculties:

- Divinity, founded in 1620.
- Law, founded in 1710 (although the first Chair was appointed in 1707 it is only with James Craig's appointment to the newly created Chair of Civil law can it indubitably be said the Faculty existed).
- Arts, founded in 1708.
- Philosophy, (1694/1703), but contested by the Town Council.
