= David Aikinhead =

Scottish lawyer (1566-1637)

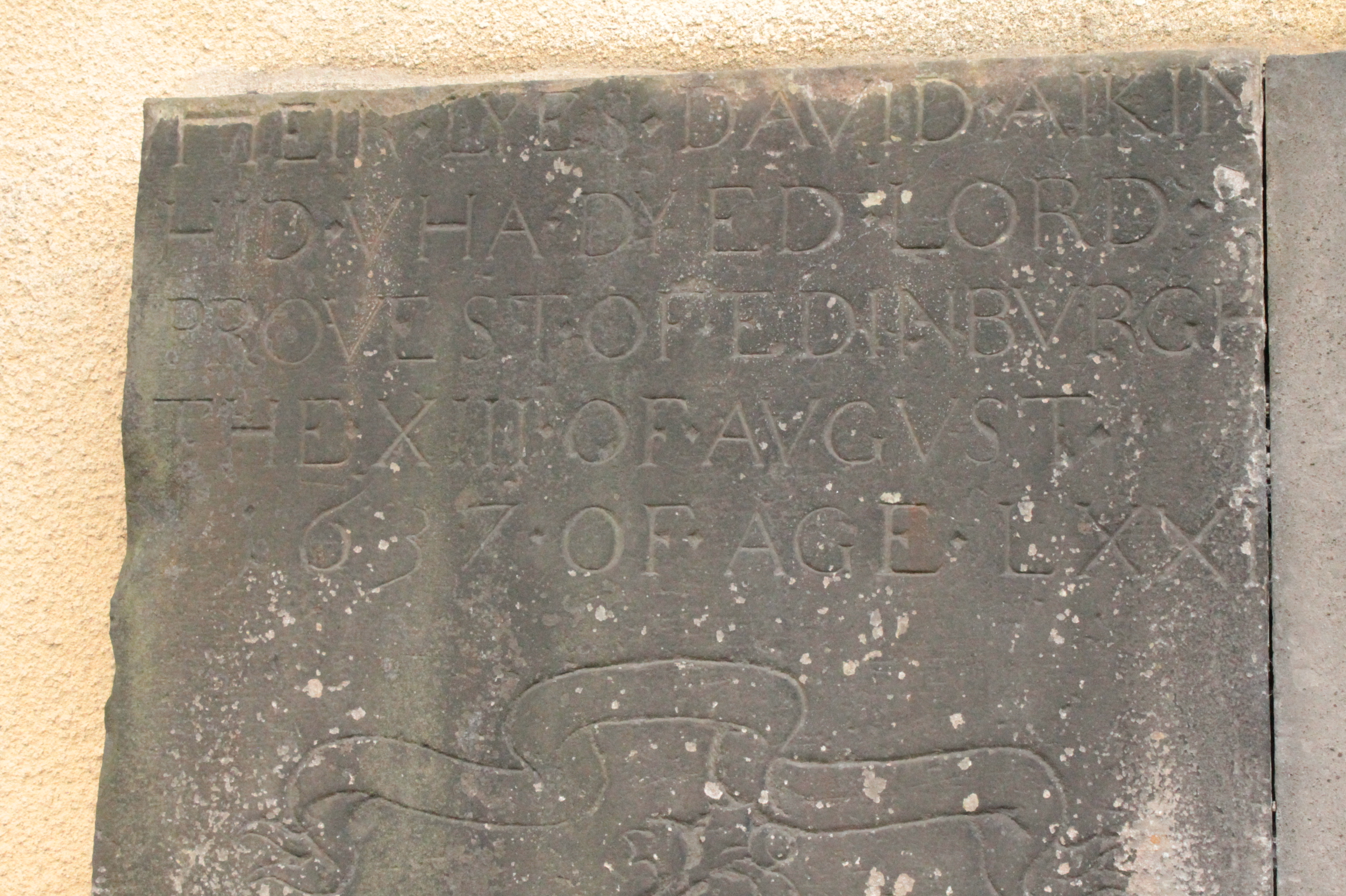
- The grave of David Aikenhead, Greyfriars Kirkyard
- Born: 1566; Edinburgh, Kingdom of Scotland
- Died: 1637 (aged 70–71); Edinburgh, Kingdom of Scotland
- Occupation: Lawyer
- Known for: Served twice as Lord Provost of Edinburgh

David Aikinhead or Aikenhead or Aikinhid (1566– 13 August 1637) was a 17th-century Scottish lawyer who twice served as Lord Provost of Edinburgh, from 1620 to 1622 and 1625 to 1630.

== Life ==
He was born in Edinburgh in 1566 the son of Helen Ramsey and her husband James Aikenhead, a town burgess. He was descended from the Aikenheads of Lanarkshire.

In 1620 he succeeded Alexander Clerk as Provost of Edinburgh. In 1622 Clerk (then known as Alexander Clerk of Stenton) regained office. Aikinhead was elected again in 1625 and then served for 5 years, being replaced by Clerk's son, Alexander Clerk of Pittencrieff. In his second term of office Aikenhead was responsible for major improvements and reorganisation of the University of Edinburgh.

He died in Edinburgh on 13 August 1637 aged 71. He was buried within the interior of Greyfriars Kirk but was removed (with others) to the exterior (the north-east outer face of the church) following the fire of 1845.

== Family ==
He was father of James Aikenhead, an advocate, and a Commissioner representing Edinburgh 1672/73.

Around 1650 his granddaughter Jane Aikenhead (daughter of his son Alexander Aikenhead WS) married Adam Nisbet, son of Sir Alexander Nisbet (nephew of provost William Nisbet of Dean) and his wife Katherine Hay. They were parents to the antiquarian Alexander Nisbet.

His younger brother (or cousin) Thomas Aikenhead was the last person in Scotland executed for blasphemy.

His sister Marion married Patrick Sands, Principal of the University of Edinburgh and "second charge of Greyfriars Kirk.
