= Alexander Leighton =

Scottish medical doctor, puritan preacher and pamphleteer

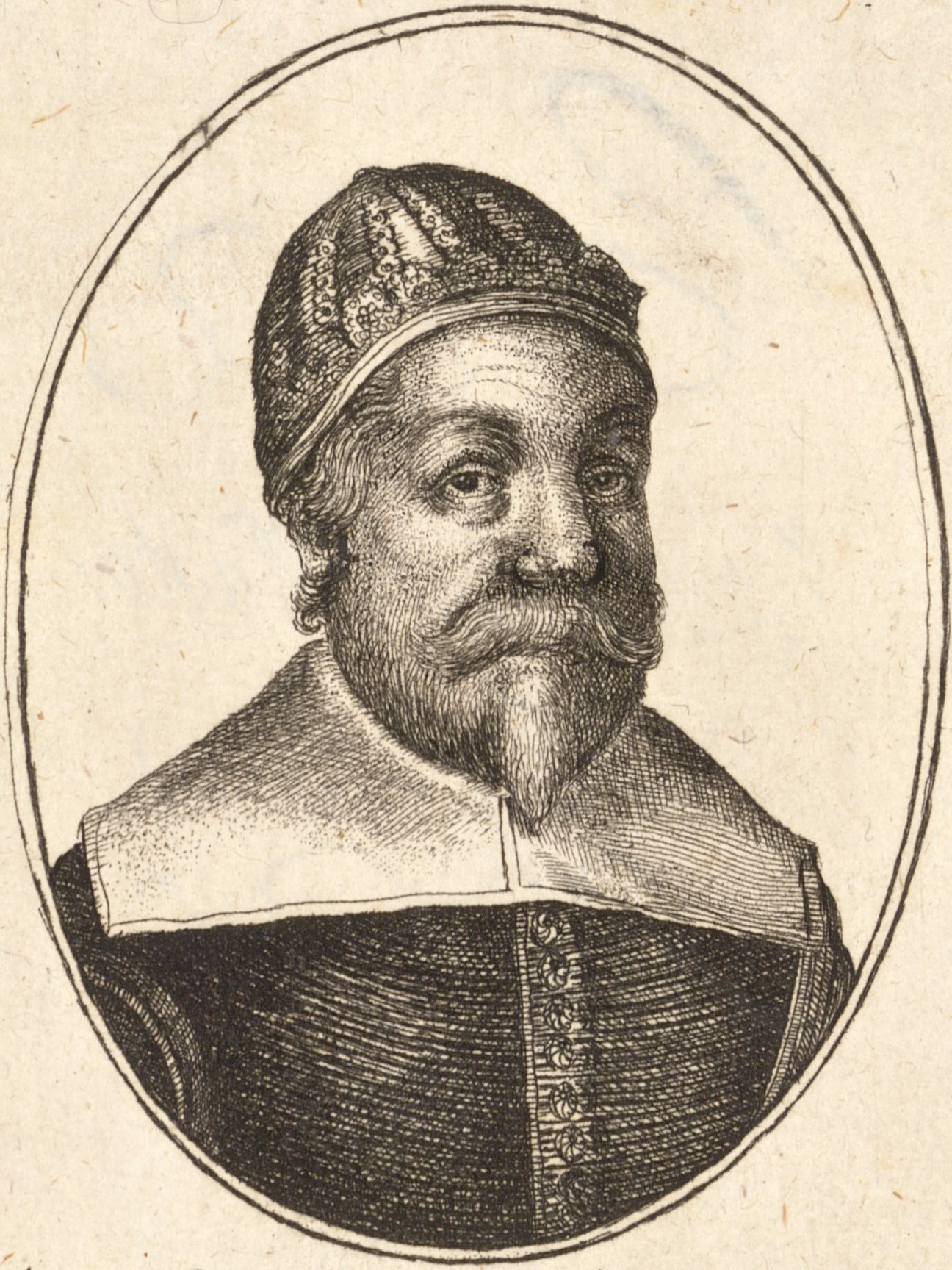
- Contemporary engraving of Alexander Leighton by Wenceslas Hollar
- Born: c. 1570; Scotland, possibly near Montrose
- Died: 1649; London
- Occupation(s): Physician, pamphleteer
- Spouse: Married twice
- Children: Robert Leighton, Sapphira, Elisha (later Sir Ellis Leighton)

Alexander Leighton (c. 1570 – 1649) was a Scottish medical doctor and puritan preacher and author, best known for his book Zion's Plea Against Prelacy, which attacked the Anglican church and led to his torture by King Charles I.

== Early life ==
Leighton was born in Scotland about 1570. The Dictionary of National Biography states that he was descended from an ancient family possessed of the estate of Ulysham (Ulishaven) near Montrose.

Although his father was a Roman Catholic, Leighton himself became a Presbyterian and a strong opponent of Catholicism.

== Medical career ==
Leighton studied at the University of St Andrews (MA, 1587) and Leiden University (MD), where he studied under Professor van Herne. He worked as a medical doctor, but records show that he was prohibited from practice in 1619 and again in 1626. It is unknown whether these judgements were influenced by his religious views, though they predated the publication in 1628 of the pamphlet for which he was tortured.

On 17 September 1619, Leighton was summoned to a censorial hearing, which took place on 24 September 1619. The charge was that he had caused the death of a patient, along with other crimes which were taken into account. He was found guilty and barred from further practice. The entry reads:

L[eighton], a Scot & a clergyman, had been at Leyden. He claimed to have read all of Galen, especially DE MEDENDI METHODO, but was ignorant on Book IX, phlebotomy, & on temperament. He confessed to practice on one Eglesfield's servant (charged by Pattison), but claimed it was cordial alkermes 7 j water & did not cause death. Blamed surgeon Chapman. Promised not to practise further. He also confessed to making up medicines, but denied taking certain fees (e.g. from Mr Mounson). Many other crimes were taken into account.

—

He was found guilty and prohibited from practice for a second time on 7 July 1626, when he "confessed to having practiced for 11 years". On 5 January 1627, he was arrested for debt. He wished to be licensed and was asked what he would pay as a fine for previous practice. He reluctantly agreed to pay twenty shillings. After this, he moved to Holland for a period between one and three years, during which he published his controversial manuscript.

== Religious controversy ==
Leighton published Zion's Plea Against Prelacy: An Appeal to Parliament in Holland, perhaps in 1629. (This is the year proposed in Pollard and Redgrave's Short-Title Catalogue, which rejects the book's own dating to the fall of La Rochelle: that is, October 1628.) In this book, Leighton criticised the church, and in particular the bishops who then ruled the Church of Scotland, condemning them as "antiChristian and satanic". He branded Queen Henrietta Maria herself as "the daughter of Heth" (a Canaanite and an idolatress), He was sentenced by Archbishop William Laud's High Commission Court to public whipping, to having the letters 'SS' branded on him (for 'Sower of Sedition'), and having one of his ears cut off and his nose slit. Medical records say that, "since he had been censured by the Star Chamber on religious grounds (& had had his ears cropped)", that he should now be 'infamis' in his profession, and he was permanently banned from further practice. John Taylor Brown, writing in Encyclopædia Britannica, expressed the opinion that Leighton's persecution and punishment "form one of the most disgraceful incidents of the reign of King Charles I".

Once the warrant for his arrest was issued by the High Commission Court, Leighton was taken to William Laud's house and then to Newgate Prison without any trial. He was put in irons in solitary confinement in an unheated and uncovered cell for fifteen weeks, in which the rain and snow could beat in upon him. None of his friends nor even his wife were permitted to see him during this time. According to four doctors, Leighton was so sick that he was unable to attend his supposed sentencing. Durant notes that Leighton also "was tied to a stake and received thirty-six stripes with a heavy cord upon his naked back; he was placed in the pillory for two hours in November's frost and snow; he was branded in the face, had his nose split and his ears cut off, and was condemned to life imprisonment". He was only released from jail when his son Robert was ordained as a Minister at Newbattle.

In the end, the Star Chamber's sentence was not carried out in full. The Long Parliament released him from prison in 1640, when they cancelled his fine, and paid him £6,000 for his suffering. In 1642, Leighton was appointed Keeper of Lambeth House, which had been converted into a prison.

== Death ==
His date of death, which probably took place in London, has been disputed. Although some sources name the date as 1644, evidence from his own son indicates he died between about June and September 1649.

== Family ==
Leighton was twice married. His first wife and mother of his six children was Scottish. His second wife was the daughter of Sir William Musgrave of Cumberland. Leighton had four sons – Robert, Elisha, James, and Caleb – and two daughters – Sapphira and Elizabeth. James and Caleb did not survive to maturity. His son Robert Leighton became Bishop of Dunblane, Archbishop of Glasgow and Principal of the University of Edinburgh. His son Elisha (later Sir Ellis Leighton) (died 1684) was secretary to John Berkeley, 1st Baron Berkeley of Stratton when he was Lord-Lieutenant of Ireland in 1670 and British Ambassador to France in 1675. Elisha died on 9 January 1684 and his will mentions a daughter Mary. Leighton's daughter Sapphira (sometimes known as Susan) (1623–1704) married Edward Lightmaker of Broadhurst Manor, Haywards Heath, Sussex. Leighton's other daughter Elizabeth married a Mr. Rothband.

== See also ==
- Robert Leighton, Alexander's son
