= History of Dunfermline =

Dunfermline (Scottish Gaelic: Dùn Phàrlain) is a former burgh and current city in Fife, Scotland. The town grew under the influence of Queen Margaret to be an important ecclesiastical burgh (a town with special privileges). On 20 May 2022 it was granted city status.

== Early history ==
Pictish and Gaelic names in the Dunfermline area are multiple. For example, the "bal" (a dwelling) found in Balmule and Balclune; the prefix "caer" (a castle) found in Carnock (caer-knock), Cairneyhill and Keirsbeath and Pittencrieff and Pitreavie from "pit". Dunfermline is derived from "Dun" (fortified hill), "fiaram" (bent or crooked) and "lin" (a cascade or pool). A reference of the city's name is found in the tower hill around which the rivulet crooks and drops over a 15-foot cascade of the Ferm burn.

One of the earliest records of the city was known for being used as a centre of the Culdees in 570 AD, based on a site near or on the grounds of the present Abbey. Written history of Dunfermline begins with King Malcolm III in the mid-11th century who would play a pivotal role transferring power from Forteviot in Perthshire to Dunfermline becoming the seat of power and capital of Scotland.

King Malcolm III accepted marriage to Queen Margaret in 1069 as his second wife after she met him in his royal residence which would become the site of Dunfermline Palace. According to St Dunleum, there is a belief that they may have met previously. Margaret's Benedictine education – for which she brought as and became a devout catholic – encouraged him to convert the small Culdee church into a Benedictine priory to bring her faith to Scotland to replace the basic needs of the Culdees. The new church was inaugurated around 1072 with Lanfranc, then-Archbishop of Canterbury sending Benedictine monks on the insistence of Margaret who not only dedicated the priory to the holy trinity. Another dedication to the priory was also made to the "crucifix of the holy saviour" made of ebony, gold and silver and covered in gems from her own homeland. King Malcolm III was killed at the battle of Alnwick, Queen Margaret died in Edinburgh Castle on 10 November 1093. The body of the Queen was taken to Dunfermline for her burial on a site near the Rwde Awtre (the Altar of the Holy Cross or Rood) via the Queen's Ferry but this was journey was made with great difficulty particularly when the castle was under siege by Donald Bane with the only exit in the form of a secret door in the abbey church.

== Creation and influence of Dunfermline Abbey ==
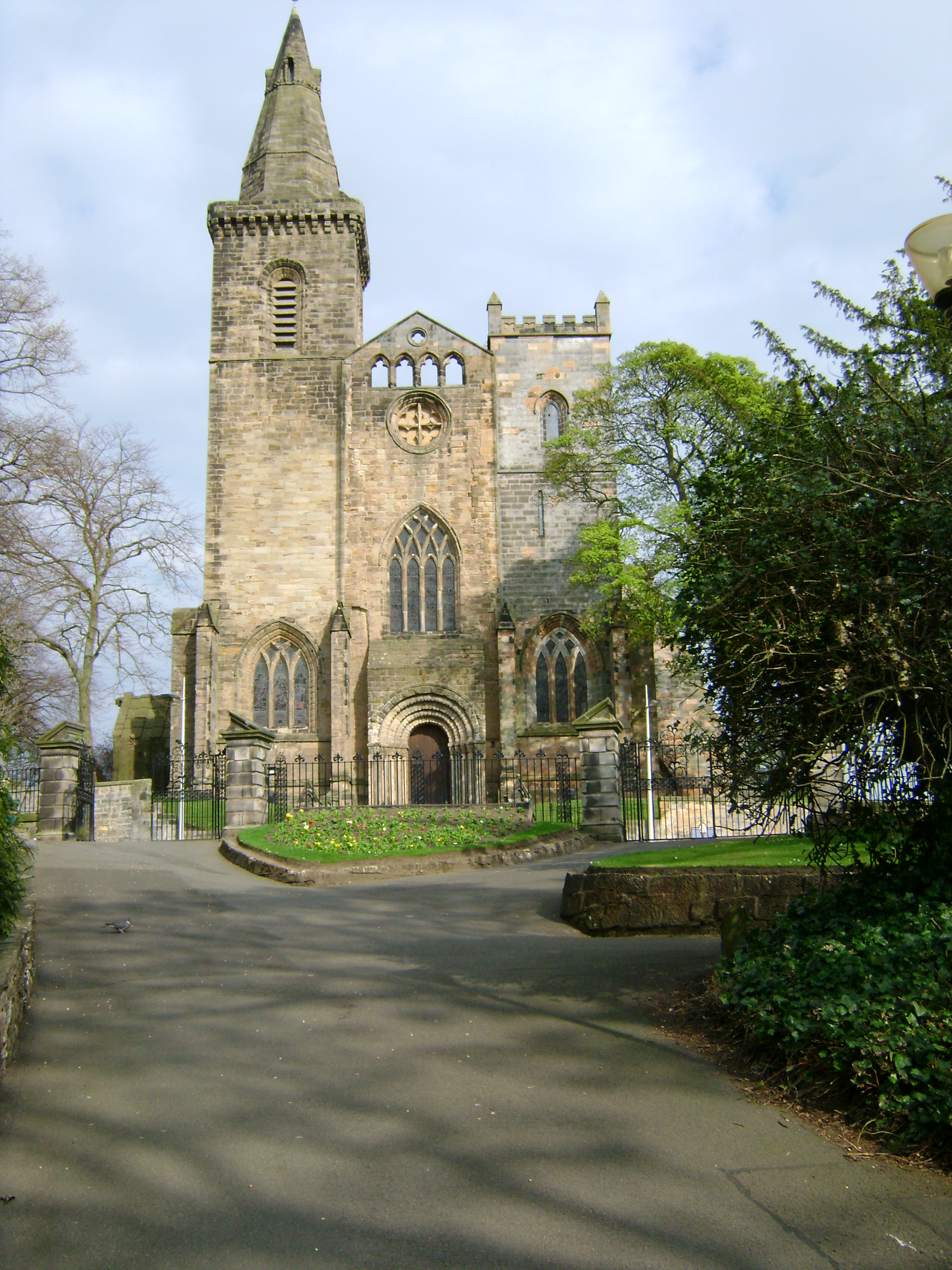
Dunfermline Abbey

The Benedictine priory was raised to the rank of an abbey in 1128 by David II, with Prior Geoffrey in place as the first abbot. During the course of several decades, the abbey gained power and wealth in Dunfermline with the dedication of 26 altars being gifted by the individuals and guilds and the bishop of Dunfermline controlled a large piece of land from Moray to Berwickshire close to the English border which included four burghs and three courts of regality. The abbey was also given permission to dig the lands of Pittencrieff in 1291 for the extraction of coal for personal usage on a lease – the oldest record of not only coal mining but also Fife industry benefiting many people who would eventually depend on this livelihood as their source of work in West Fife. There were five individual developments to the abbey all occurring between 1128 and 1450 with the construction of a nave around 1140; the expansion of the choir of the mastried church complete with a shrine in 1240 which was followed by major restoration work of the receptory partially assisted by Robert the Bruce – who died shortly after and was buried in the graveyard – in 1329 and then later with a new West Gave by Bishop Richard de Bothwell in 1450. Further work centered on the north-west tower of the nave between 1594 and 1599 by William Shaw.

The abbey though did have some rough patches with the force of the troops of Edward I causing substantial damage in 1303 which he claimed beforehand: "not a church, but a den of thieves.....a thorn in the eye of the English throne" with another contribution by the reformation lords in 1560 causing the demolition of some parts – including the removal of shrine of St Margaret which has been labelled as maybe their worst act – deteriorating the state of the abbey further.

== History of the town's name and Royal Burgh status ==
The town's name was first recorded as "Dunfermelitane" in the confirmation charters by David I in 1128. The name of "Dunfermline" was not officially adopted until 1609 but references had been made in the seals and badges of the royal coat of arms. Dunfermline was credited as a "menus burgh" by David II with evidence suggesting that burgh of barony status took place between 1124 and 1147. Royal burgh status was later granted by James VI of Scotland in 1588.

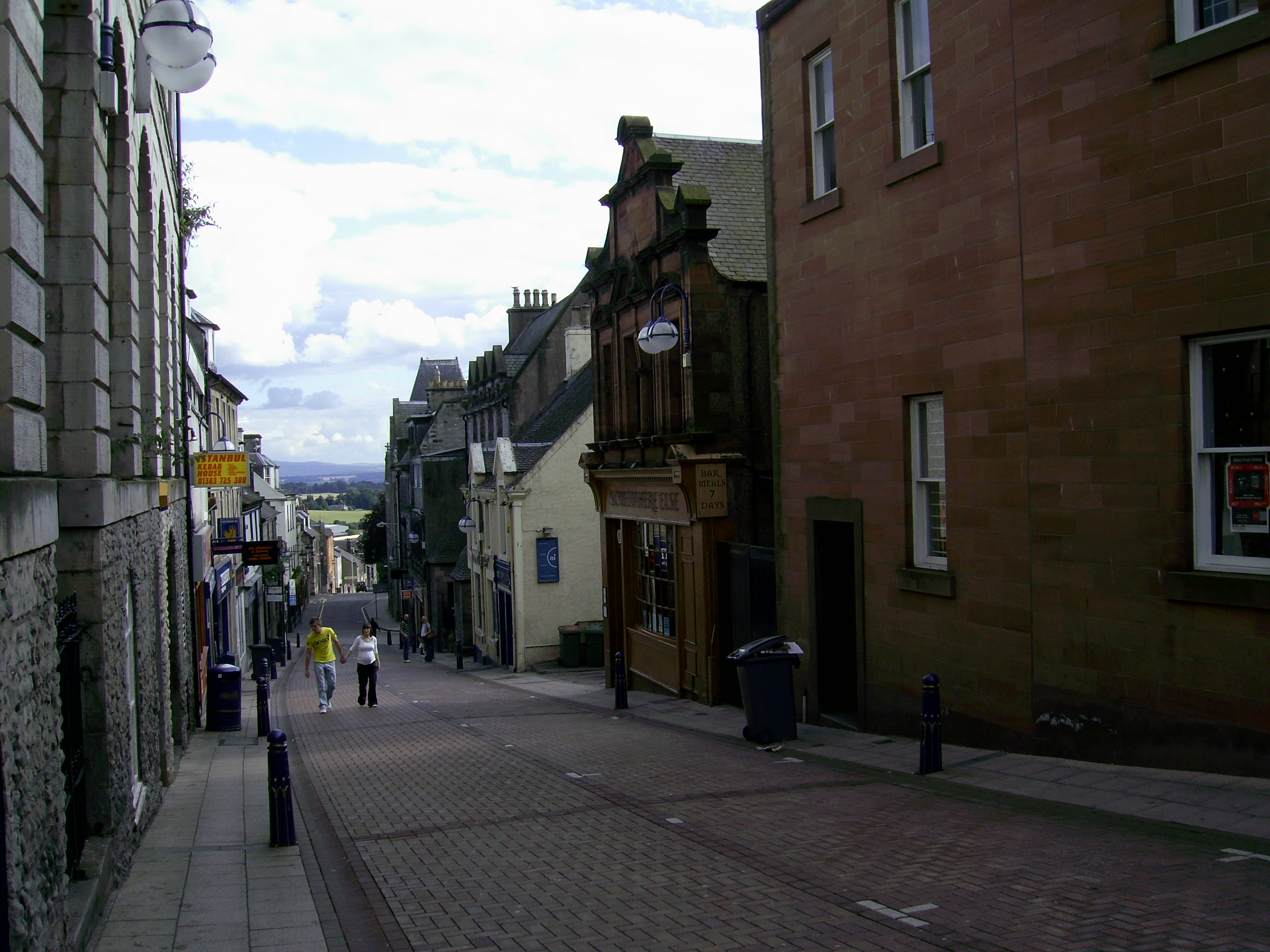
Crosswynd, which was once one of the six gates in Dunfermline

The construction of six gates in Dunfermline in 1396 were to maintain the burgher's rights; the need for tolls and to a lesser extent to defend. These gates were: The Mill or Collieraw Port (East of Bruce Street); Rottenraw port (near the top of South Chapel Street); Crosswynd Port (now Crosswynd) East Port; Tolbooth Port (bottom of Bruce Street) and West Port (middle of St Catherines Wynd).

Dunfermline would remain as the capital of Scotland until the brutal murder of James I at Perth in 1437. The royal family felt safer in Edinburgh Castle, as burghs such as Dunfermline and Stirling could not provide protection in defense of the nobles.

== Decline of royal status and birth of the linen industry ==
The relocation of the Scottish courts to London being the result of the union of the crowns drawn up in 1603 saw the loss of the city's royal connections. A subsequent fire in 1624, saw a large part of the city in ruin, before being deprived of the ecclesiastical centre along with St Andrews by the Reformation. Dunfermline quickly sank into decline.

In the 18th century, the city impressed Daniel Defoe as showing the "full perfection of decay". The town would soon regain prosperity with the introduction of the weaving of linen damask – which would eventually become recognised as the world's leading producer – established by James Blake in 1718 after being inspired by having gained the experience of the special technique of one in Edinburgh as the way to take Dunfermline forward. Dunfermline became one of four main centres of the industry alongside Kirkcaldy, Dysart and Leslie in 1810. Although the first power looms in operation brought greater demand for the town's linen industry by 1825 as Dunfermline began to acknowledge the coming of the industrial revolution. The underlying success of the linen in Dunfermline was prompted by a report by the Ordnance Gazette in 1894 who said: "The damask manufacture of Dunfermline is probably unequalled in the world for design and beauty of finish". Among other industries that have largely contributed to the welfare of the town are dyeing, bleaching; soap (from the 1790s); rope-making (from the 1830s); iron founding; textile milling; distillery and brewing.
