= Elisha Leighton =

Scottish courtier and government official

Sir Elisha Leighton (died 1685) was a Scottish courtier and government official.

== Life ==
He was the younger son of Alexander Leighton; Robert Leighton was his elder brother. During the Wars of the Three Kingdoms he rose to be a colonel in the royalist army, was arrested in August 1647 at Kingston-on-Thames, and was imprisoned in Windsor Castle. After the execution of Charles I he joined the royalist party abroad.

George Villiers, 2nd Duke of Buckingham took Leighton into his service. In the autumn of 1649 Charles IV, Duke of Lorraine sent him to England, to enlist soldiers for the royal cause. He was closely examined in November of that year by the Council of State and warned that he was likely to be proceeded against as a spy.

In December 1650 Charles II appointed Leighton secretary for English affairs in Scotland. After the battle of Worcester he escaped to Rotterdam with Buckingham, in October 1651. Fighting a duel with Major Nicholas Armorer in Brabant, he was sent in June 1652 by Buckingham to London with a sealed letter directed to Oliver Cromwell. The Council of State refused to listen to him, gave him back the letter, and ordered him to leave the country within a certain time; but he is also reported to have had a courteous extended interview with Cromwell.

After Leighton's return to Antwerp he had a serious illness, became temporarily insane, and on his recovery turned to Roman Catholicism. In June 1656 he deserted Buckingham, on the pretext that the duke did not "rightly submit to the king". He subsequently became secretary to the Duke of York, and was knighted at Brussels in April 1659.

At the Restoration of 1660, Leighton made his peace with Buckingham, and was indebted to him for preferment. He persuaded Lord Aubigny to recommend his elder brother, Robert for a bishopric in 1661. On 28 April 1664, he was made one of the secretaries of the prize office. Charles also recommended him to the University of Cambridge for the degree of LL.D. on 19 May 1665. He was appointed one of the king's counsel in the admiralty court on 15 June of that year and was admitted a civilian on 3 April 1666.

Leighton was a signatory to The Several Declarations of The Company of Royal Adventurers of England Trading into Africa, a document published in 1667 which led to the expansion of the Royal Africa Company. Leighton continued his involvement with Royal Africa Company affairs, eventually becoming the secretary of the corporation through the influence of the Duke of York, who would become the future King James II.

Leighton made an indifferent advocate, according to Samuel Pepys. When John Berkeley went to Ireland in 1670 as lord-lieutenant, he chose Leighton for his secretary. Leighton contrived to turn out of the Dublin corporation the recorder and several of the principal aldermen who were known to be opposed to Catholics. He then contrived his own appointment as Recorder of Dublin, and received a present of money from the citizens. In 1675 he accompanied Berkeley on his embassy to France, and, while arranging for the restitution of vessels captured by French privateers, took bribes on all sides. A warrant was issued for his arrest, but he managed to evade it.

Leighton died in the parish of St Andrew, Holborn, on 9 January 1685, and was buried in the church of Horsted Keynes, Sussex, leaving a daughter Mary. He had a turn for mechanics, and became a Fellow of the Royal Society on 9 December 1663, but was expelled in 1677. John Evelyn went to see his project of "a cart with iron axle-trees" in September 1668. He apparently euphonised Elisha into "Ellis".

== Works ==
A Speech at the Tholsell of Dublin was printed in 1672.

== Notes ==
Attribution

This article incorporates text from a publication now in the public domain: Lee, Sidney, ed. (1893). "Leighton, Elisha". Dictionary of National Biography. Vol. 33. London: Smith, Elder & Co.
