= Andrew Ramsay (minister) =

Andrew Ramsay (1574–1659) was a minister of the Church of Scotland, academic at the University of Edinburgh, and writer of Latin poetry.

== Life ==
He was born in Balmain House near Fettercairn in 1574 the son of Sir David Ramsay and his wife, Catherine Carnegie, daughter of Sir Robert Carnegie of Kinnaird. He gained a degree (MA) at Marischal College in Aberdeen then studied Theology in France at the University of Saumur and became a Professor there around 1595.

He returned to Scotland in 1606 following the Union of Crowns to take up a position as minister of the Church of Scotland in Arbuthnott Parish Church. In 1613 he was examined by the Archbishop of St Andrews to assess his suitability for a senior post in Edinburgh to replace Peter Hewat. In April 1614 he was appointed minister of the south-west parish of St Giles (the forerunner to Greyfriars Parish). In 1615 and 1619 he represented his parish in the Court of the High Commission. In 1617 he was co-signator to the Protestation for the Liberties of the Kirk. This function ceased on the creation of Greyfriars Kirk in 1620.

He declined the Principalship of Marischal College in 1620. From 1620 to 1625 he was Professor of Divinity at the University of Edinburgh. In 1625 when St Giles was split into four parishes but this resulted in his becoming minister of the newly completed Greyfriars Kirk.

Ramsay twice served as Rector of the University of Edinburgh, 1620–26 and 1646–48. In 1620, the university separated the posts of principal and rector: the advocate Patrick Sands was appointed the university's first non-theologian Principal, and Ramsay was appointed Professor of Divinity and Rector. He resigned in March 1626. Reappointed as Rector in 1646, he was deposed for his refusal to preach against the Engagers, the Covenanters who had agreed a secret treaty with Charles I.

In 1641 he translated from Greyfriars Kirk to Old Kirk parish in St Giles. After the Battle of Kilsyth he avoided capture and was taken into the protection of the Marquess of Montrose. He was deposed as a minister in 1648 for his support of the Duke of Hamilton's "Engagement" with King Charles I.

He retired to Abbotshall in Fife and died there on 30 December 1659.

== Family ==
In 1605 he married Marie Fraser, daughter of Sir Alexander Fraser of Durris. Their children included:

- Rev Robert Ramsay of Woodston, minister of Ecclesgreig
- Andrew Ramsay, Lord Abbotshall, judge and Lord Provost of Edinburgh.
- Eleazer (b.1614)
- David (1625-1660)
- William Ramsay, a preacher in Calderwood and ecclesiastical historian

== Publications ==
- Oratio (1600)
- Parcenesin et Orationes de Laudibus Academics Salmuriensis
- Sacred Poems and Miscellany (1633)
- A Warning to Come Out of Babel (1638)
- A Treatise (1646)
