= Alexander Clerk of Pittencrieff =

Scottish merchant

Sir Alexander Clerk of Pittencrieff (1600 – c. 1660) was a 17th-century Scottish merchant who twice served as Provost of Edinburgh.

== Life ==
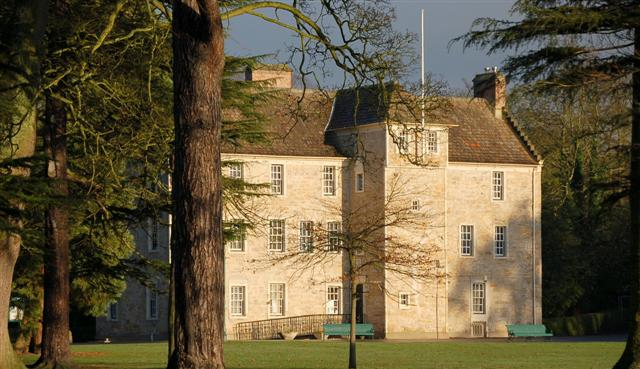
Pittencrieff House in Dunfermline

He was born in Edinburgh on 23 September 1600 the eldest son of Alexander Clerk of Stenton in East Lothian and his wife, Marion Primrose. His father was a merchant who bought Pittencrieff House in 1610 and served as Provost of Edinburgh from 1623 to 1625.

Alexander (the younger) was twice Provost of Edinburgh (he pre-dated the use of the term Lord Provost). In 1630 he succeeded David Aikinhead serving until 1634. In 1633 he was knighted by King Charles I during his visit to the city, the ceremony taking place at the Cross of St John on the Canongate.

He served a second term 1640 to 1643. In 1641 he met King Charles II in his role as provost. Although not an "old man" (some sources confuse him with his father) he was probably a diplomatic choice. He was Provost at the outbreak of the English Civil War which was an extremely troubled period.

From 1631 to 1635 he undertook a major extension project at Pittencrieff House, extending it upwards.

Alexander was still in Pittencrieff House in 1657. In 1685 the house was owned by George Murray.

Alexander is thought to have died around 1660. He is presumed to be buried in the graveyard attaching Dunfermline Abbey, which is very close to his house.

== Pittencrieff House ==
In 1903 Andrew Carnegie bought Pittencrieff House and its huge grounds and gifted it to his home town of Dunfermline as the public park Pittencrieff Park.
