= Robert Leighton (bishop) =

17th-century scholar and preacher

The Most Reverend Robert Leighton
- Archbishop of Glasgow
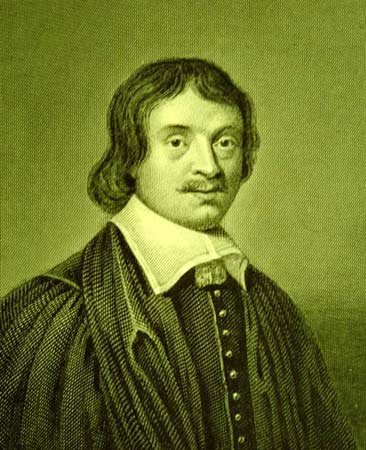
- A. W. Warren's 1825 depiction of the archbishop.
- Church: Church of Scotland
- Archdiocese: Glasgow
- In office: 1671–1674
- Predecessor: Alexander Burnet
- Successor: Alexander Burnet

Orders
- Consecration: 15 December 1661 by Gilbert Sheldon

Personal details
- Born: 1611 London, England
- Died: 25 June 1684 London, England
- Parents: Alexander Leighton
- Occupation: Bishop; Archbishop

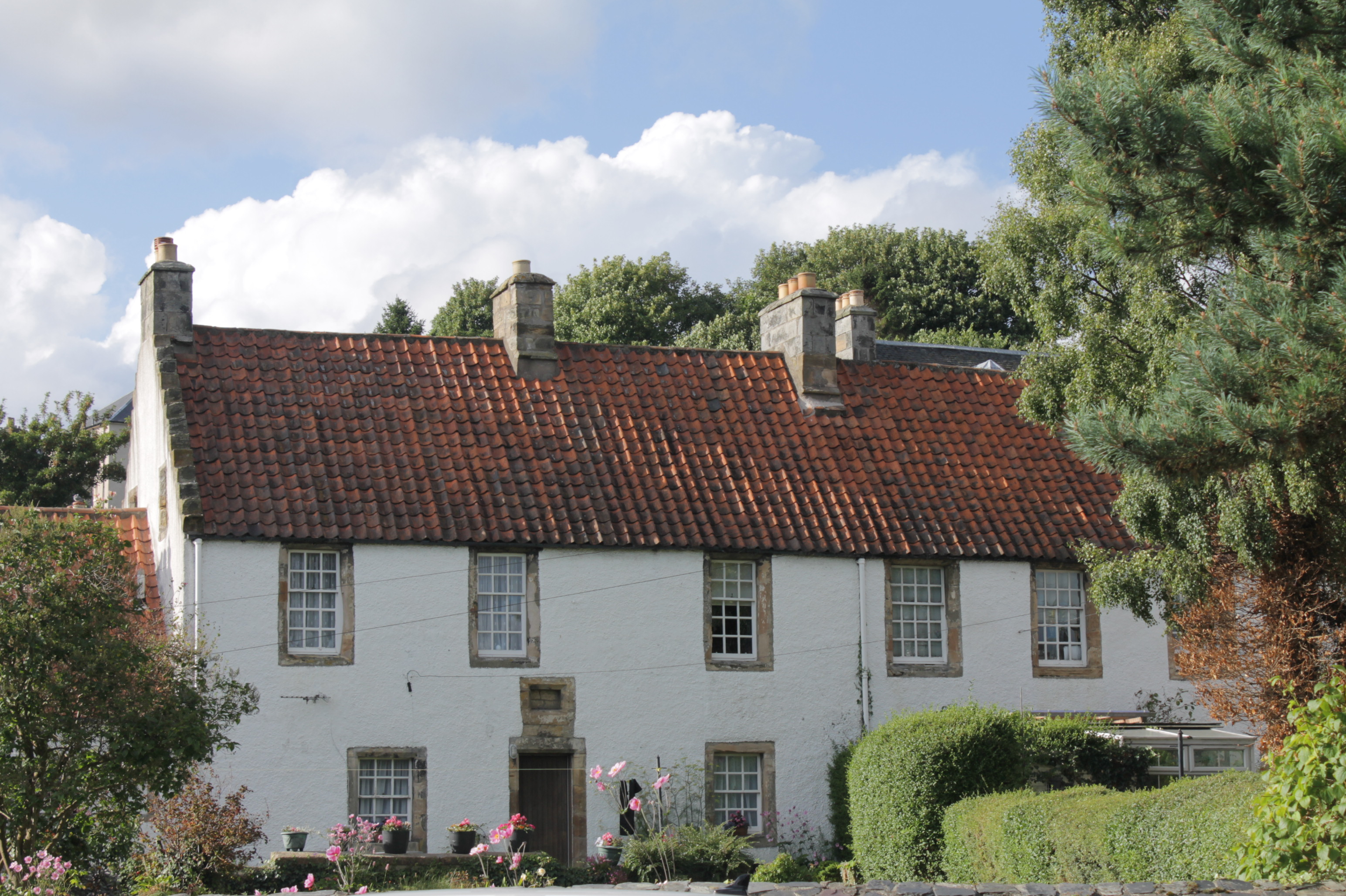
Bishop Leighton's house, Culross, garden (east) frontage

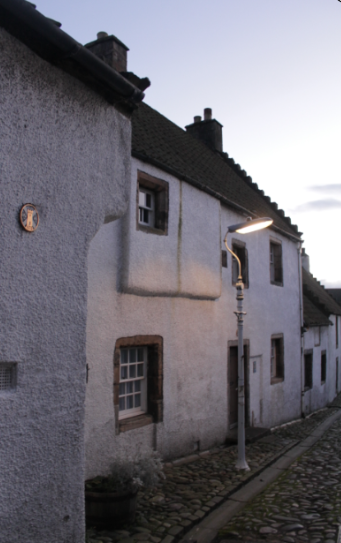
Bishop Leighton's house, Culross west front

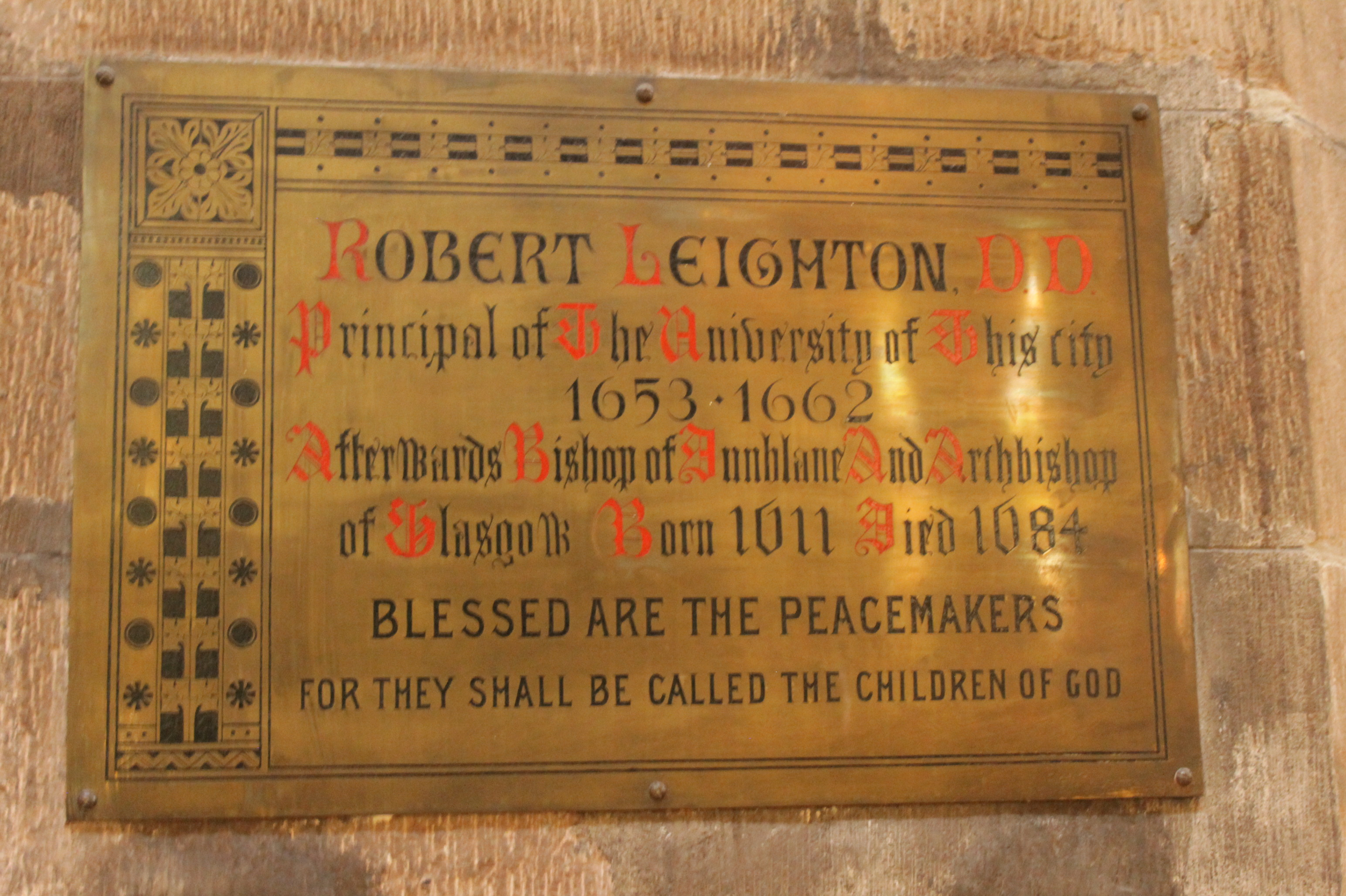
Plaque to Robert Leighton, St Giles Cathedral

Robert Leighton (1611 – 25 June 1684) was a Scottish prelate and scholar, best known as a church minister, Bishop of Dunblane, Archbishop of Glasgow, and Principal of the University of Edinburgh from 1653 to 1662. He was "noted for his Christian piety, his humility and gentleness, and his devotion to his calling".

== Early life ==
Leighton lived through one of the most turbulent periods in Scottish history. His grandfather was a Pre-Reformation Catholic; his father, Doctor Alexander Leighton, was tortured during the reign of King Charles I for his Presbyterian beliefs after authoring a pamphlet, Zion's Plea against Prelacy, in which he criticised the church, condemning bishops as "anti-christian and satanic". Robert became an archbishop during one of the periods when the Church of Scotland was episcopal.

Robert Leighton was born in London to Scottish parents in 1611. Robert Leighton's mother was Alexander Leighton's first wife. According to Gilbert Burnet, Leighton was distinguished for his "saintly disposition" from his earliest childhood, despite the persecution of his family. In 1627 (before his father published his pamphlet) at the age of sixteen, Robert Leighton went to study at the University of Edinburgh, graduating with an MA in 1631.

Following his graduation, his father sent him to travel abroad, and he is understood to have spent several years in France, where he acquired a complete mastery of the French language. While there he passed a good deal of time with relatives at Douai who had become Roman Catholics, and with whom he kept up a correspondence for many years afterward. Either at this time or on some subsequent visit he had also a good deal of intercourse with members of the Jansenist party. This intercourse contributed to the charity towards those who differed from him in religious opinion which ever afterward formed a feature in his character.

== Church career ==
Having returned to Scotland, at the age of thirty, Leighton was ordained as a Minister in the Church of Scotland on 16 December 1641. The ordination took place at Newbattle in Midlothian and thirty-year-old Leighton was installed as Parish Minister of Newbattle on the same date. Following the furore over his father's actions, it took a while before Leighton was accepted as Minister. Parish records show that he had to deliver five trial sermons – two of which had to be delivered on the same day – before being accepted:

On the 16th of December, decreed as a whilk day for the appointment of Mr Robert Lichtoune, a sermon was delivered by John Knox, based on Hebrews 13 Verse 17. After his sermon, Mr John Knox put to Robert Lichtoune and the parishioners, sundry questions competent to ye occasion and after the imposition of hands and ye solemne prayer, was admitted minister of Newbattle (Session Records)

Leighton signed the Solemn League and Covenant in 1643. Leighton served at Newbattle for eleven years, before resigning his charge in 1652. What led him to take this step is not immediately clear, though the account given is that he had little sympathy with the fiery zeal of his brother clergymen on certain political questions, and that this led to severe censures on their part.

== University of Edinburgh ==
Early in 1653, Leighton was appointed principal of the University of Edinburgh, and primarius professor of divinity. The position was originally supposed to be filled by William Colvill, but Colvill was unable to take possession of it, since he was in the Netherlands and so the position was declared vacant again, and Leighton appointed in Colvill's place. Leighton continued in this post until 1662, when he was succeeded by Colvill, who had since returned to Scotland.

A considerable number of his Latin prelections and other addresses (published after his death) focused on instructions on living a holy life. While at the university and afterwards he wrote commentaries on New Testament books and his theological and expository lectures were also published, notably An Exposition of the Creed, Lord's prayer and Ten Commandments, Rules and Instructions for a Holy Life and A Modest Defence of Moderate Episcopacy.

== Bishop and Archbishop ==
Although an ordained Presbyterian minister, in 1661 Leighton allowed himself to be appointed Bishop by King Charles II. Aware that he might be accused of seeking self-aggrandisement, he requested the post in Dunblane, the smallest and poorest see in the country. He sought to reconcile Presbyterians and Episcopalians in a United Church of Scotland, but his mild-mannered nature gave him problems in this role, Bishop Leighton suggested a system of ecclesiastical government in which the bishops were guided by the majority view of their presbyters but this found no favour with the other bishops. He attempted to resign in 1665, making a trip to London for that purpose, but did not go through with this after King Charles II agreed to milder measures. He repeated his trip to London again in 1669, but little result followed.

In 1670, he hesitantly agreed to accept appointment as Archbishop of Glasgow. In this higher sphere he redoubled his efforts with the Presbyterians to bring about some degree of conciliation with Episcopacy, but the only result was to embroil himself with the hot-headed Episcopal party as well as with the Presbyterians.

He resigned the archbishopric in 1674.

== Religious views ==
Leighton saw good and bad in both the Episcopal and the English Puritan forms of worship. The Puritan Party gained such popularity that Leighton retired from the Ministry at Newbattle, citing the introduction of the Cromwellian ideas as to doctrine and ritual, as his main reason. Scotland's "Apostle of Peace", as he became known, took up the post at Edinburgh University as principal for a period of 8 years, before being summoned to London, by Charles II, to be one of four bishops appointed to look after the King's Northern realm in the Westminster Way, hence his term at Dunblane as bishop and subsequently at Glasgow as archbishop.

== Later life ==
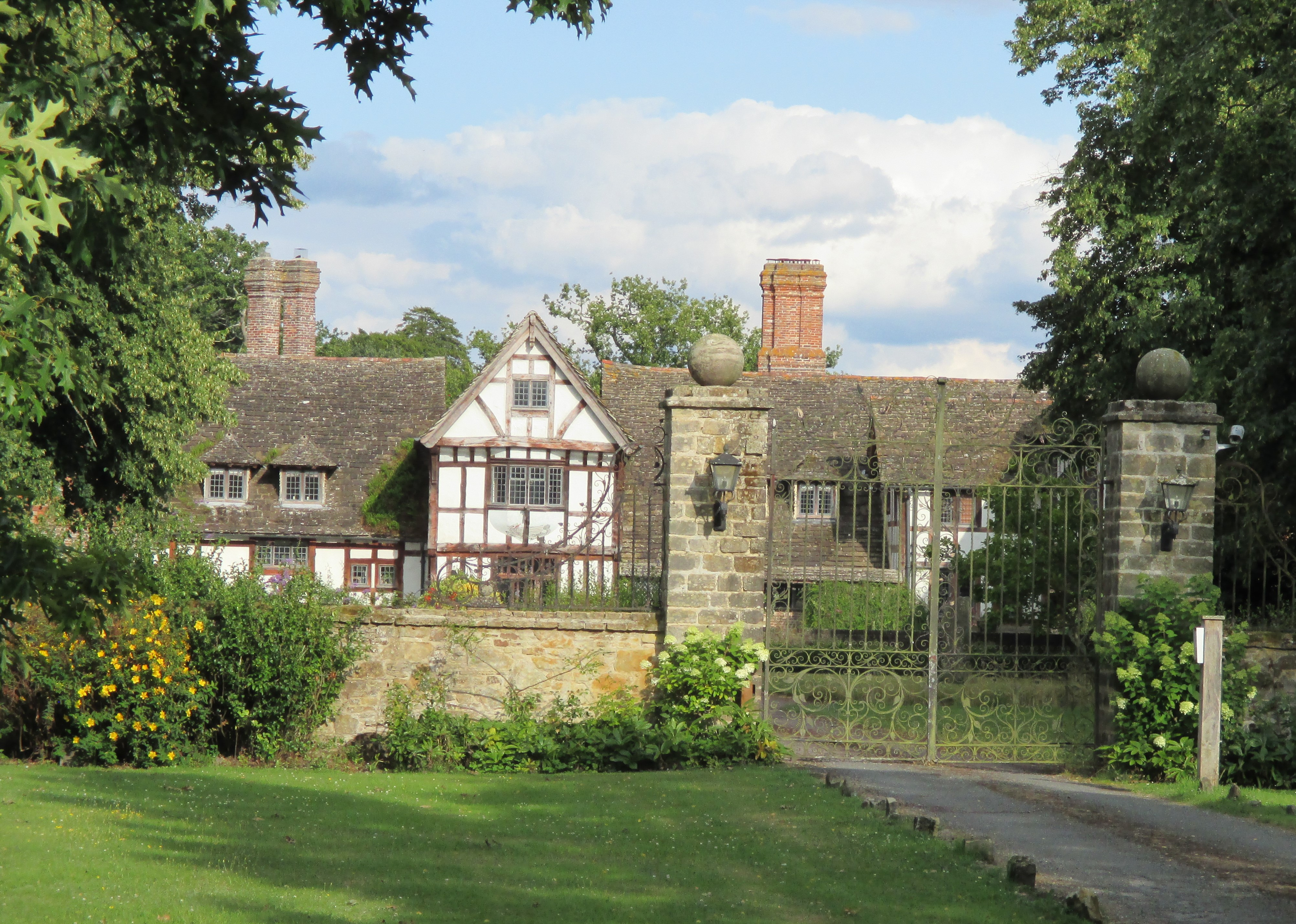
Broadhurst Manor, Leighton's final home

After leaving his position as archbishop in 1674, Leighton retired to the mansion of his widowed sister Sapphira (Mrs Edward Lightmaker), and her son, at Broadhurst near Horsted Keynes in Sussex.

Leighton died suddenly on 25 June 1684 during a trip to London, in an inn in the shadow of a partly finished St Paul's Cathedral. His final parting wish was that "At eventide there might be light".

Leighton was buried in Horsted Keynes. In his will, he bequeathed his collection of 1,400 volumes and a hundred pounds for the erection of the Leighton Library. He also gave instruction that all his personal papers and manuscripts be destroyed, though this never took place.

Following his death, a commentary of his on 1 Peter, was published in two volumes in 1693 and 1694, and has rarely been out of print ever since.

== Family ==
Leighton never married, and had no children.

Father: Alexander Leighton
Mother: Unknown (Alexander's first wife)

Brother: Elisha Leighton (???–1684) (later Sir Ellis Leighton) who was secretary to John Berkeley, 1st Baron Berkeley of Stratton when he was Lord-Lieutenant of Ireland in 1670 and British Ambassador to France in 1675.
Sister: Sapphira (later Mrs Edward Lightmaker) (1623–1704)
Other siblings who did not survive to maturity: James, Caleb, Elizabeth. However it is possible that Elizabeth did survive to maturity, as Leighton mentioned his mother and sisters (as opposed to sister) in some correspondence to his brother-in-law, Mr Edward Lightmaker (year unknown):

My mother writes to me and presses my coming up. I know not yet if that can be. But I intend, God willing, so soon as I can conveniently ... Remember my love to my sisters. The Lord be with you, and lead you in his ways.

His brother, Adam Lighton or Leighton, was minister of Currie parish church, south of Edinburgh, and was succeeded in this role by his son (Robert's nephew) Matthew Leighton.

== Leighton Library ==
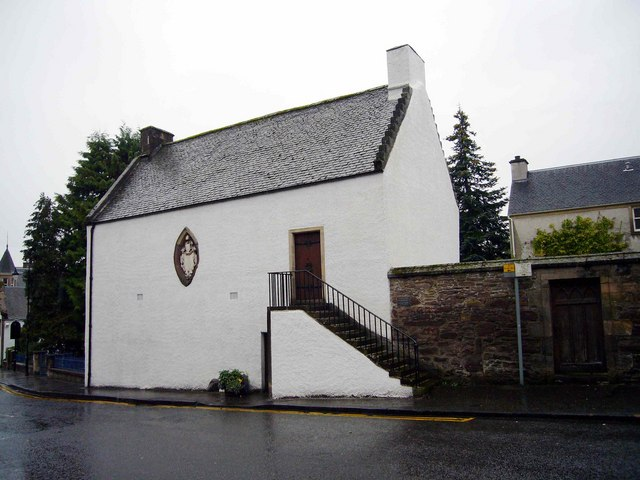
The Leighton Library, Dunblane

Leighton was a learned scholar, with wide-ranging interests. His legacy remains today in the Leighton Library (or Bibliotheca Leightoniana), which is the oldest purpose-built library in Scotland. It contains a collection of around 4,000 volumes and 78 manuscripts from the 16th to the 19th century, and is founded on the personal collection of Leighton, who bequeathed some 1,500 books to Dunblane Cathedral. A library building was erected between 1684 and 1688 in order to house the books for the use of the local clergy. From 1734 the library became one of the first subscription libraries in Scotland. The collection covers a variety of subject areas, including history and politics (particularly 17th century), theology, medicine, travel, and language.

Some of the collection was originally owned by Newbattle and was stored at the Old Manse, but it is now held in its entirety at The Cross, Dunblane. The catalogue of contents is now available to academics and researchers through arrangement with Stirling University.

Church of Scotland titles
Preceded by James Wedderburn	Bishop of Dunblane; 1661–1671	Succeeded by James Ramsay
Preceded by Alexander Burnet	Archbishop of Glasgow; 1671–1674	Succeeded by Arthur Rose
Academic offices
Preceded by John Adamson	Principals of the University of Edinburgh; 1653–1662	Succeeded by William Colvill
Preceded by Alexander Burnet	Chancellor of the University of Glasgow; 1671–1674	Succeeded by Alexander Burnet
