= Pittencrieff Park =

Public park in Dunfermline, Fife, Scotland

- The Glen
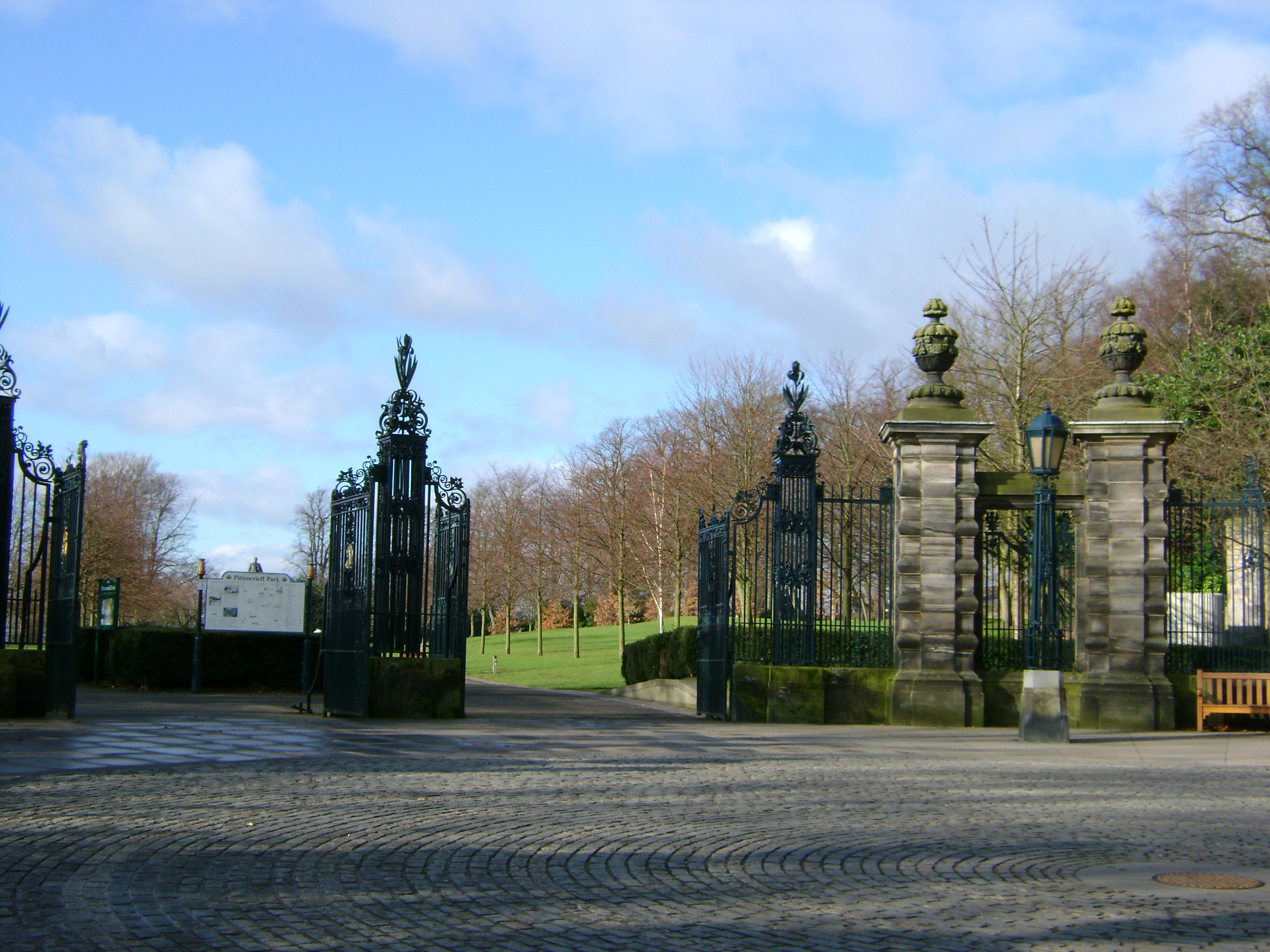
- Louise Carnegie Gates (the main entrance to Pittencrieff Park)
- Interactive map of Pittencrieff Park
- Type: Parkland, woodland, gardens
- Location: Dunfermline, Fife, Scotland
- Coordinates: 56.0681°N 3.4664°W
- Area: 76 acres (31 ha)
- Created: 1903
- Founder: Andrew Carnegie
- Operator: Fife Council
- Visitors: 750,000
- Status: Open all year
- Awards: Best Park in Scotland

Inventory of Gardens and Designed Landscapes in Scotland
- Official name: Pittencrieff Park
- Designated: 30 June 1987
- Reference no.: GDL00315

Pittencrieff Park (known locally as "The Glen") is a public park in Dunfermline, Fife, Scotland. It was purchased in 1902 by Andrew Carnegie, and given to the people of Dunfermline in a ceremony the following year. Its lands include the historically significant and topologically rugged glen which interrupts the centre of Dunfermline and, accordingly, part of the intention of the purchase was to carry out civic development of the area in a way which also respected its heritage. The project notably attracted the attention of the urban planner and educationalist, Patrick Geddes.

The glen is an area of topographical and historical significance to Dunfermline as the original site of Malcolm's Tower, the probable remains of which can be identified today on a strongly defendable outcrop of rock. To the eastern side of the park is Dunfermline Palace with Dunfermline Abbey and to the west it overlooks the village of Crossford.

== History ==
The lands of the modern park were previously known as Pittencrieff Estate. In 1902, Andrew Carnegie purchased both Pittencrieff House and Estate from its then-owner, Colonel James Maitland Hunt, ultimately with the intention of giving these to the people of Dunfermline. The official donation ceremony occurred the following year, and a trust fund in honour of the benefactory, known as Dunfermline Carnegie Trust, was founded for the general maintenance of the glen.

As part of the donation of the estate, the Dunfermline Carnegie Trust invited proposals for the development of the area as a civic space. Two entries were submitted in 1903–04, one of which was by the world-renowned urban planner, naturalist and educationalist Patrick Geddes (1854–1932). His thinking about the commission, as he saw it, to balance preservation of heritage with regeneration, was an important influence in the formation of his ideas in town planning and civic renaissance. The second entry was by the landscape designer, Thomas Mawson. Although neither scheme was adopted, both influenced subsequent work on the establishment of the park as it exists today.

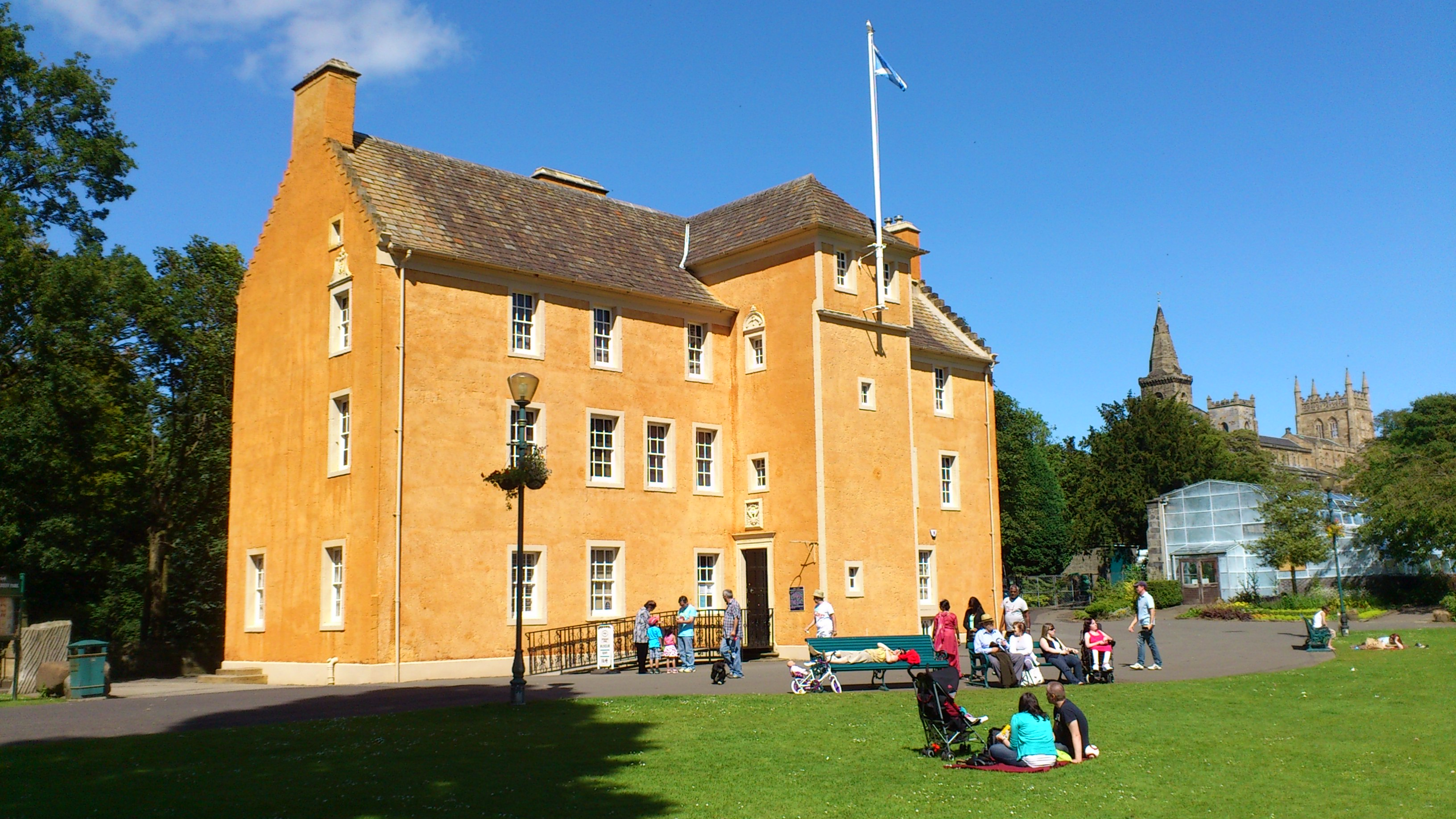
Pittencrieff House in 2011

More architectural features of the park, such as the huge ornate entrance gates, are by Robert Lorimer and were built in 1908.

== Pittencrieff House Museum ==
In the subsequent development of the modern park, Pittencrieff House was designed as a centre piece.

The house was originally built in the 15th century by the Wemyss family. Sir Alexander Clerk of Stenton bought the house and its huge estate in 1610. His eldest son styled himself as Alexander Clerk of Pittencrieff and extended the simple laird's house with two stories and an attic around 1635. Two of the bedrooms were converted to create two long galleries for museum and art exhibition space in a restoration programme undertaken by Sir Robert Lorimar between 1911 and 1913. The house itself served as the Pittencrieff House Museum, with exhibits about the formation of the park and its natural history, including dinosaurs, fossils and wildlife. It closed to the public after the Dunfermline Carnegie Library expanded its exhibition space.

== Park features ==
On the northern boundary of the park lies the prominent statue of Andrew Carnegie which was built in 1914 and a dovecot, in the style of a round tower from around 1770. The main gates to the park known as the Louise Carnegie Gates which opened in 1928 are located to the north-east.

In September 2011 a memorial bench to the rock musician Stuart Adamson who grew up in the Dunfermline area and who died in 2001 was unveiled at the park. It was paid for by fans and is inscribed with some of his lyrics chosen by fans in an online poll.

The park houses an aviary which is home to 9 resident pet peacocks.

The park also holds a former petting zoo, a large greenhouse and three playgrounds.

Pittencreiff park has been home to the Dunfermline Parkrun since its inception in July 2015.

Be Military Fit run classes in the park.

== Friends of Pittencrieff Park ==
The Friends of Pittencrieff Park is a registered charity and a SCIO (Scottish Charitable Incorporated Organisation) which has been in existence since 2004. One of their most important functions is to liaise with Fife Council and the Carnegie Trust to ensure Pittencrieff Park (or the Glen as it is known locally) remains an outstanding visitor attraction for residents of Dunfermline and visitors to the area. They undertake fund raising in order to finance projects such as renewal of play areas. They are involved in the creation and upkeep of the orchard and the sensory garden, looking after flower beds throughout the park and many other projects.

== Notes ==
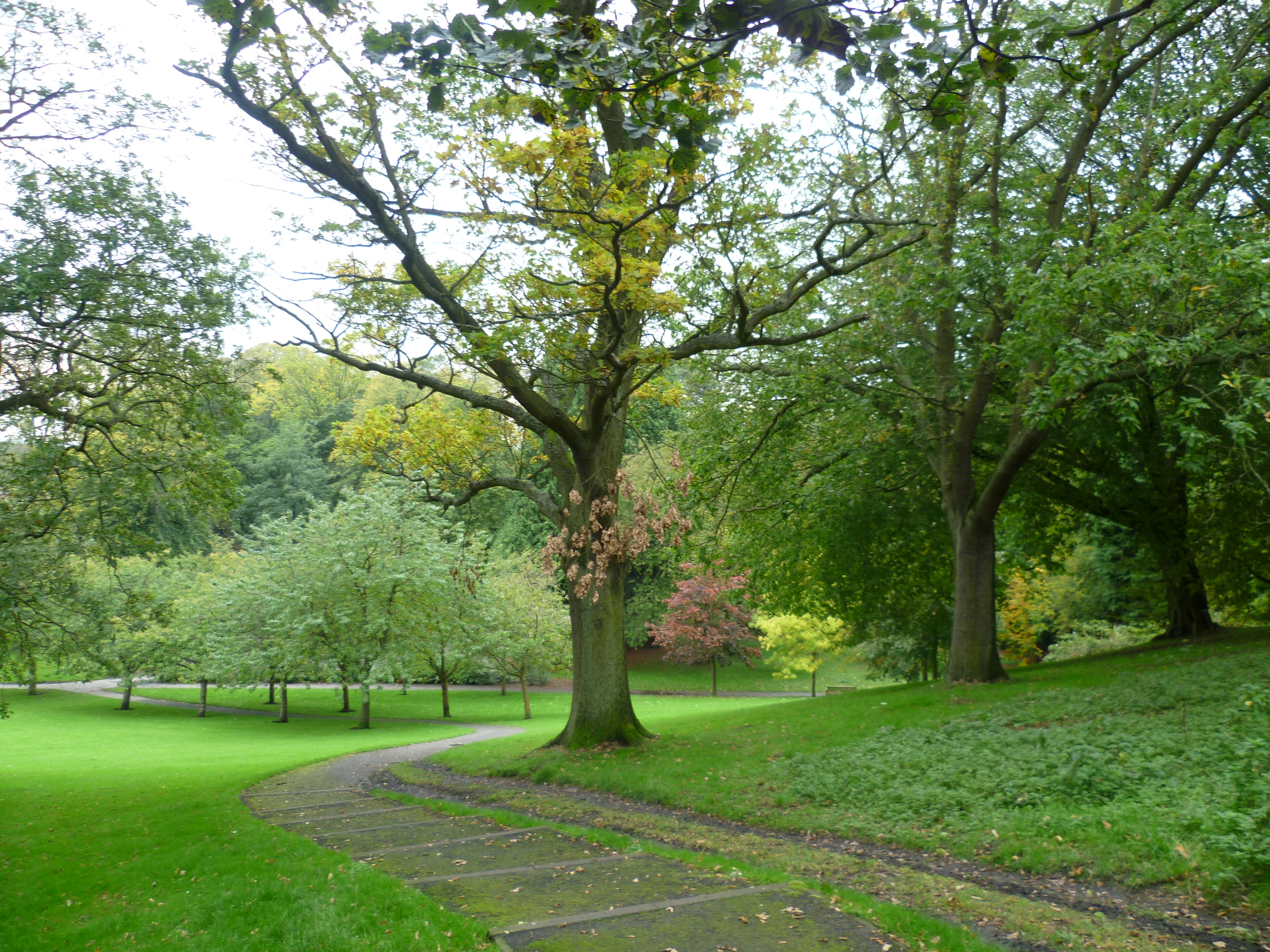
Pittencrieff Park

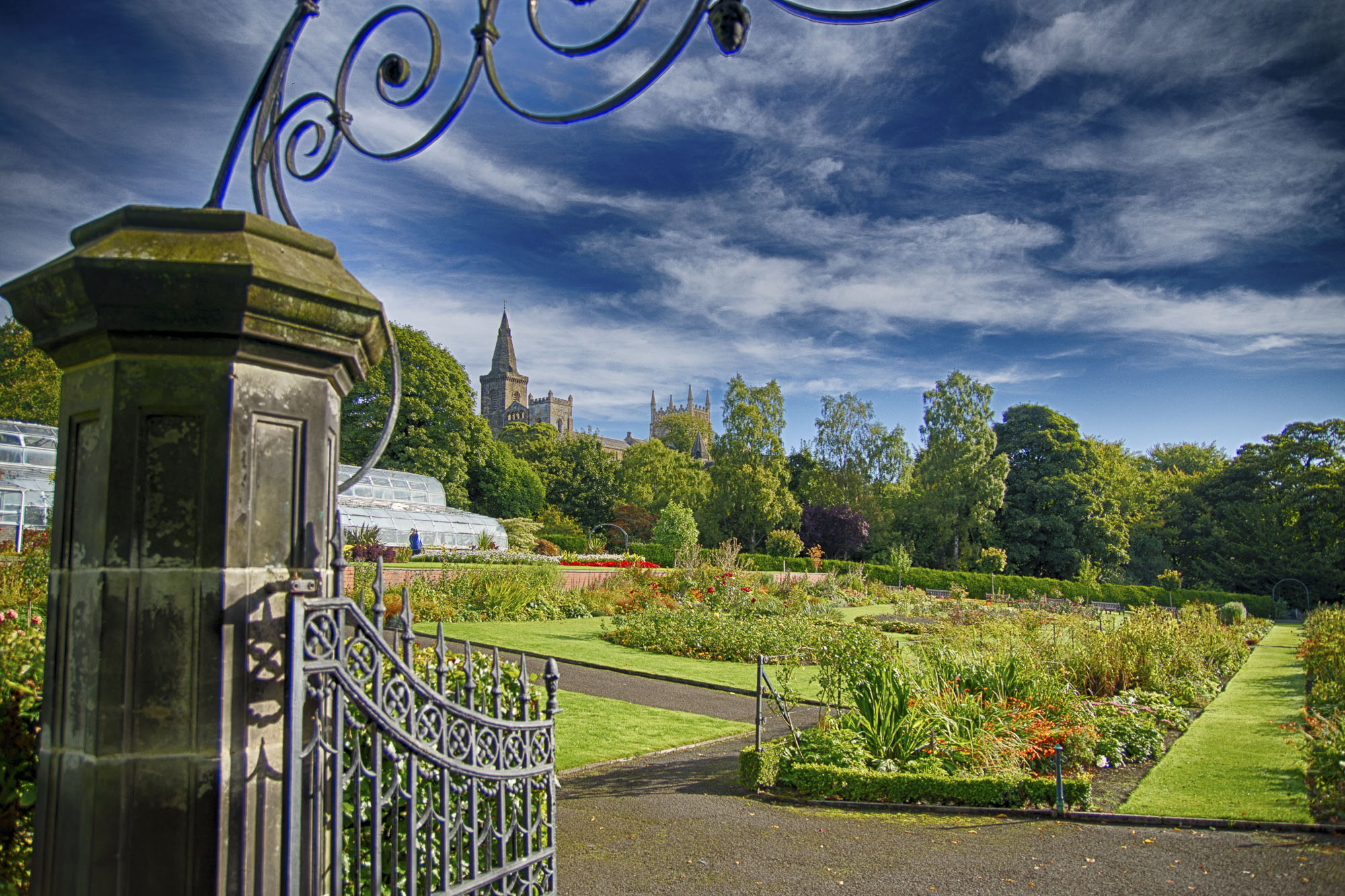
Gardens in Pittencrieff Park

== Bibliography ==
- Hendrie, William F. (2002). Old Dunfermline. Stenlake Publishing. ISBN 1-84033-194-1.
- Pride, Glen L. (1999). Kingdom of Fife (2nd ed.). The Rutland Press.
- Gifford, John (1988). The Buildings of Scotland: Fife.
