= William Colvill =

17th-century minister of the Church of Scotland

William Colvill, sometimes spelt William Colville (c.1612–1675) was a 17th-century Scottish minister of the Church of Scotland and scholar and was the Principal of the University of Edinburgh from 1662 to 1675.

== Life ==
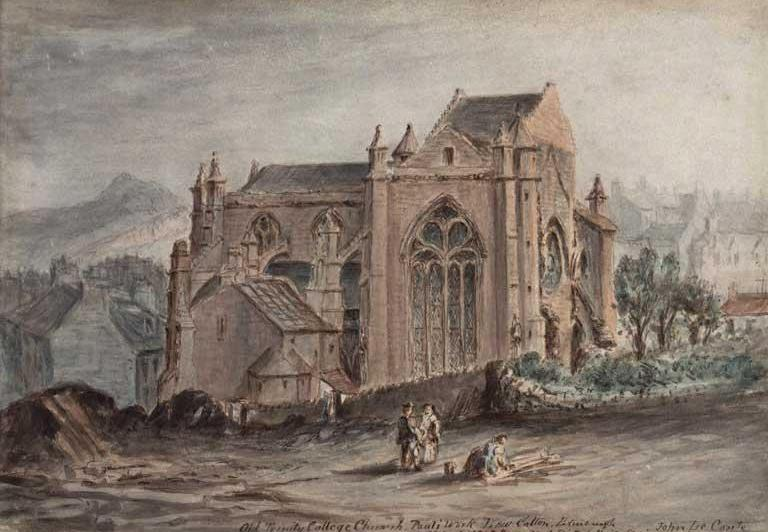
Trinity College Church

Colvill was educated at the University of St Andrews and graduated MA in 1631.

He was ordained as minister of Cramond Kirk just north-west of Edinburgh in 1635. He translated to Trinity College Church in the city in 1639. He moved to the Tron Kirk on Christmas Eve 1641. In the troubles of the English Civil War he obtained the protection of the Marquess of Montrose and was viewed with suspicion for some years. He was suspended by the General Assembly in July 1648 and formally deposed in July 1649. After this he went to Holland where he ministered at the English church in Utrecht.

Colvill had originally been elected principal of the university in April 1652 following the death of John Adamson. However, Colvill openly prayed for King Charles II in Edinburgh and was resultantly imprisoned in Edinburgh Castle, and was forbidden to take office by Cromwell's Government. Therefore, the position was declared vacant again on 17 January 1653, with Dr Robert Leighton being elected Principal instead. However, since Colvill had already given in his demission to his church and left the Netherlands, he was allowed a year's stipend (2000 Scots merks) for his trouble and expense.

In November 1654 he was reponed by the Synod of Lothian and reallowed to minister, being reordained as minister of Perth. When Leighton resigned from the university to become Bishop of Dunblane in 1662, Colvill left Perth and finally became Principal of Edinburgh University.

He was buried in Greyfriars Churchyard on 3 June 1675.

== Family ==
He married Marion Brisbane and had several children:

- John Colvill advocate (d.1679)
- Alexander Colvill (b.1643)
- Janet (b.1646)
- Matthew (b.1647)

Following Marion's death he married Marion Fyfe and had one further son:

- James Colvill (b.1655)

== Publications ==
Colvill was the author of:

- Refreshing streams flowing from the fulnesse of Jesus Christ (London, 1655)
- Philosophia moralis christiana (1670)
- The righteous branch growing out of the root of Jesse, and healing the nations (Edinburgh, 1673)
- Submission to the censures of suspension and deposition, exemplify'd in the case of the very Reverend Mr. Will. Colvill (Hamilton, 1734)

== Notes ==
Academic offices
Preceded by Robert Leighton	Principals of the University of Edinburgh; 1662–1675	Succeeded by Andrew Cant
