= Robert Rollock =

Minister of the Church of Scotland, theologian (c. 1555–1599)

Principal Robert Rollock
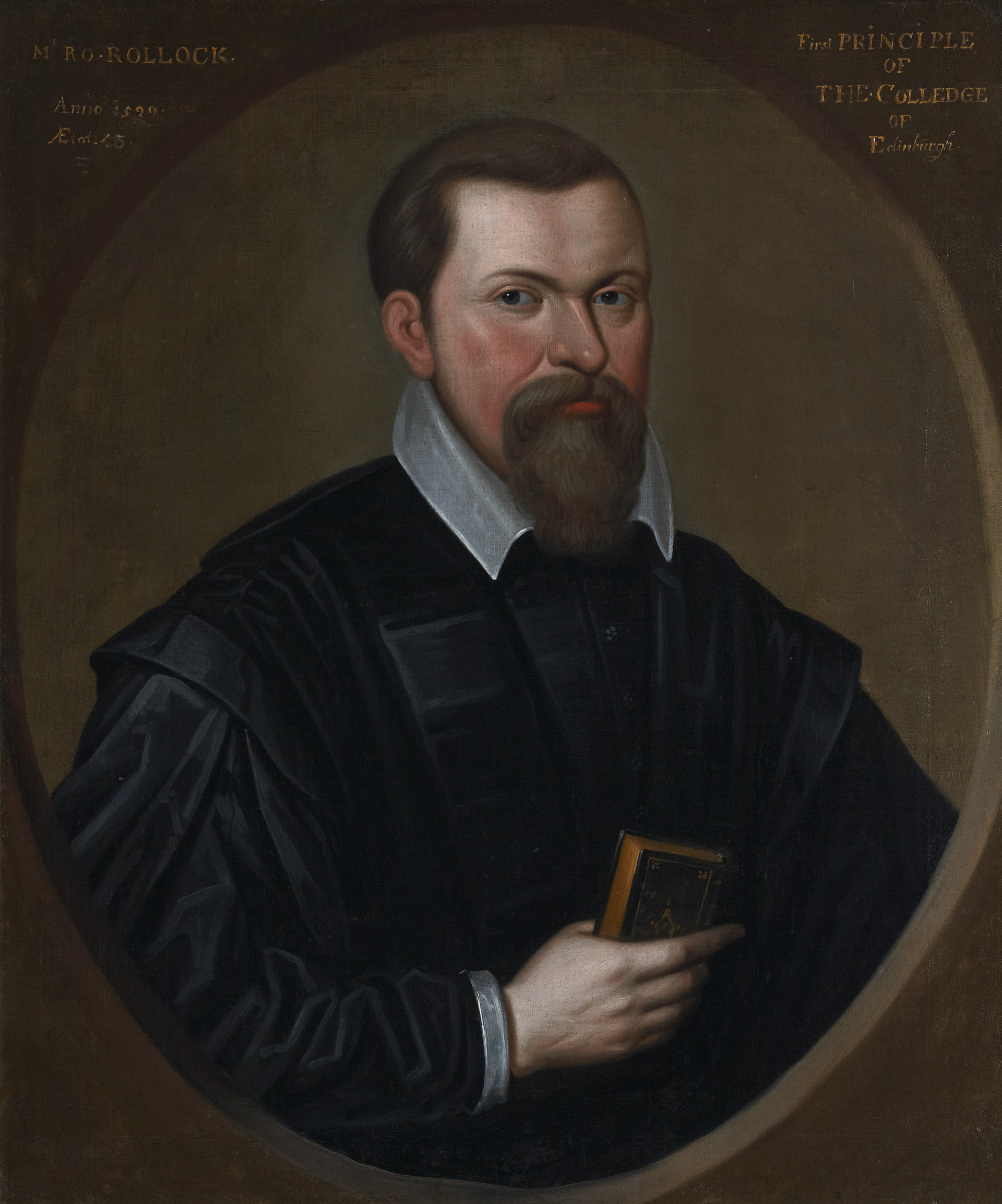
- Robert Rollock, Principal of the University of Edinburgh
- Church: Church of Scotland

Personal details
- Born: c. 1555 Powis, Scotland
- Died: 8 or 9 February 1599 Edinburgh, Scotland
- Education: University of St Andrews, University of Edinburgh

Robert Rollock (c. 1555 – 8 or 9 February 1599) was a Scottish theologian and minister in the Church of Scotland, and the first regent and first principal of the University of Edinburgh. Born into a landowning family, he distinguished himself during his education at the University of St Andrews, which led to him being appointed regent of the newly created college in Edinburgh in 1583, and its first principal in 1586.

After the college had grown and other regents had been appointed, Rollock no longer had to perform everyday teaching, and he became the university's first Professor of Theology. In parallel to his academic duties, he acted as a minister and served in various church functions until his death in 1599. Rollock was acknowledged by his contemporaries as a prolific academic and Biblical scholar, and effective principal.

== Life ==
=== Early life and education ===
Rollock was born in 1555, the son of David Rollock, laird of Powis, near Stirling, and his wife Mariota Livingston. He was one of at least eight children. He received his early education at the school of Stirling from Thomas Buchanan, a nephew of George Buchanan. Rollock then entered St Salvator's College at the University of St Andrews in 1574, obtaining his BA in 1576 and his MA likely in 1577. After graduating, he combined teaching at St Salvator's College with further studies in theology, Hebrew, and Biblical philology at St Mary's College (also in St Andrews) under the tutelage of James Melville. Over the next years, Rollock acquired a national reputation both as a teacher and due to the piety he reportedly instilled in his students. In 1580, he was first made examiner of arts, then director of the faculty of arts, and finally a regent of the University of St Andrews.

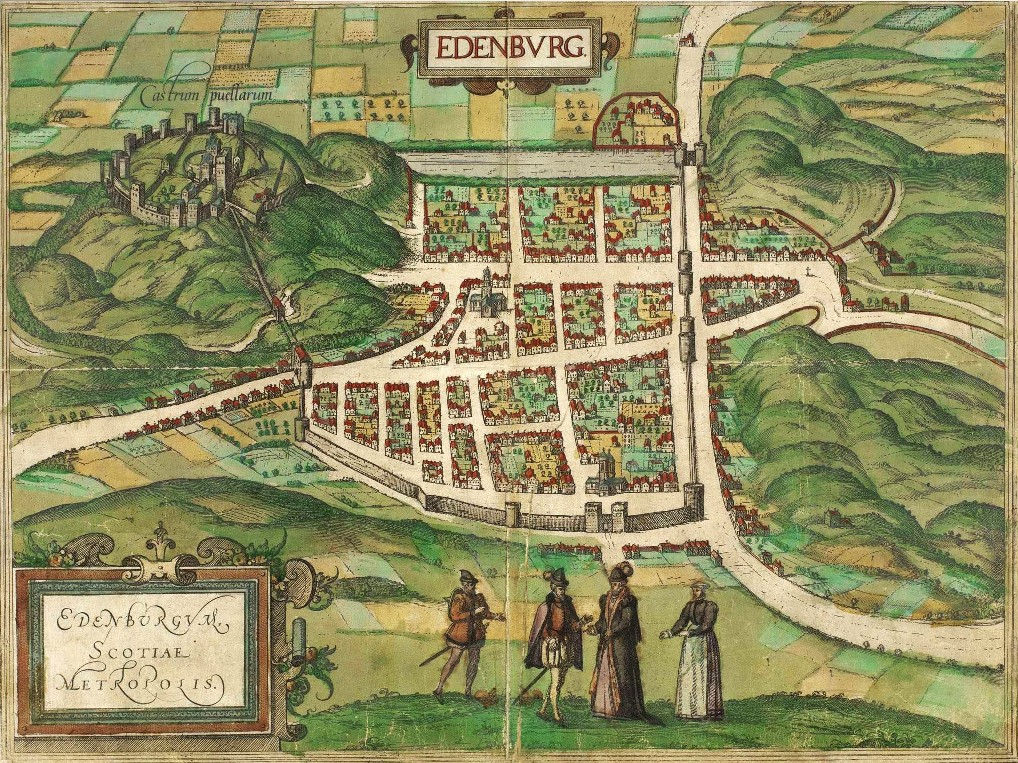
Edinburgh around 1581

=== University of Edinburgh ===
In April 1582, King James VI had granted a royal charter to Edinburgh Town Council for the establishment of a college. First known as Tounis College (Town's College), instruction was to begin in October 1583, but the Town Council was still searching for a regent in September of the same year. James Lawson, John Knox' successor as minister at St Giles' Kirk in Edinburgh, recommended Rollock for the position, and the town sent a delegation to St Andrews to offer the position to him. Rollock agreed and was named the sole regent on 14 September, only one month before the first charge of 80 to 90 students began their education. His appointment was guaranteed for one year; should the college be successful, it was agreed that he should be advanced to the highest post or title that might be created. Rollock's salary was fixed at 40 pound Scots, and the council also agreed to "sustain him and one servant in their ordinary expenses". The tuition fees for the sons of burgesses were set at 40 Shillings, and other students paid three pounds or more; Rollock would be given an augmentation not exceeding 40 merks should the fees not afford him a sufficient salary.

When the university opened, Rollock was the sole instructor for the first-year students; as regent, he was expected to tutor the 1583 intake for the entirety of the four years of their MA degree, and teach all subjects himself. Rollock had drawn up the curriculum and was joined in November by a second master, Duncan Nairn of Glasgow, to do some preparatory teaching. The first year focused on Latin and Greek grammar; the second year featured authors from classical antiquity and arithmetic; year three added Hebrew, ethics, logic, and physics; and the fourth year exposed students to more logic, physics, geography and theology. Rollock's curriculum was deeply influenced by humanist ideals which had also taken root at the universities of Glasgow and St Andrews, but a pioneering course on human anatomy was an innovation.

From May 1585 to February 1586, Rollock was forced to close the college due to an outbreak of plague. In 1586, the Town Council agreed to make Rollock the university's first principal, which meant that after his first class graduated in 1587, he no longer had to perform everyday teaching. The young university grew quickly, which necessitated the appointment of additional regents for subsequent student intakes. In November 1587, the Town Council and local presbytery agreed that Rollock could focus on teaching theology and preach on Sundays, and he was consequently appointed as Professor of Theology with a salary of 400 merks. Rollock instructed students in divinity if they wanted to become ministers after graduating, and saw himself both as an educator and as a spiritual guide to his students. Following his example, the posts of Principal and Professor of Theology remained linked until 1620.

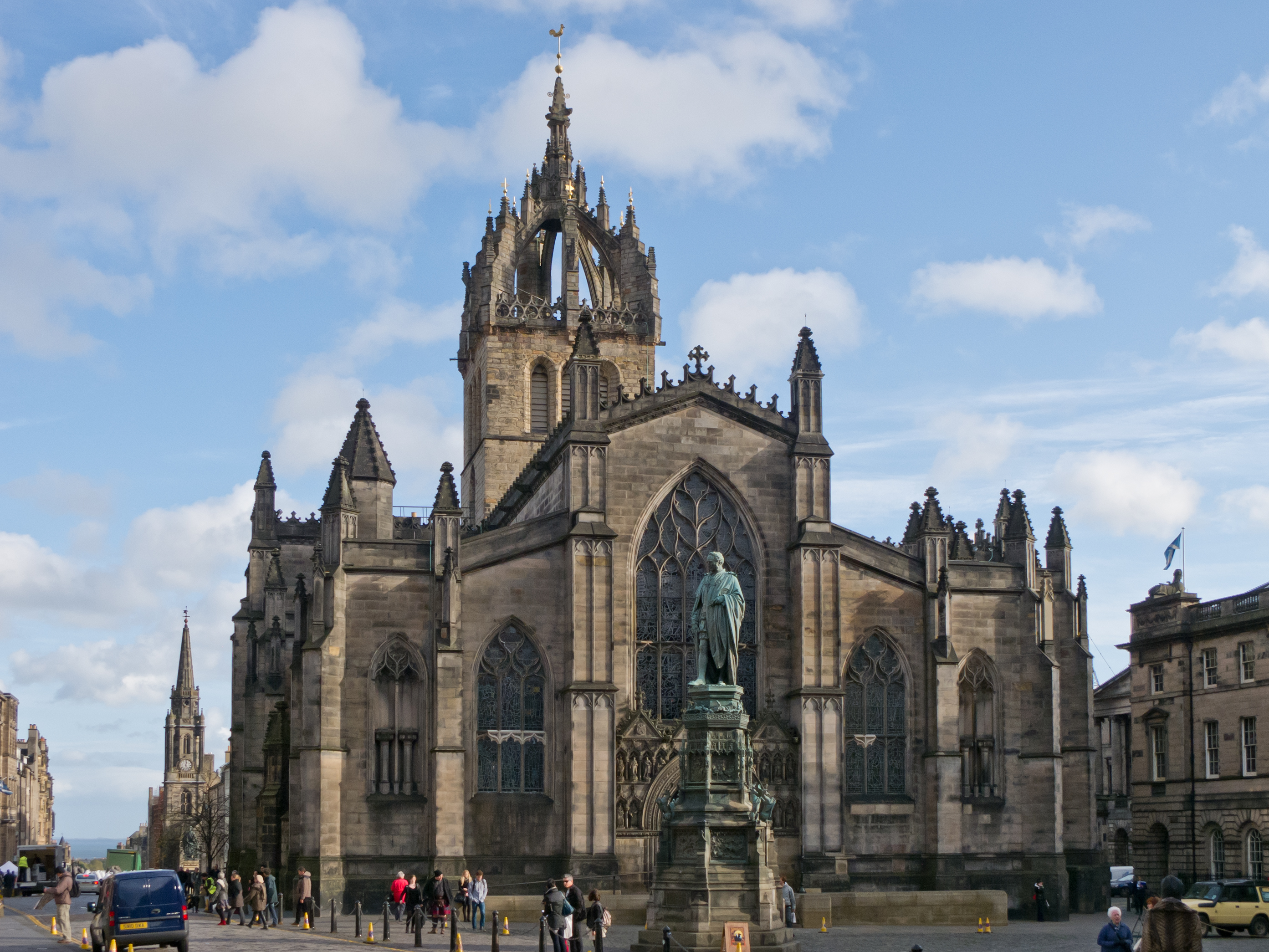
St Giles Cathedral, Edinburgh

=== Later years and church roles ===
Rollock had begun to preach informally at St Giles every Sunday morning as early as September 1587, although he was not ordained as a minister. Another minister took over these duties in December 1589. Rollock played a prominent role in the Church of Scotland and its somewhat troubled church politics, and was appointed on several occasions to committees of presbytery and assemblies on pressing ecclesiastical business.

In 1590, Rollock was appointed assessor to the moderator of the general assembly, and in 1591 was named to a committee of the presbytery of Edinburgh with negotiated with the king on the affairs of the kirk. In connection with the prosecution of the Earls of Angus, Huntly, and Errol for their attempts 'against the true religion', he was chosen to confer with a committee of the estates. In 1595, he was nominated to a commission for the visitation of Scotland's colleges. In the following year, he was appointed with three other ministers to remonstrate with King James VI for his 'hard dealing with the kirk', and especially for his prosecution of David Black.

According to his contemporary David Calderwood, Rollock was "a godly man, but simple in the matters of the church government, credulous, easily led by counsel". This supposed disposition led to him being won over to support the policy of the king in church matters, although Calderwood adds that Rollock understood "his own weakness in following the humours of the king and his commissioners". Rollock supported a proposal made in 1595 that certain ministers should be allowed to sit and vote in parliament as bishops, affirming that "lordship could not be denied them that were to sit in parliament, and allowance of rent to maintain their dignities". Church historian John Row points out that Rollock had previously condemned the office of bishops in his 1590 commentary on the Epistle to the Ephesians. Rollock declared shortly before his death that his principal goal had been that church and state "should mutually assist each other, [...] and that no unnecessary war should be kindled".

In 1596, Rollock accepted one of the eight ministerial charges of the city of Edinburgh, and took charge of his congregation. His sympathy for the king's policies led to the royal party successfully lobbying for Rollock being chosen as moderator of the General Assembly held at Dundee in May 1597. In 1598 he became minister of the Upper Tolbooth—probably the west portion of St. Giles's Kirk—and on 18 April of the same year he was admitted to Magdalen Church, afterwards known as Greyfriars Kirk.

=== Death and legacy ===
Rollock had repeatedly been in poor health throughout his life, and he was perhaps overworked; he died in Edinburgh on 8 February 1599, aged only 44. On his deathbed, Rollock stated that he wanted the university to remain chiefly a place of spiritual instruction, and that he was strongly opposed to the introduction of professors of law and medicine. He also requested that his former student Henry Charteris would be made his successor, a wish which was granted by the Town Council.

David Calderwood, in his 1646 Historie of the Kirk of Scotland, criticises Rollock's perceived weakness towards the king, but admits that he was "a man of good conversation and a powerful preacher". Rollock was considered a scholar of 'great learning', who also effectively discharged the duties of professor and principal of the university in its early days.

Rollock was the author of numerous theological works, the majority of them being commentaries or expositions of scripture. He was internationally recognised for his Bible commentaries, and over 40 of his works were printed in Edinburgh, Geneva, Heidelberg and Herborn. His writings on the Epistle to the Ephesians and the Epistle to the Romans won particular praise, with Geneva theologian Theodore Beza stating he had "never read in this kind of interpretation any thing exceeding them in elegance and sound judgement united with brevity". In two works published in 1596/97, Rollock may be one of the first exponents of covenant theology in Britain.

Rollock married Helen Barroun, daughter of James Barroun of Kinnaird, around 1587. The couple had a posthumous daughter, Jean, who married Robert Balcanquhal, minister of Tranent.

The university commemorates Rollock with a plaque on the south side of Old College, at the entrance to the main university reception. A contemporary portrait of Rollock is displayed in the foyer of the University Library's Main Building on George Square.

== Works ==
Rollock encouraged his students to apply Ramist logic and analysis to their readings of scripture, and he used the same approach in his published works. Rollock's principal works are:

1. Commentarius in Epistolam ad Ephesios, Edinburgh, 1590; Geneva, 1593.
2. Commentarius in Librum Danielis Prophetæ, Edinburgh, 1591; St. Andrews, 1594.
3. Analysis Epistolæ ad Romanos, Edinburgh, 1594.
4. Quæstiones et Responsiones aliquot de Fœdere Dei et de Sacramentis, Edinburgh, 1596.
5. Tractatus de Efficaci Vocatione, Edinburgh, 1597.
6. Commentarius in utramque Epistolam ad Thessalonicenses, et Analysis in Epistolam ad Philemonem, cum Notis Joan. Piscatoris, Edinburgh, 1598; Herborn, in Hesse-Nassau, 1601; translated under the title 'Lectures upon the First and Second Epistles to the Thessalonians,' Edinburgh, 1606.
7. Certaine Sermons upon several places of the Epistles of Paul, Edinburgh, 1599.
8. Commentarius in Joannis Evangelium, una cum Harmonia ex iv Evangelistis in Mortem, Resurrectionem, et Ascensionem Dei, Geneva, 1599; Edinburgh, 1599.
9. Commentarius in selectos aliquot Psalmos, Geneva, 1598, 1599; translated as 'An Exposition of some select Psalms of David,' Edinburgh, 1600.
10. Commentarius in Epistolas ad Corinthios, Herborn, in Hesse-Nassau, 1600.
11. Commentarius in Epistolam ad Colossenses, Edinburgh, 1600; Geneva, 1602.
12. Analysis Logica in Epistolam ad Galatas, Edinburgh, 1602; Geneva, 1603.
13. Tractatus brevis de Providentia Dei, et Tractatus de Excommunicatione, Geneva, 1602; London, 1604.
14. A Treatise of Gods Effectual Calling, translated by H. Holland, London, 1603.
15. Commentarius in Epistolam ad Hebræos, Edinburgh, 1605.
16. Lectures upon the History of the Passion, Edinburgh, 1616.
17. Episcopal Government instituted by Christ, and confirmed by Scripture and Reason, London, 1641.

Soon after his death eleven sermons (Certaine Sermons upon Several Places of the Epistles of Paul, 1599) were published from notes taken by his students. Selected Works of Rollock, edited by William Gunn, D.D., with the Latin life by Charteris, and notes to it, was printed by the Wodrow Society, Edinburgh, 1844–49.

== Bibliography ==
- Selected works of Robert Rollock, ed. W. M. Gunn, 2 vols., Wodrow Society, 1844–9
  - Life by Charteris, with notes, prefixed to the above edition
- De Vita et Morte Roberti Rollok, auctoribus Georgio Robertson et Henrico Charteris, Bannatyne Club, 1826
- The Historie of the Kirk of Scotland, David Calderwood, ed. T. Thomson and D. Laing, 8 vols., Wodrow Society, 1842–9
- The Story of the University of Edinburgh during its First Three Hundred Years, by Sir Alexander Grant, 2 vols, Longmans, Green, and Co., 1884
- Robert Rollock: First Principal of the University of Edinburgh, by William Garden Blaikie, Religious Tract Society, 1884

Preceded by None	Edinburgh University Principals; 1586–1599	Succeeded by Henry Charteris
