= Henry Charteris =

Scottish minister and Principal of the University of Edinburgh

Henry Charteris the younger (1565–1628) was a Scottish minister and Principal of the University of Edinburgh from 1599 to 1620.

== Life ==
He was the eldest son of Henry Charteris, Printer to the King in Scotland (this status allowed printing of Bibles and other restricted books). He was educated at the University of Edinburgh, graduating with an MA 1587 and made a "Regent" (the equivalent of a Fellow) in 1589. He was a student in the first class taught by Robert Rollock, which numbered four future professors, two of whom, Charteris and Patrick Sands, later became principals of the university. In 1599 he was appointed Professor of Divinity and, following the death of Rollock, Charteris was also appointed Principal, having been recommended by Rollock on his deathbed.

To the principalship was then attached the professorship of divinity, and the salary, which had been four hundred, was increased in 1601 to six hundred Scots merks. In 1617, when James VI and I visited Scotland, a disputation was held before him at Stirling Castle by the professors of the university, but Charteris declined to take part in it. Among the royal puns on this occasion, James is said to joked on Charteris, 'His name agreeth very well unto nature, for charters contain much matter yet say nothing, but put great purposes in men's mouths.'

On 20 March 1620 Charteris resigned his office, having been called to be minister of North Leith. On 19 April 1627 he was recalled to fill the chair of professor of divinity, with a salary of a thousand merks and a house. He died in July 1628 and his position as Principal was filled by Patrick Sands.

== Publications ==
- "The Life and Death of Principal Rollock", originally in Latin, translated into English and published by the Wodrow Society in 1826.

== Family ==
The name of his first wife is unknown but she died at or soon after the birth of their only daughter Margaret Charteris in September 1600.

In September 1602 he then married Agnes Mason with whom he had:

- Henry Charteris WS (b.June 1603)
- Isobel (b.1605) married Laurence Henderson, an Edinburgh burgess
- Catherine (b.1609)
- William Charteris (b.1610)
- Agnes (b.1611)
- Rachel (b.1612)

His second wife then died and he married his third wife, Janet Bell, daughter of Rev John Bell. With her he had:

- Jean (b.1617)
- Elizabeth (b.1618)
- Catherine (b.1620)
- Thomas Charteris
- Rev John Charteris minister of Currie near Edinburgh

Academic offices
Preceded by Robert Rollock	Principals of Edinburgh University; 1599–1620	Succeeded by Patrick Sands
