= John Adamson (university principal) =

Scottish minister and academic

John Adamson MA (1576–1653) was a Scottish minister and academic. Adamson was Principal of the University of Edinburgh from 1623 until his death in 1653.

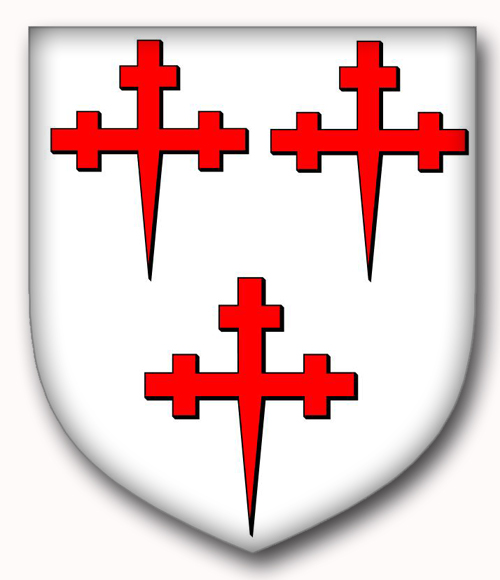
Arms of John Adamson

== Life ==
Adamson's father, Henry, who served as Provost of Perth, was an elder brother of Patrick Adamson, Archbishop of St Andrews.

Educated at Perth Grammar School, Adamson proceeded early to the University of St Andrews, where subsequently he held the professorial chair of philosophy. In 1597 he graduated with an MA from the University of Edinburgh and in 1598 he was made a "regent of philosophy", the equivalent of a modern Fellow, at the University. As a regent he would lecture to younger students. In 1604, having been presented to the church of North Berwick, he became minister of that parish. In March 1609, under patronage of King James VI, he was translated to the parish of Liberton, south of Edinburgh.

In 1616, he sat on the Aberdeen General Assembly and was asked to draw up a liturgy and catechism specifically for children.

In 1623, following Robert Boyd of Trochrig's resignation on grounds of ill-health, Adamson was appointed Principal of the University of Edinburgh, a post which he then held until his death in 1651. He was succeeded by Robert Leighton, who did not take office until 1653 after outside interference with the original choice, William Colvill.

== Family ==
In 1607 he married Marion Auchmoutie (d. 1651) daughter of Thomas Auchmoutie, an Edinburgh merchant. Their children were David Adamson (b. 1608) and Marie (b. 1611).

== Works ==
Adamson was a close friend of Andrew Melville, and it is believed that he collected the Latin poems of Andrew Melville, under the title Viri clarissimi A. Melvini Mvsae (1620). His own works include Dioptrae Gloriae Divinae (1637), a commentary on Psalm XIX, and Methodus Religionis Christianae (1637). His Traveller's Joy, to which is added The Ark (1623) are poetry.

He edited the Muses Welcome (1617); it preserved speeches, theses and poems by himself and many contemporaries (among them Alexander Hume, David Hume, Drummond of Hawthornden, David Wedderburn, Robert Boyd, and David Primrose), and includes Drummond's 'Panegyricke to the King,' which contains his enumeration of the rivers of Scotland. Nichols's Progresses of James I preserves the speeches.

== Notes ==
Academic offices
Preceded by Robert Boyd	Principals of the University of Edinburgh; 1623–1652	Succeeded by Robert Leighton
