= Patrick Sands =

Patrick Sands (c. 1567–1635) was the third Principal of the University of Edinburgh, serving from 1620 until demitting office in 1622.

== Life ==
He was educated as a member of the original class to enter the University of Edinburgh on its opening in 1583, graduating in 1587. He tutored at the University from 1589 to 1597, before travelling abroad, studying law and practising as an advocate. He was a "layman who had been unsuccessful at the bar".

In 1620 Henry Charteris resigned as Principal of the University, and Sands was appointed by the town council, in an act which "many thought scandalous nepotism" – Sands was the brother-in-law of David Aikinhead, a prominent councillor and future Lord Provost. The Principal had previously doubled as Professor of Divinity, but as Sands was not a theologian, Andrew Ramsay was separately appointed Professor of Divinity and Rector. He was Principal from March 1620 until his resignation in August 1622.

From 1620 until 1622 he was "second charge" to Old Greyfriars alongside Andrew Ramsay in first charge.

He resigned from all posts in 1622 and died in 1635.

== Family ==
In 1606 he married Marion Aikinhead sister of David Aikinhead the Lord Provost of Edinburgh.

== Notes ==
Academic offices
Preceded by Henry Charteris	Principals of Edinburgh University; 1620–1622	Succeeded by Robert Boyd
