= Malcolm's Tower =

Ruined tower in Dunfermline, Scotland

- Malcolm Canmore's Tower
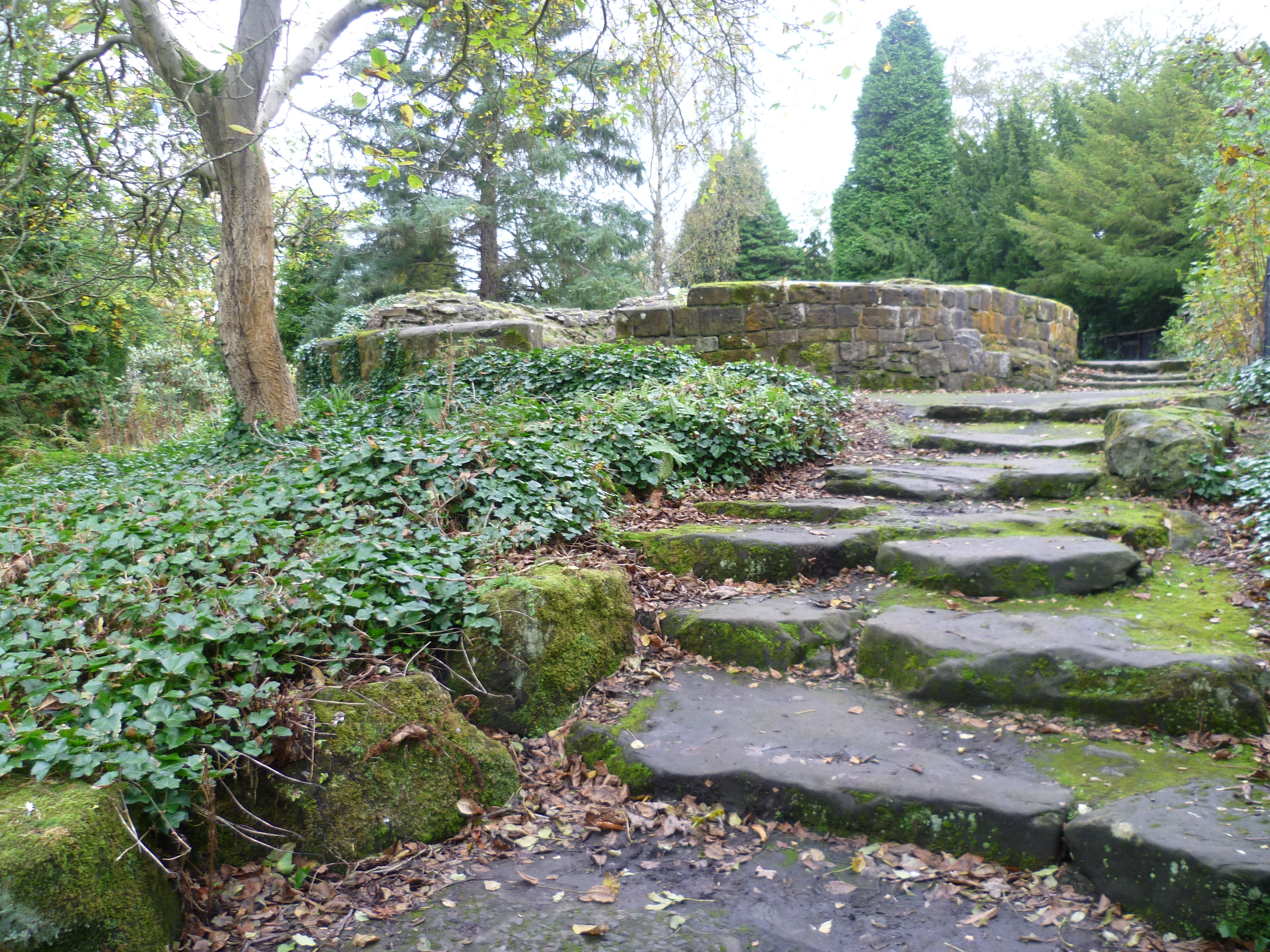
- Approach to the Tower
- Interactive map of Malcolm's Tower
- 56.06994°N 3.46697°W
- Type: Tower
- Etymology: Malcolm III of Scotland
- Location: Dunfermline, Scotland
- OS grid reference: NT 08773 87316

Site notes
- Material: Stone
- Condition: Ruined
- Public access: Yes

Scheduled monument
- Official name: Malcolm Canmore's Tower
- Designated: 5 February 1992
- Reference no.: SM5287

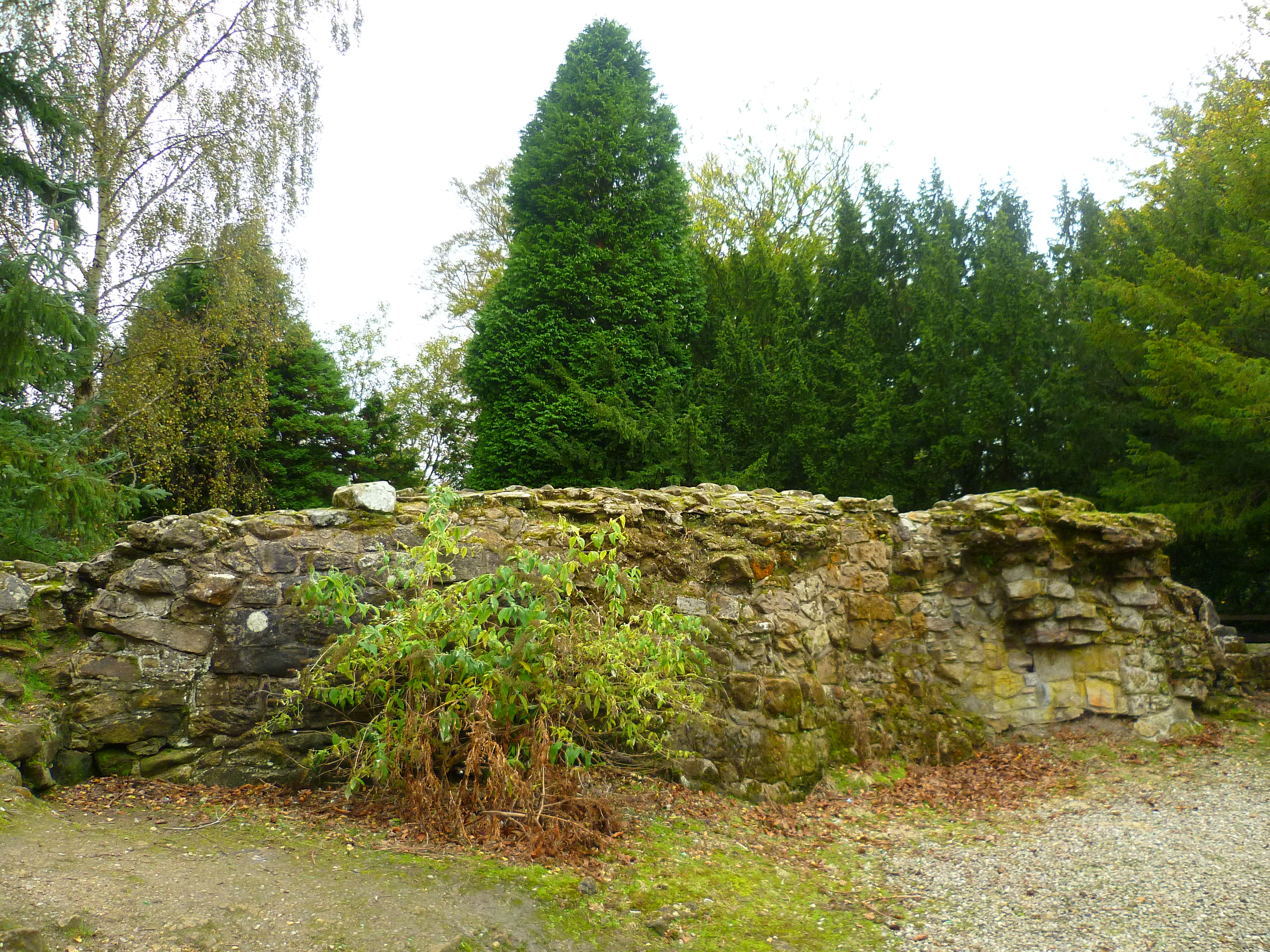
Ruins of the Tower

Malcolm's Tower, also known as Malcolm Canmore's Tower, is a historic site in the Scottish city of Dunfermline, Fife. It consists of the foundations of a rubble built, rectangular tower enclosed by an oval shaped modern wall and is protected as a scheduled monument. It is located in Pittencrieff Park.

The tower stood on a highly defensible peninsular outcrop of rock above a deep ravine and is the site from which the city derives its name. It was effectively the seat of royal power in Scotland after Malcolm III of Scotland shifted the centre of government from Forteviot to Dunfermline in the mid 11th century. The site was also close to a religious centre which had begun as a Culdee establishment in the 9th century. The first mention of the tower in the historical record is from 1070 when Malcolm III married his queen, Princess Margaret. As queen, Margaret introduced innovations which changed the course and identity of the Church in Scotland. Not far to the east of the tower's location are the remains of Dunfermline Abbey and later royal palace.

All that survives of the tower today are foundational fragments of wall, but an image of the building was adopted at an early date as the burgh arms for Dunfermline. Old wax seals suggest it to have been a building of two storeys with an attic. It might have contained around twenty small apartments. Before the western access road to Dunfermline was built, Malcolm's Tower would have been an almost impregnable fortress, perhaps rather like a broch, and this almost certainly explains Dunfermline's motto Esto rupes inaccessa (Be an inaccessible rock).

The opening lines of the traditional "Ballad of Sir Patrick Spens" are thought to refer to the tower:

The King sits in Dunfermling Toun
Drynking the bluid-red wyne …

== See also ==
- Scheduled monuments in Fife
