= List of principals of the University of Edinburgh =

Principals of the University of Edinburgh

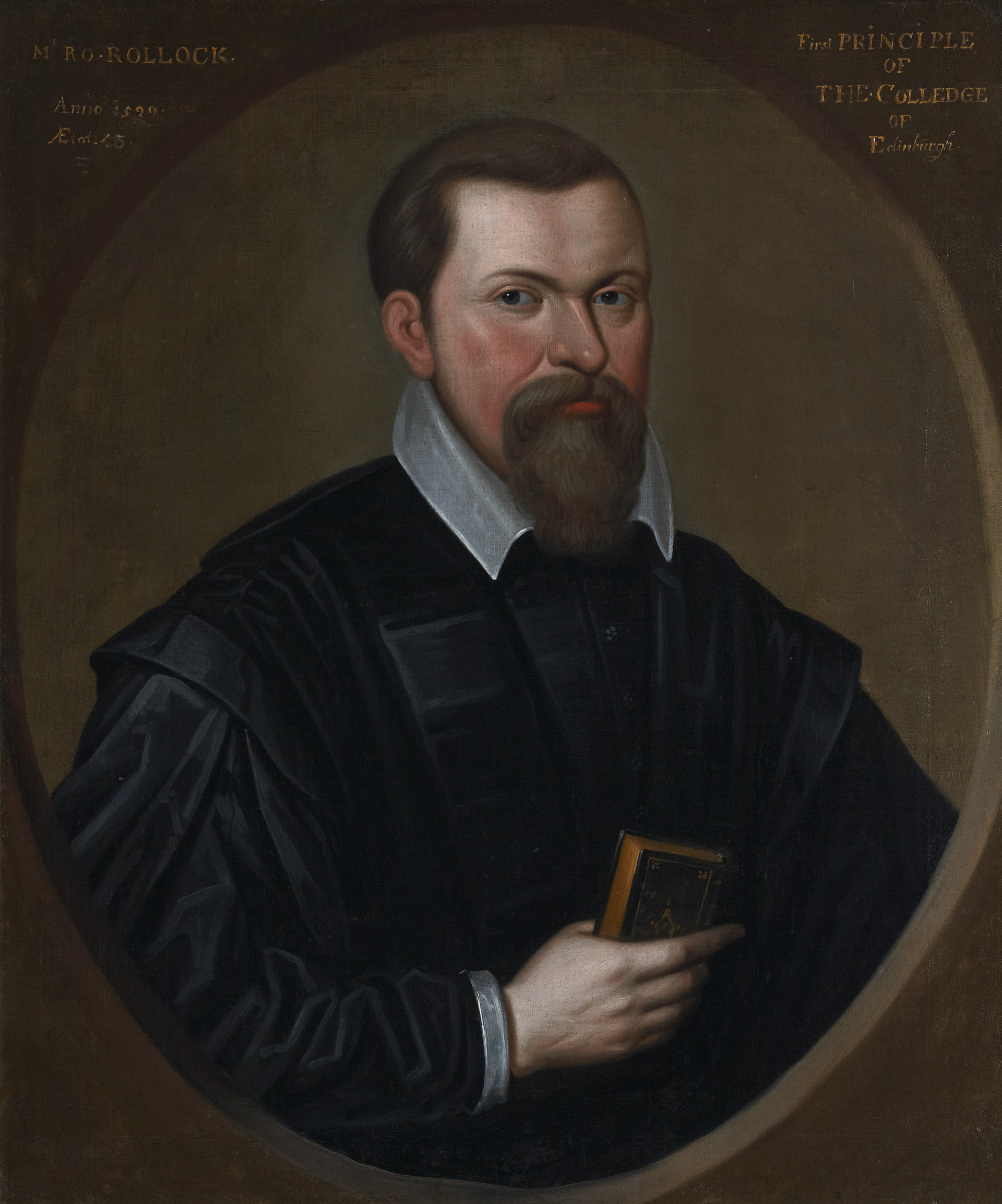
Robert Rollock

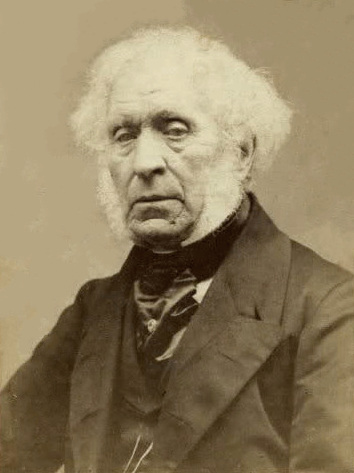
Sir David Brewster

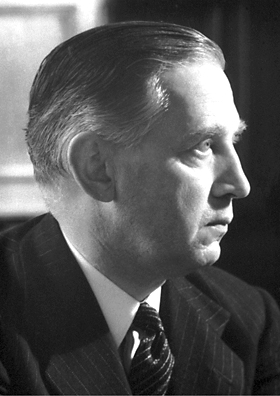
Sir Edward Appleton

- 1586 Robert Rollock (Regent from 1583 to 1586)
- 1599 Henry Charteris
- 1620 Patrick Sands
- 1622 Robert Boyd
- 1623 John Adamson (died in office in 1652 but the original successor, William Colvill, was unable to take the position until 1662)
- 1653 Robert Leighton
- 1662 William Colvill
- 1675 Andrew Cant
- 1685 Alexander Monro
- 1690 Gilbert Rule
- 1703 William Carstares
- 1716 William Wishart (primus)
- 1730 William Hamilton
- 1732 James Smith
- 1736 William Wishart (secundus)
- 1754 John Gowdie
- 1762 William Robertson
- 1793 George Husband Baird
- 1840 John Lee
- 1859 David Brewster
- 1868 Alexander Grant
- 1885 William Muir
- 1903 William Turner
- 1916 Alfred Ewing
- 1929 Thomas Henry Holland
- 1944 John Fraser
- 1948 Edward Victor Appleton
- 1965 Michael Swann
- 1974 Hugh Robson
- 1979 John Harrison Burnett
- 1987 David Smith
- 1994 Stewart Sutherland
- 2002 Timothy O'Shea
- 2018 Peter Mathieson

== See also ==
- Ancient university governance in Scotland
- Chancellor of the University of Edinburgh
- Rector of the University of Edinburgh
