= Queen's Cross Church =

Queen's Cross Church may refer to one of two Church of Scotland churches:

- Queen's Cross Church, Aberdeen, consecrated in 1881
- Queen's Cross Church, Glasgow, designed by Charles Rennie Mackintosh and consecrated in 1899

== See also ==
- Queen's Cross, an area in Aberdeen, Scotland
