= Scott Rennie =

Minister of the Church of Scotland

The Reverend Scott Rennie
- Born: 31 March 1972 (age 54); Bucksburn, Aberdeen
- Education: University of Aberdeen; Union Theological Seminary in the City of New York; Pittsburgh Theological Seminary

Ecclesiastical career
- Church: Church of Scotland
- Ordained: 4 November 1999
- Offices held: Crown Court Church; Brechin Cathedral; Queen's Cross Church, Aberdeen; St Giles' Cathedral

Scott Martin Rennie FRSA (born 31 March 1972) is a Scottish clergyman who is the Minister of St Giles' Cathedral, Edinburgh. He was formerly Minister of Brechin Cathedral from 1999 to 2009 and Queen's Cross Church, Aberdeen until 2022, and Crown Court Church, London until 2025.

== Background ==
Rennie was born on 31 March 1972 in Bucksburn, Aberdeen, Scotland. He studied geography at the University of Aberdeen, and Divinity at Christ's College, Aberdeen. He served as assistant minister at Queen's Cross Church, Aberdeen, studying for a Masters in Sacred Theology at Union Theological Seminary in New York City on a Scots Fellowship. Rennie was a member of the Church of Scotland's taskforce on human sexuality until it was disbanded in 2012.

Rennie married Ruth, and they had a daughter together. After five years of marriage they separated and divorced. Rennie subsequently formed a relationship with his now husband, David Smith who is deputy head of College of Arts, Humanities, and Social Sciences at the University of Edinburgh and a Religion scholar. Rennie is a member of the Liberal Democrats and was their candidate for the Angus constituency in the 2005 UK general election. He is also a supporter of Aberdeen Football Club.

== Ministry and controversy ==
=== 2008-2009: Call from Queen's Cross Church ===
On 23 November 2008, Rennie preached as sole nominee for Queen's Cross Church, having informed the congregation of his circumstances. At the conclusion of the service, following a secret ballot, he was duly declared Minister Elect by 140 votes to 28. Subsequently, 246 members of the church and 13 other adherents signed the Call.

The call from Queen's Cross Church was upheld by the Presbytery of Aberdeen on 6 January 2009 by 60 votes to 24. This was the first time that a congregation and presbytery had voted to sustain the call of an openly gay minister within the Church of Scotland. However, following the presbytery's vote which allowed Rennie to proceed to Queen's Cross Parish Church, a group of 12 ministers and elders within the Presbytery, led by Ian Aitken (New Stockethill, New Charge Development, Aberdeen), dissented and complained to the Commission of the General Assembly.

On 25 March 2009, following a narrow majority of 1, it was agreed by the Commission that the case be referred to the General Assembly, the Church of Scotland's supreme court, for judgement. It was the first time that a presbytery's decision to sustain the call of a minister had been challenged in the church's supreme court since the Disruption of 1843.

Following an apology from evangelical Church of Scotland organisation Forward Together over an incorrect statement concerning Rennie's personal circumstances, a conversation between Rennie and OneKirk Convener, Peter Johnston, was published, in which Rennie spoke about the challenge of growing up in a conservative church:

As a young man growing up in a conservative church, it felt impossible to deal with issues around my own sexuality. It did not feel like a safe environment, and certainly not one in which I could have found support and understanding. So, I came to believe that I had to ignore it and do what I thought was the right thing at the time: live a heterosexual life.

Judith Pearson and Trevor Salmon, joint session clerks of Queen's Cross, wrote to The Herald newspaper in support of Rennie, saying:

The congregation were fully conversant with all relevant facts before they voted for and signed the call to Scott Rennie. Our call is based upon his gifts and our corresponding needs, and upon our real sense that he is the person best equipped to serve alongside us and to offer leadership to us.

=== 2009: General Assembly ===
The case against Rennie was titled Aitken and Others versus the Presbytery of Aberdeen, and heard on Saturday 23 May 2009. It was intended to answer the following question:

What was the law of the Church at the time (6 January 2009) the Presbytery of Aberdeen made the decision that has been challenged; and was the Presbytery entitled to make the decision it made in the light of the legal position at that time?

On the same evening that Rennie's case was heard, an overture (motion) was to be received from the, then, Presbytery of Lochcarron-Skye which, in the light of Rennie's call to Queen's Cross, sought to prevent anyone in an extra-marital sexual relationship from working in the church:

No court or agency of the Church may accept for training, ordain, admit, re-admit, induct or introduce to any ministry of the Church anyone involved in a sexual relationship outside of faithful marriage between a man and a woman.

William J. U. Philip, the minister of St George's-Tron Church, Glasgow, in concert with Forward Together, founded an online petition in order to support this overture, which received 12,555 signatures, including 481 Church of Scotland Ministers and 33 Kirk Sessions, and also to express their opposition to the appointment of Rennie.

On the opening day of the Church of Scotland's General Assembly, Thursday 21 May, an attempt was made to change the order of business by hearing the Lochcarron-Skye overture before the Rennie case, against the legal advice of the Overture and Appeals Committee. The attempt to change the order of business was interpreted by some as being designed to strengthen the cause of those opposed to Rennie's appointment. Speaking to his motion, Peter Parks argued that it would be illogical to decide a specific case without having already established the principle against which the case would be tested. The General Assembly was unconvinced and comfortably defeated Parks's motion, having been persuaded that it would be unjust to hear the overture first due to the danger of anachronism.

On the day of Rennie's hearing, 23 May, a protest against the appointment was held outside the General Assembly Hall by around twenty members of Glasgow's Zion Baptist Church. The American Westboro Baptist Church announced its intention to picket the meeting of the General Assembly on 23 May and Queen's Cross Church on 24 May, although this did not go ahead. A counter-protest was held by a number of groups, including Liberal Youth Scotland, the Scottish youth wing of the Liberal Democrats, which attracted around eighty demonstrators.

On 23 May, the General Assembly voted 326 to 267 to uphold the nomination of Rennie. 121 commissioners formally dissented in writing against this decision. Debate on the Lochcarron-Skye overture was postponed until Monday 25 May, when it was decided to establish a two-year Special Commission on the issue reporting in 2011. A moratorium on the induction and ordination of openly gay ministers was passed until that time, and a ban on making public statements concerning the induction and ordination of gay ministers also came into effect.

In January 2009, a censurable allegation against Rennie, that his 'lifestyle' constituted a great 'public scandal' (or Fama Clamosa in Church of Scotland law), was lodged with the Presbytery of Angus (in which Brechin Cathedral resides). A committee of three was formed to investigate this allegation, but it was immediately suspended due to the pending Aitken and Others versus the Presbytery of Aberdeen case. On 25 May, the General Assembly passed a motion moved by Allan McCafferty, which clarified the General Assembly's will that Rennie be inducted into the charge of Queen's Cross Church, without further hindrance:

For the avoidance of doubt affirm that the provisions of this whole motion shall in no way be interpreted as offering grounds for challenging the decision of the General Assembly of 2009 in the Referred Case heard in Session V and all other related matters of process [emphasis added].

On Wednesday 3 June, an Angus Presbytery Investigating Committee met to consider the allegation against Rennie that his 'lifestyle' was not acceptable for a minister of the gospel. However, this charge was not upheld and Rennie was released to move to Aberdeen Presbytery, where he was subsequently inducted into the charge of Queen's Cross Parish Church on Friday 3 July at 1900. On Sunday 5 July, James Simpson, a former moderator of the General Assembly of the Church of Scotland, led worship and preached the first sermon by way of welcome to Rennie.

=== 2009–2022: Minister of Queen's Cross Church ===
Rennie was nominated for, and subsequently won, the award of 'Hero of the Year' at the Fourth Annual Stonewall Awards, which took place on Thursday 5 November 2009. On 24 March 2010 he was given the ceremonial role of Burgess of Guild of the City of Aberdeen.

On Thursday 24 February, Rennie was invited to participate in a debate at the Cambridge Union Society entitled: 'This House Believes the Path to Success is Straight.' Alongside Lieutenant Commanders Craig Jones MBE and Mandy McBain, Rennie proposed the motion, while Lord Smith of Finsbury, Andrew Pierce, and Femi Otitoju were narrowly successful in opposing it.

On Sunday 31 July 2011, the U.S. Westboro Baptist Church announced its intention to picket Queen's Cross Church, Aberdeen on 30 October 2011. Member of the Scottish Parliament Mark McDonald lodged motion S4M-00609 ('Planned Westboro Baptist Church Visit to Aberdeen') in the Scottish Parliament in order to 'call' on Home Secretary Theresa May to confirm the continuation of the 2009 ban on Fred Phelps and Shirley Phelps-Roper and to extend it to other members of the Westboro Baptist Church:

That the Parliament notes the stated intention of the Westboro Baptist Church to picket Queen's Cross Church in Aberdeen in protest at the presence of the Reverend Scott Rennie; further notes that the Westboro Baptist Church has gained notoriety for its extreme, homophobic views and pickets of American soldiers' funerals; also notes that the head of the church, Pastor Fred Phelps, and his daughter, Shirley Phelps-Roper, appeared on a list of individuals banned from entering the United Kingdom in 2009; considers that the views espoused by Pastor Phelps and his followers have no place in 21st century Scotland, and calls on the Home Secretary to confirm the continuation of the ban on their entry to the UK and to consider extending it to cover all known members of Westboro Baptist Church.

Rennie replied to the planned visit by Westboro Baptist Church by emphasising the welcoming character of Queen's Cross Church and Jesus, whilst also highlighting the dangers of fundamentalism:

"Everyone and anyone is welcome at Queen's Cross Church - that's the way Jesus was, and that's the way we are. If they don't want to join us in worship and choose to protest, then that will be up to them." Mr Rennie added: "I know a lot of people are concerned by their visit, but I am quite relaxed about it. "At the very least, it is a good reminder to us all of the dangers of fundamentalism, and the absurdity of where it can lead you. They happen to shout a lot, whereas others hold their hateful views more secretly." He continued: "Most Christians are neither homophobic nor extremist, but are moderate people who seek to share the love of God in the community in which they live."

Fred Phelps responded by condemning the Church of Scotland, Scott Rennie, the Government of the United Kingdom, and Mark McDonald in a YouTube broadcast. Following the restatement of the ban on the Phelps' entry to the United Kingdom, the Aberdeen National Front indicated their intention to protest against Rennie and Queen's Cross Church on Sunday 30 October.

In a rare interview on Radio Scotland's 'Sunday Morning with Ricky Ross', broadcast on 25 September 2011, Rennie discussed his faith and life. Commenting on the Scottish Government's marriage consultation, Rennie stated that 'marriage has always been an evolving institution'.

On Sunday 2 October 2011, the English Churchman distributed anti-gay leaflets to church attendees prior to the 10 am Sunday service and affixed a poster to the church notice board.

On Thursday 2 February 2012, The Scotsman newspaper reported that a motion had been lodged with the Presbytery of Aberdeen by Louis Kinsey of St Columba's Church, Aberdeen, in order to seek to prevent Queen's Cross Church from allowing Hindus to meet "every second Sunday afternoon" in their "congregational hall" due to their "sacrificial worship offered to idols and false deities...[which] contravenes the First and Second Commandments." Rennie responded: "They [the Hindus] are lovely people. They are part of our local community and they are welcome. We don’t have any problem with it at all. There is nothing innovative in what we are doing." The Presbytery of Aberdeen met on Tuesday 7 February 2012 and heard Kinsey's motion in private. The motion was defeated and the Presbytery of Aberdeen stated: "On a vote being taken, the motion was narrowly defeated but it was recognised by many speakers that, despite their diversity, all views were sincerely held." The matter was raised and defeated at General Assembly 2012 by Ian Watson, who, following Queen's Cross Church and Scott Rennie's hosting of a local Hindu Association, sought for the General Assembly to ban worship on Christian premises of non-Christian faiths. However, Watson's position did not find majority support.

On Saturday 28 July 2012, The Scotsman reported comments by Rennie, made in response to the Scottish Government's marriage consultation:

“I believe that love shared and celebrated in society, between two people of the same sex, should make no-one afraid and can only enrich the communities in which we live. This legislation will provide both civil and religious marriage for those who wish to celebrate it and a respectful space of objection for those who do not. Faith groups and the churches will be free to come to their own conclusions in their own time.”

On Monday 20 May 2013, the Church of Scotland's General Assembly voted to provide Kirk Sessions with the authority to select LGB ministers. Speaking the following day on BBC Radio Scotland’s Good Morning Scotland breakfast programme, Rennie welcomed this decision:

“There is no doubt that it [the vote] is a milestone, because it is at last a recognition of the place of gay and lesbian people in the ministry, of which there are a number. It also recognises liberty of conscience on this matter, as there is on many other matters, within the broad church that is the national church...There is no doubt, an important step has been taken yesterday.

The interview revealed aspects of Rennie's progressive Christian theology, as he rejected the charge that the General Assembly's decision represented a move to remain aligned with societal social mores:

"I think the church always has to try and figure out its faith in the context in which it lives, and obviously our understanding of sexuality, of gender, as with many other things in life, has changed - and is forever changing. But I wouldn’t want to characterise this as a move to somehow just go along with society. I think for those of us who believe in inclusion, that comes from a point of view that we really believe that Jesus was for inclusion; we believe that God is for inclusion; and we believe in a God of love. And that’s fundamental to our faith and our understanding."

Following a vote by all Presbyteries of the Church of Scotland in favour of allowing the ordination of Ministers in civil partnerships on 8 January 2015, Rennie commented on BBC Radio Scotland's Good Morning Scotland that the vote was: "a very positive vote for the Kirk and for Scotland".

On 20 January 2015, Rennie gave the Time for Reflection for Members of the Scottish Parliament (MSPs) at the Scottish Parliament in Edinburgh. He discussed Robert Burns and human nature.

Rennie and his partner converted their civil partnership into a same-sex marriage in December 2014, shortly after its introduction in Scotland.

At the Church of Scotland General Assembly on Saturday 16 May 2015, six years after the Aberdeen (Rennie) case was heard, the Church of Scotland voted to allow congregations to choose ministers in civil partnerships. Commenting on this, Rennie said that it was a "great outcome for an open, broad and faithful Church of Scotland."

In summer 2015, Rennie participated in a 'pulpit exchange' with Louise Westfall, Senior Pastor of Central Presbyterian Church (Denver, Colorado). Rennie preached a four-week series entitled 'A Disturbing God'.

Rennie stepped down as minister for Queen's Cross Church in 2022, having given his last sermon on Easter Sunday (17 April 2022).

== Subsequent Ministry ==
Rennie was inducted to Crown Court Church in London on 5 May 2022.

On 16 February 2025, he preached as Sole Nominee to the charge of St Giles' Cathedral in Edinburgh. He was duly elected, and serves (as of October 2025) as the Minister.

== See also ==
- Fellowship of Confessing Churches
