= Presbytery of Aberdeen =

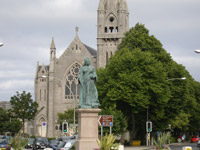
Queen's Cross Church

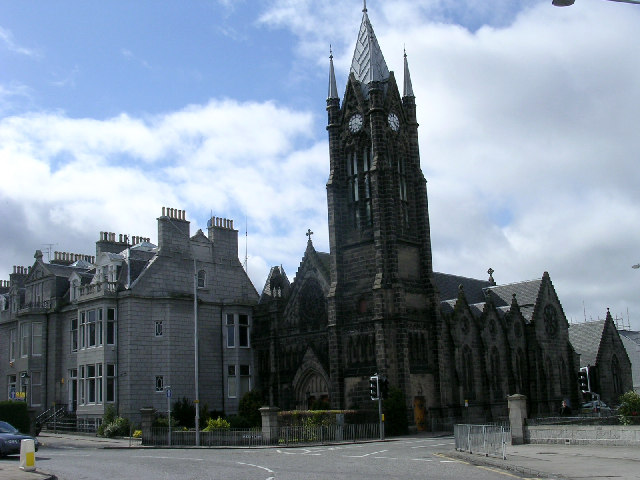
Rubislaw Church

The Presbytery of the North East and Northern Isles is one of the fourteen presbyteries of the Church of Scotland, being the local presbytery for the city of Aberdeen. The current moderator is the Rev Hutton Steel who is minister of High Hilton Parish Church. The presbytery represents and supervises thirty six Church of Scotland congregations within the city. The office is at Mastrick Parish Church.

The role of Presbytery Clerk is held by the Rev Dr John A Ferguson. On 1 June 2020 the presbytery merged with Shetland Presbytery becoming the Presbytery of Aberdeen and Shetland with Shetland reducing its parishes to one, covering all the islands. There is currently a consultation process with a view to further mergers in the North East of Scotland. This forms part of the Church of Scotland's wider aim of reducing the number of presbyteries to around 12.This has now taken place and the presbytery is now called the Presbytery of the North East and Northern Isles.

== Parishes ==
Location	Dedication	Minister	Details
Bridge of Don: Oldmachar		Rev Darren Jalland	Sunday 10.30am
Bridge of Don: St Columba's	St Columba	Rev Louis Kinsey	Sunday 10.00am Sunday 6.00pm
Craigiebuckler		Rev Kenneth L. Petrie	Sunday 11am (September to June) Sunday 10am (July to August)
Ferryhill		Rev Peter Johnston	Sunday 10.00am (July to August) Sunday 11.00am (September to June) Sunday 6.00pm (third Sunday in January to May and September to October) Tuesday 12.10pm (15 minutes) (third Tuesday of month)
High Hilton		Rev Hutton Steel	Sunday 11.00am
High Kirk of St Machar (St Machar's Cathedral)	St Machar	Rev Sarah Brown	Sunday 11.00am Sunday 6.00pm
Holburn West		Rev Duncan C. Eddie	Sunday 11.00am
Mannofield		Rev Keith T. Blackwood	Sunday 9.30am Sunday 11.00am Sunday 6.30pm Wednesday 8.00pm
Mastrick		Vacant	Sunday 11.00am
Middlefield		Under the care of Presbytery	Sunday 11.00am
Midstocket (Union of the former St Ninian's and Beechgrove Churches)		Vacant	Sunday 10.30am
Stockethill		Rev Ian M. Aitken	Woodhill Court: Sunday 10.00am (first Sunday of the month only) Cairncry Community Centre: Sunday 10.30am
Northfield		Rev Scott C. Guy	Sunday 10.30am
Queen's Cross		Rev Scott Rennie	Sunday 10.30am Wednesday 1.15pm (September to June only)
Rubislaw		Rev Robert Smith	Sunday 9.30am (March to May and September to November) Sunday 11am (March to May and September to November) Sunday 10.00am (June to August) Sunday 11am (December to February)
'Ruthrieston West		Rev Benjamin D.W. Byun	Sunday 10.00am
South Holburn (merger of Holburn Central and Ruthrieston South)		Rev David Stewart	Sunday 10.30am
St George's Tillydrone	St George	Vacant	11.15am
St John's for Deaf People	St John	Rev Mary Whittaker	Sunday 11.00am (first, third and fifth Sunday of the month only)
St Mark's	St Mark		Sunday 10am (July and August) Sunday 11am (September to June)
St Mary's	St Mary	Rev Elsie J. Fortune	Sunday 11.00am
St Nicholas' Uniting Kirk	St Nicholas	Rev Stephen Taylor	Sunday 9.30am (June to September) Sunday 11.00am
St Nicholas' Kincorth South	St Nicholas	Rev Edward C. McKenna	Sunday 10.00am Sunday 6.30pm
St Stephen's	St Stephen	Rev Maggie Whyte	Sunday 11.00a Sunday 7.30pm (September to June only)
Summerhill		Rev Michael Shewen	Sunday 11.00am
Torry St Fittick's	St Fittick	Rev Dr Edmond Gatima	Sunday 9.30am (June to August only) Sunday 11.00am
Woodside		Rev Markus Aufferman	Sunday 11.00am

=== Outlying parishes ===
Location	Dedication	Minister	Details
Brimmond Parish Church		Rev Jonny Clipston Sunday 11.00am	
Cults		Rev Shuna Dicks	Sunday 10.30am
Dyce		In Vacancy - Rev Joan Thorne - OLM	Sunday 10.30am (Every Sunday apart from 2nd Sunday of the Month - the service is at Newmachar Church)
Peterculter		Rev John A. Ferguson	Sunday 10.30am

== See also ==
- List of Church of Scotland parishes
- List of Church of Scotland synods and presbyteries
- Presbytery of Europe
- Presbytery of Glasgow
