= Ewan Aitken =

British politician (born 1962)

Ewan Aitken (born 1962 in Paisley) was a minister of the Church of Scotland. In May 2014 he became the chief executive officer of Cyrenians. Previously, he was the Secretary of the Church of Scotland's Church and Society Council between 2008 and 2014. He is a member of the Iona Community and the Christians on the Left.

== Education ==
After attending Woodmill High School in Dunfermline, he studied Social Anthropology at the University of Sussex where he graduated BA (Hons) in 1985. In 1990, he graduated BD (Hons) with a degree in Divinity at the University of Edinburgh.

== Ministry ==
In 1992 he was ordained as a minister of the Church of Scotland. He became assistant minister at South Leith Parish Church followed by a year as locum minister at St Andrew's Church in Gisborne, New Zealand. He then served from 1995 until 2002 as the minister of St Margaret's Parish Church in Restalrig, Edinburgh. He worked at the Church of Scotland Offices in Edinburgh as Secretary of the Church and Society Council from 2008 until 2014.

== Politics ==
Aitken was elected as a Labour councillor to the Edinburgh City Council in 1999. He served on the education and social justice committees. From 2002 he served full-time as a Councillor, including as the City Council's Executive member for education. From 2003 to 2006 he was COSLA's education spokesman. In 2006 Aitken became Leader of the Edinburgh City Council.

Following the 2007 local elections, the Scottish Liberal Democrat and Scottish National Party groups agreed to form a coalition. Aitken continued to be the leader of the Labour opposition group until he resigned from this position in 2008 to take up the position of Secretary to the Church of Scotland's Church and Society Council. He did not seek re-election to the City Council at the local government elections in 2012.

In 2011, Aitken contested the Scottish Parliamentary constituency of Edinburgh Eastern against the SNP's Kenny MacAskill.

Civic offices
| Preceded by Donald Anderson | Leader of Edinburgh City Council; 2006 – 2007 | Succeeded by Jenny Dawe |
