= Fellowship of Confessing Churches =

The Fellowship of Confessing Churches is a fellowship of congregations of the Church of Scotland that was formed in April 2009 in response to the decision of the General Assembly to uphold the ordination of Scott Rennie, a minister who was in a homosexual relationship. The group has declared their rejection of what they deem to be "new teachings and practices which depart from the historic Christian faith, turn away from the orthodox gospel of repentance and faith, and publicly sanctify what the Bible proclaims as sin".

The Fellowship of Confessing Churches has identified the following as "Related Sites and Organizations" :

- "Forward Together (Scotland)"
- "Confessing Churches in Presbyterian Church of the USA" (which is formally known as "The Presbyterian Lay Committee")
- "Fellowship of Confessing Anglicans"

In May 2011 it was reported that 62 churches had joined the Fellowship.

== See also ==
- Church of Scotland
- Confessing Movement
