= Fraser McLuskey =

Scottish clergyman & military chaplain (1914-2005)

The Very Reverend Fraser McLuskey MC
- Moderator of the General Assembly
- Church: Church of Scotland
- In office: 1983 to 1984
- Predecessor: John McIntyre
- Successor: John M. K. Paterson
- Other post: Minister of St Columba's Church, London (1960–1986)

Orders
- Ordination: 1938

Personal details
- Born: James Fraser McLuskey; 19 September 1914 Edinburgh, Scotland
- Died: 24 July 2005 (aged 90) Edinburgh, Scotland
- Denomination: Presbyterianism
- Military career
- Allegiance: United Kingdom
- Branch: British Army
- Service years: 1943–1946
- Rank: Chaplain
- Unit: Special Air Service
- Conflicts: World War II
- Awards: Military Cross

James Fraser McLuskey, MC (19 September 1914 – 24 July 2005) was a British Church of Scotland minister, who served as a military chaplain with the Special Air Service during World War II. He later went on to become the minister of St Columba's, the larger of the Church of Scotland's two congregations in London. He also served as Moderator of the General Assembly from 1983 to 1984.

== Early life ==
McLuskey was born in Edinburgh on 19 September 1914 but his family moved to Aberdeen where his father ran a laundry business. He attended Aberdeen Grammar School from 1920 to 1931 and returned to Edinburgh to take degrees in arts and divinity. Fraser McLuskey, as he was known, spent several months on a travel scholarship where he became interested in the Confessional Church in Germany, which was made up of those opposed to Adolf Hitler and to Nazi attempts to exercise control over the Protestant churches. Here he met his future wife, Irene Calaminus, the daughter of a pastor in the Confessional Church.

== World War II ==
In 1939 McLuskey succeeded Dr Archie Craig as chaplain to the University of Glasgow. In 1942 he took leave of absence to become an Army chaplain, and after parachute training he was posted to the Special Air Service, with whom he served in France, Germany and Norway. He was awarded the Military Cross.

He was chaplain to the 1st SAS regiment, and was dropped into occupied France by parachute to an area between Nevers and Dijon. He landed in a tree, upside down, and after cutting himself free managed to join up with the soldiers from whom he had become separated. Equipped with a Renault car and personal bodyguard Harry Wilson he ministered to the disparate groups of SAS men. He wrote about his experiences in the book 'Parachute Padre'.

== Aftermath ==
After returning to Britain Fraser McLuskey travelled throughout the country visiting the families of men killed in action with the SAS to explain the circumstances of their death. From 1947 to 1950, Fraser was sub-warden at the Royal Army Chaplains' Training Centre. He then returned to Scotland, first to the parish of Broughty Ferry East and then, in 1955 to New Kilpatrick on the outskirts of Glasgow, which had a congregation of more than 2,000, one of the largest in the Church of Scotland. It was while Fraser McLuskey was there that his wife Irene died of breast cancer, leaving McLuskey to look after their two teenage sons.

== Later life ==
Shortly afterwards, he moved to St Columba's Church, London. He was a strong believer in having Church of Scotland outposts in London. Mcluskey united St Columba's with another outpost of the kirk in Dulwich, and also linked with the congregation of St Andrew's, Newcastle upon Tyne. He retired in 1986 to Edinburgh, where he became a member of a group of current and retired ministers who supported the Conservative Party and opposed the left-wing stance of the Church of Scotland during the time of Margaret Thatcher. He spent much of his free time travelling the countryside where he went with the Special Air Service in World War II.

== Controversy ==
In 1966 McLuskey was landed in controversy when he planned to marry a widow, Ruth Briant, who before her marriage to Colonel Keith Briant, had been divorced. Believing that his marriage to a divorcee meant the end of his ministry, he decided to resign his charge. However he was persuaded by many to withdraw his letter of resignation and remained married to Ruth Briant till the end of his life.

== Death ==
Fraser McLuskey died in Edinburgh on 24 July 2005.

== See also ==
- List of moderators of the General Assembly of the Church of Scotland
