= Forward Together =

Forward Together may refer to:

- Forward Together PAC, a political action committee
- Forward Together (Scotland), an evangelical organisation
- Forward Together (Vancouver), a non-profit advocacy organization
- "Forward, Together", an episode of Young Rock
- Operation Together Forward, also known as Forward Together, a military operation of the Iraq War

== See also ==
- Onward Together, a political action organization established by Hillary Clinton
