= Church and Society Council =

Former agency of the General Assembly of the Church of Scotland

The Church and Society Council was a former agency of the General Assembly of the Church of Scotland, which was tasked with facilitating the Church's engagement with, and comment upon, national, political and social issues. It was merged with the World Mission Council on 1 January 2020, as to create the Faith Impact Forum, as part of a wide ranging reform of General Assembly bodies agreed at the General Assembly of 2019.

== Role ==
The council's remit was to:

- developing theological, ethical and spiritual perspectives on issues;
- representing the Church in offering on its behalf appropriate and informed comment on political and social issues;
- building, establishing and maintaining networks and relationships with leaders in society, and engaging in long-term dialogue with them;
- supporting local congregations by offering resources on contemporary issues;
- conducting of an annual review of progress and reporting to the Council of Assembly.

== Membership ==
The council was formed on 1 June 2005. Its conveners were

- Rev Ian Galloway, minister of Gorbals Parish Church, Glasgow (2008-2012);
- Mrs Morag Mylne (2005-2008), an advocate and elder of the church, based in Edinburgh;
- Rev Sally Foster Fulton (2012-2016);
- Rev Dr Richard Frazer (2016-2019), minister of Greyfriars Church, Edinburgh.

The Council Secretary (from 2015) was the Rev Dr Martin Johnstone. He succeeded the Rev Ewan Aitken (who served 2008–2014). Mr Aitken was formerly minister at St Margaret's Parish Church in Restalrig, Edinburgh; he is also an Edinburgh city councillor and was Labour Party group leader on the City of Edinburgh Council. The Council Secretary prior to Ewan Aitken was the Rev Dr David Sinclair, who left in May 2008 to become minister at Wellington Church, Glasgow.

== History ==
The Church and Society Council was the successor to the former Committees on Church and Nation, Education, the Scottish Churches Parliamentary Office, the Society, Religion and Technology Project and the social interests remit of the former Board of Social Responsibility. The Education Committee, SRT Project and the Parliamentary Office continue to exist under the umbrella of the council.

The Church and Nation Committee was founded in 1919. In its early days, the Committee promoted an anti-Roman Catholic agenda. Under the leadership of the Rev John White in 1923, the Committee published a highly-controversial (and since-repudiated) report entitled "The Menace of the Irish Race to our Scottish Nationality." The report accused Roman Catholics of Irish birth or descent of being part of a conspiracy to subvert Presbyterian values and of being the principal cause of drunkenness, crime and financial imprudence.

In 2002, however, the General Assembly passed a resolution that "regrets any part played in sectarianism by our church in the past and affirm our support for future moves towards a more tolerant society". The Assembly also received a report from the Church and Nation Committee entitled "The Demon in our Society: Sectarianism in Scotland." The Convener of the Church and Nation Committee in 2002 was the Rev. Alan McDonald, who became Moderator in 2006.

The Church and Nation Committee had one of the highest profiles in the Church of Scotland. It took a lead in campaigns, such as opposing nuclear weapons and promoting devolution for Scotland. It also led the Church's response to climate change, with its final act being to call on the Church of Scotland to disinvest from fossil fuel companies.

== See also ==
- Scottish Churches Parliamentary Office
