= John White (minister) =

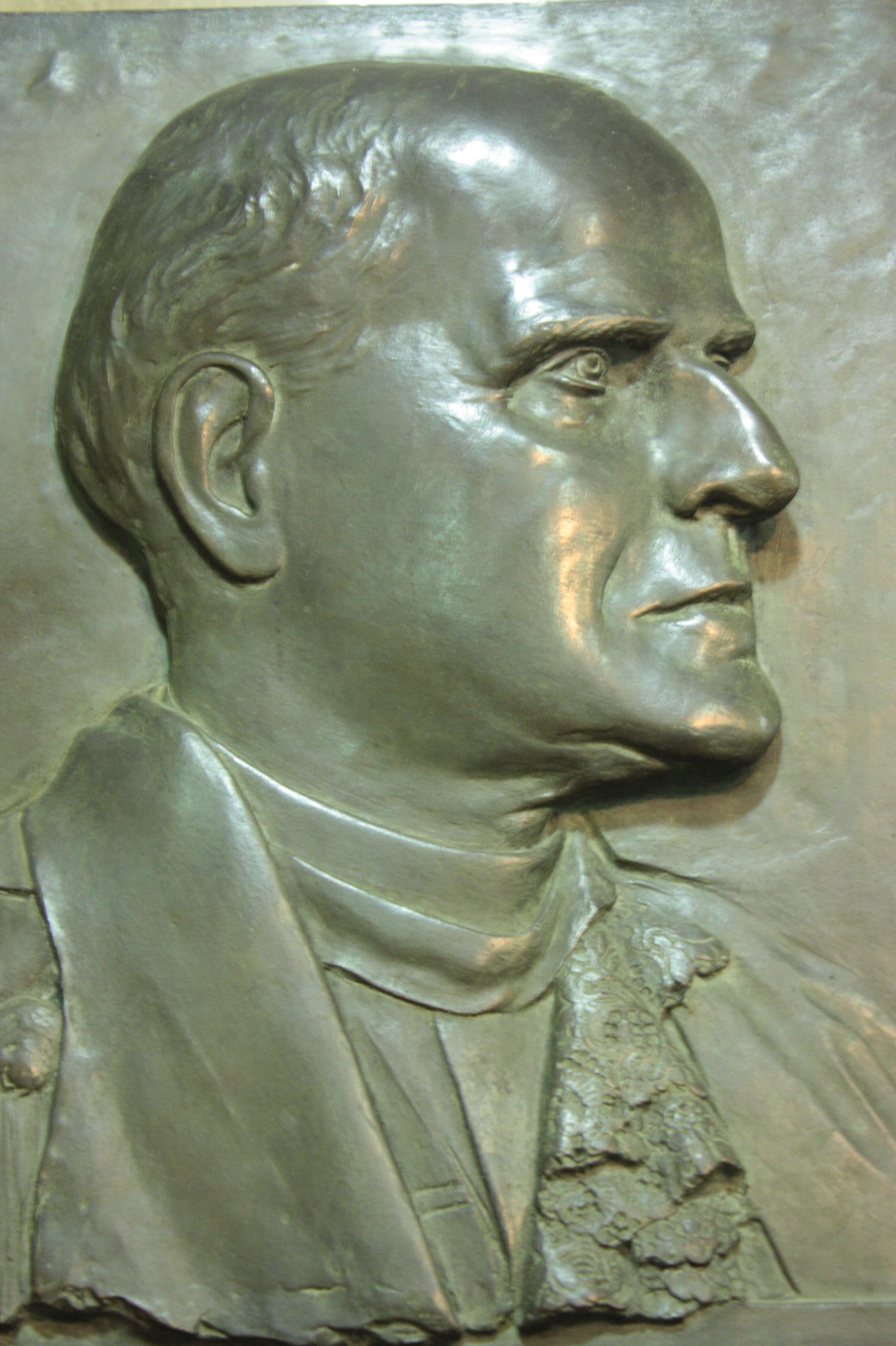
Plaque to Rev Dr John White, South Leith Parish Church

John White CH (1867–1951) was a minister of the Church of Scotland. He served as Moderator of the General Assembly of the Church of Scotland in 1925 and again at the reunion Assembly of 1929. White was one of the most influential figures in the Church of Scotland during the early decades of the 20th century, though his influence waned later in his life and he appeared increasingly isolated and anachronistic.

== Background and career ==
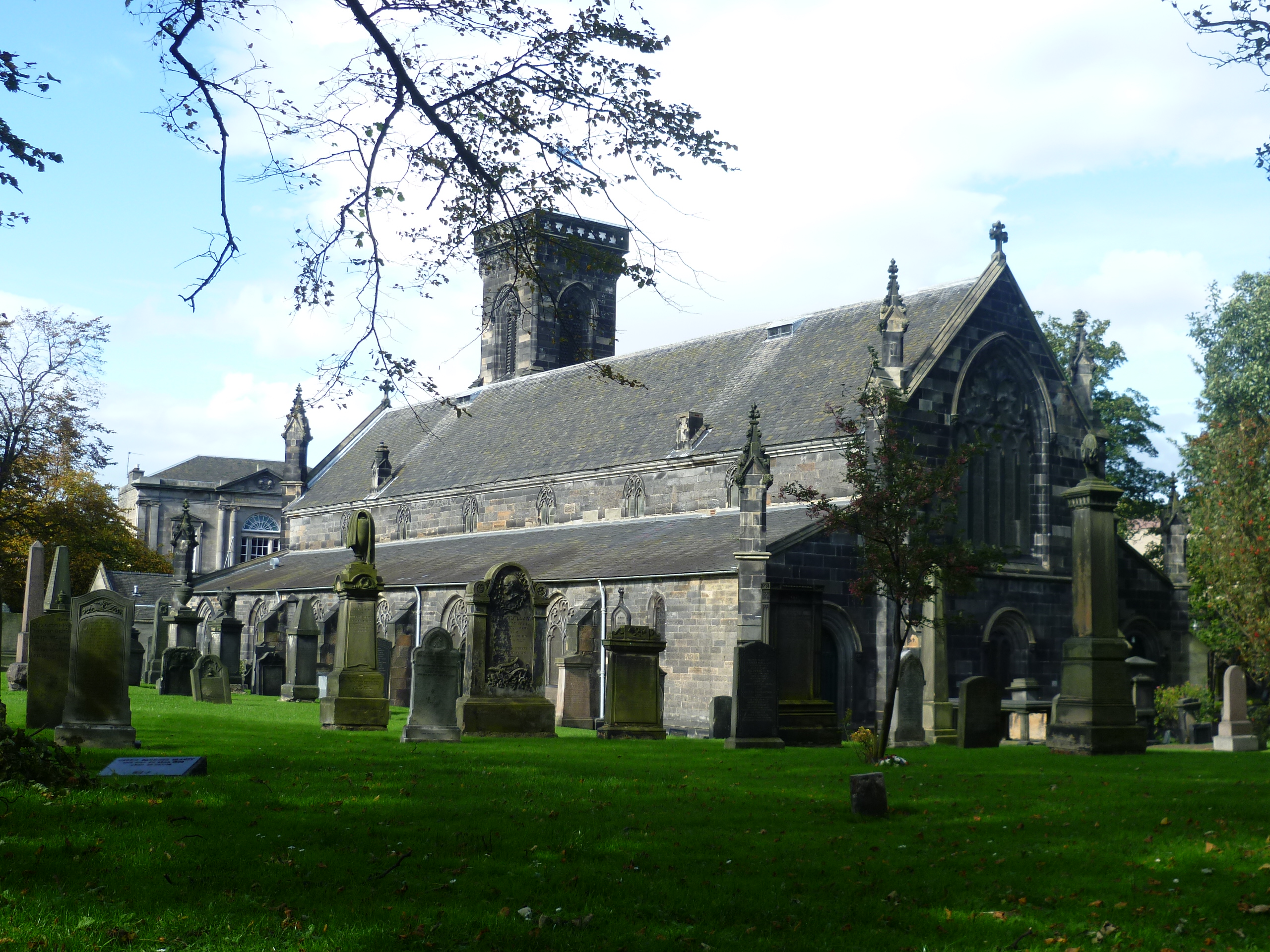
South Leith Parish Church from Constitution Street

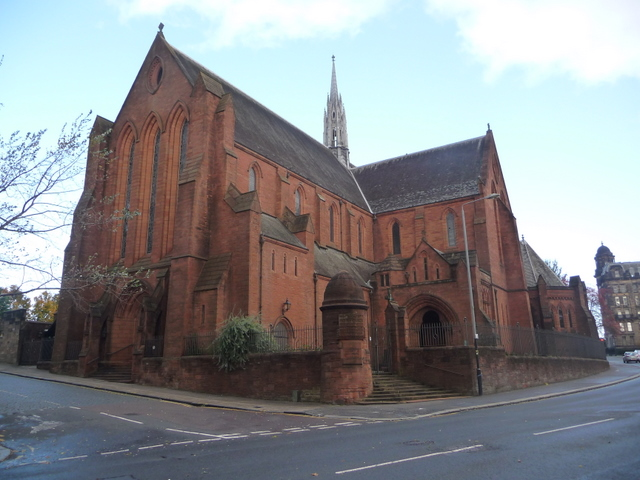
Barony Parish Church

He was born in Kilwinning, Ayrshire, the son of a flour miller. After studies at the University of Glasgow, he was inducted as minister at Shettleston, Glasgow in 1893. In 1904 he moved to South Leith Parish Church. In 1911 he moved back to Glasgow, becoming minister of the Barony Church, where he remained until his retirement in 1934, being replaced by Rev Robert Scott. He also served as a chaplain in the British Army during World War I.

The high point of his ministry was his nomination to be Moderator of the General Assembly of the Church of Scotland in October 1925. This special Assembly took place in the Industrial Halls (now a bus garage), Annandale Street, Edinburgh to mark the reunion of the Church of Scotland and the United Free Church of Scotland - the Industrial Halls was the only suitable venue in the city large enough to accommodate the special Assembly.

His position as Moderator was succeeded in 1926 by Rev John Donaldson McCallum of Larkhall.

== Influence ==
White was highly influential in three areas. The first of these was the move to unite the Church of Scotland and the United Free Church of Scotland. Following protracted discussions which started in 1909, the reunion eventually took place on 2 October 1929. The second was his role as Convener of the Church and Nation Committee of the Church of Scotland during the 1920s; he was instrumental in drawing up a controversial report entitled The Menace of the Irish Race to our Scottish Nationality, which was received by the General Assembly in 1923 (see below). The third was his promotion of the Church Extension Scheme – which from 1932 onwards aimed to build new church buildings in new housing estates in Scotland’s cities.

White was the original recipient of a pipe tobacco blend that would later become known as Presbyterian Mixture. The blend was created especially for him before the First World War. He later introduced it to Stanley Baldwin, who reportedly enjoyed the mixture so much that he arranged for regular shipments and suggested the name Presbyterian Mixture himself.

== Controversy ==
White was a controversial figure – a staunch Tory and opponent of socialism and pacificism. His socially conservative stance was increasingly challenged during the 1930s by more liberal ministers, such as John Baillie. Since his death, White has been extensively criticised for his anti-Catholic stance, often denounced as sectarianism.

The 1923 report The Menace of the Irish Race to our Scottish Nationality (produced during White's Convenership of the Church and Nation Committee of the Church of Scotland) accused all members of the Catholic Church in Scotland of subverting Presbyterian values and of drunkenness, crime and financial imprudence. The report further called for the ending of immigration of Irish Catholics to Scotland and the deportation of any convicted of a criminal offence or living on state benefits. White urged a "racially pure" Scotland, declaring, "Today there is a movement throughout the world towards the rejection of non-native constituents and the crystallization of national life from native elements." Such attitudes started to wane considerably (both within the Church of Scotland as well as wider society) from the 1930s/40s onwards, especially given growing awareness of what was happening in eugenics-conscious Nazi Germany and of the perceived dangers of a national or folk church. Within the Church of Scotland, the repudiation of White's anti-Roman Catholic stance can be seen in the Baillie Report of 1942, the disassociation from the anti-papal sections of the Westminster Confession by the General Assembly in 1986 and ultimately the express repudiation of the 1923 report in 2002.

== Title ==
His full title (following his Moderatorial office) was the Very Reverend Dr John White CH DD LLD.

He was appointed a Member of the Order of the Companions of Honour in the 1935 Birthday Honours.

== See also ==
- List of moderators of the General Assembly of the Church of Scotland
