= St Columba's Church, Pont Street =

St Columba's Church
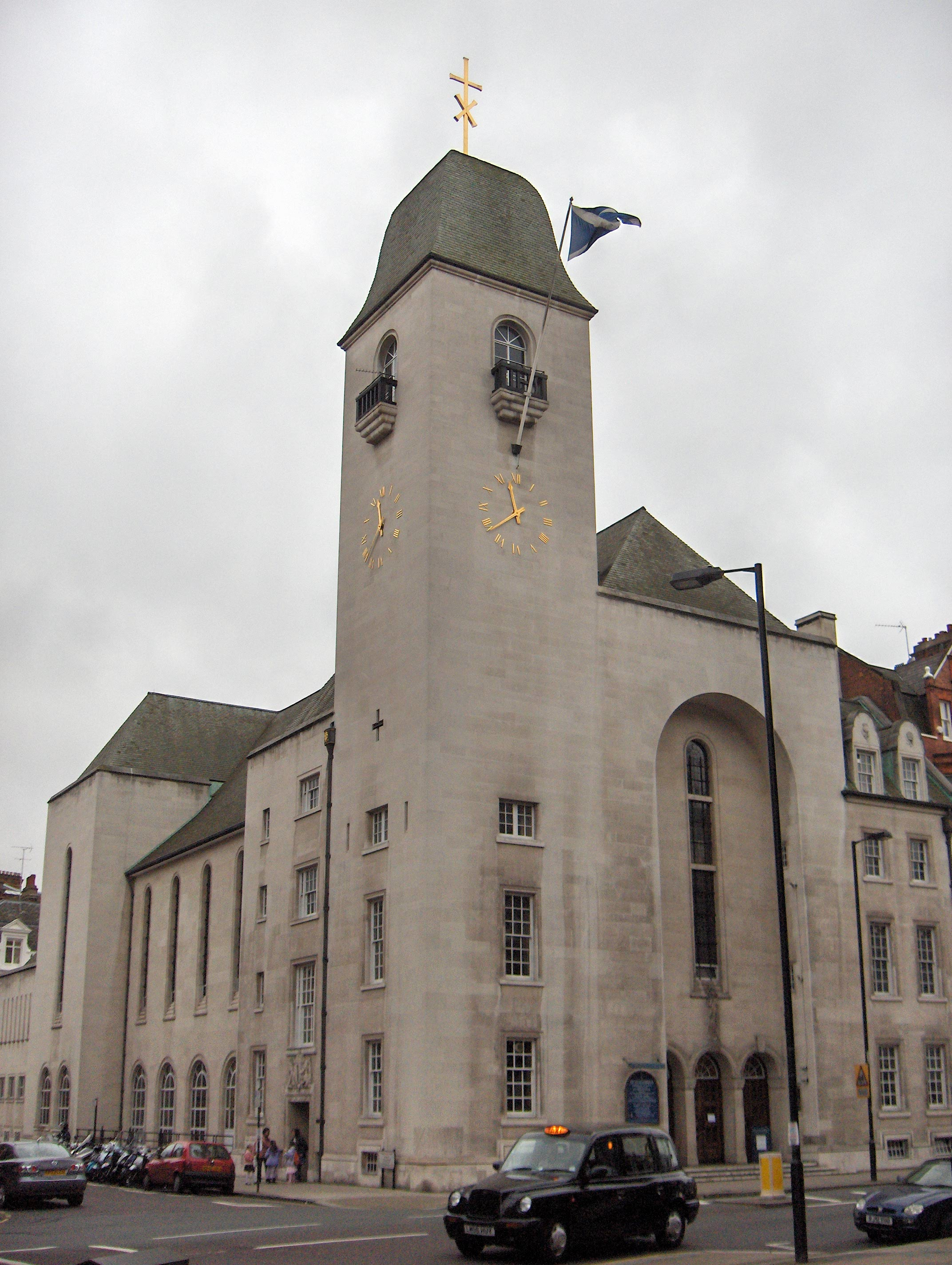
- St Columba's Church
- 51°29′48.4″N 0°9′48″W
- Location: Pont Street; Knightsbridge, London
- Country: England
- Denomination: Church of Scotland
- Website: www.stcolumbas.org.uk

History
- Status: Parish church

Architecture
- Functional status: Active
- Heritage designation: Grade II listed building
- Architect: Sir Edward Maufe
- Years built: 1884 (destroyed in the Blitz); Rebuilt 1955
- Groundbreaking: 6 July 1950 (new building)

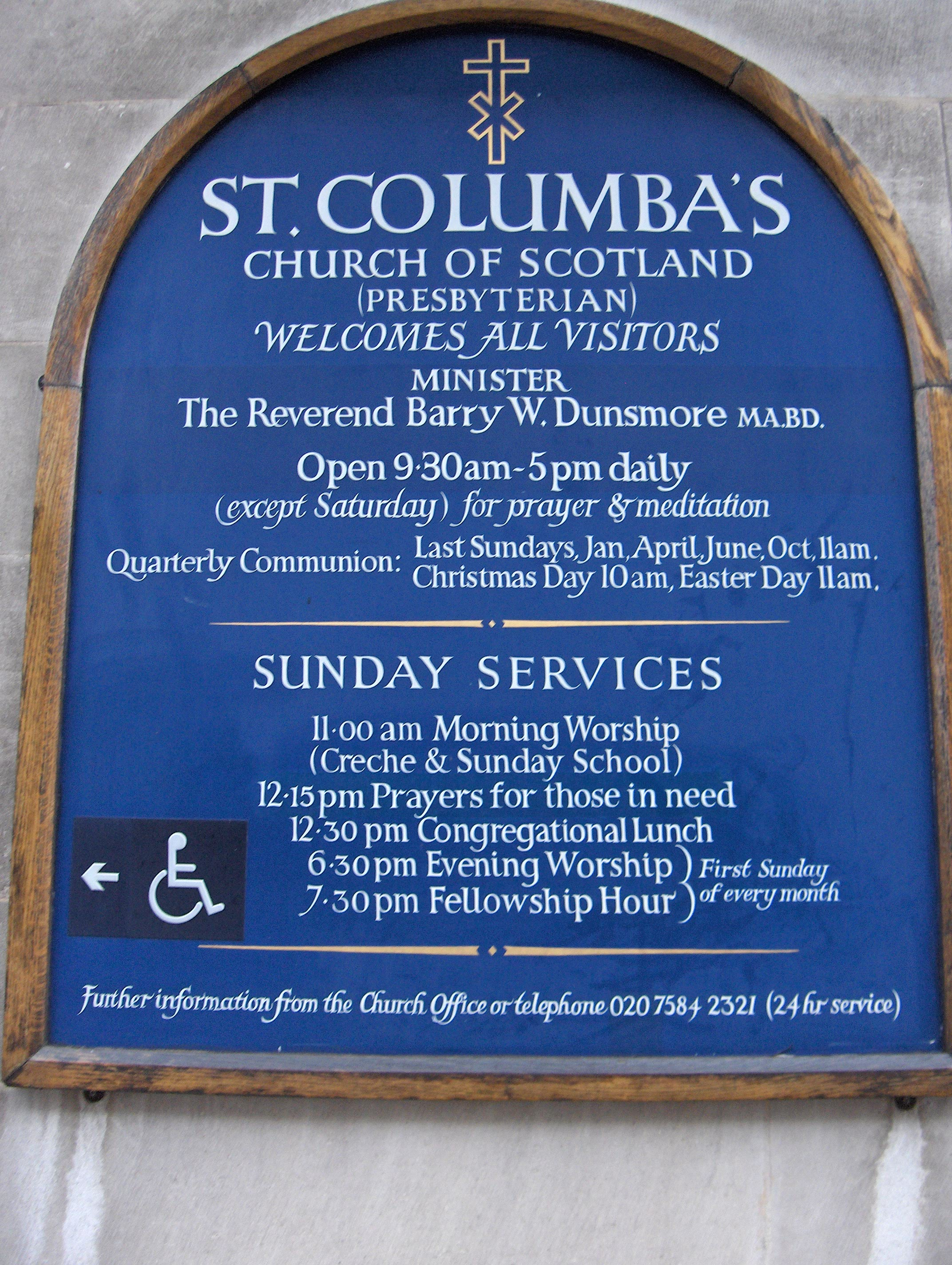
Church noticeboard

St Columba's Church is one of the two London congregations of the Church of Scotland. The church building, designed by Sir Edward Maufe, is located in Pont Street, Knightsbridge, near Harrods department store. It was given Grade II listing by English Heritage in 1988.

== History ==
The presence of Scottish Presbyterianism in London dates back to the Union of the Crowns in 1603. A congregation was established near what is now Trafalgar Square, with a permanent church later being built in Crown Court near Covent Garden. Crown Court Church is still in use, although rebuilt. The growth in the Scottish community in London resulted in the need for a larger church than Crown Court Church alone could accommodate. St Columba's Church (dedicated to the 6th-century Irish saint Columba, who is credited with spreading Christianity in Scotland) was therefore constructed, opening in 1884. However, this original building was destroyed by wartime bombing on the night of 10 May 1941. It was rebuilt on the same site in 1955 to a striking contemporary design by the architect Sir Edward Maufe, who also designed Guildford Cathedral.

The war memorial chapel was dedicated on 25 March 1956.

The dance society London Reels meets at St Columba's once a month from September to June to dance Highland Reels.

== Ministry ==
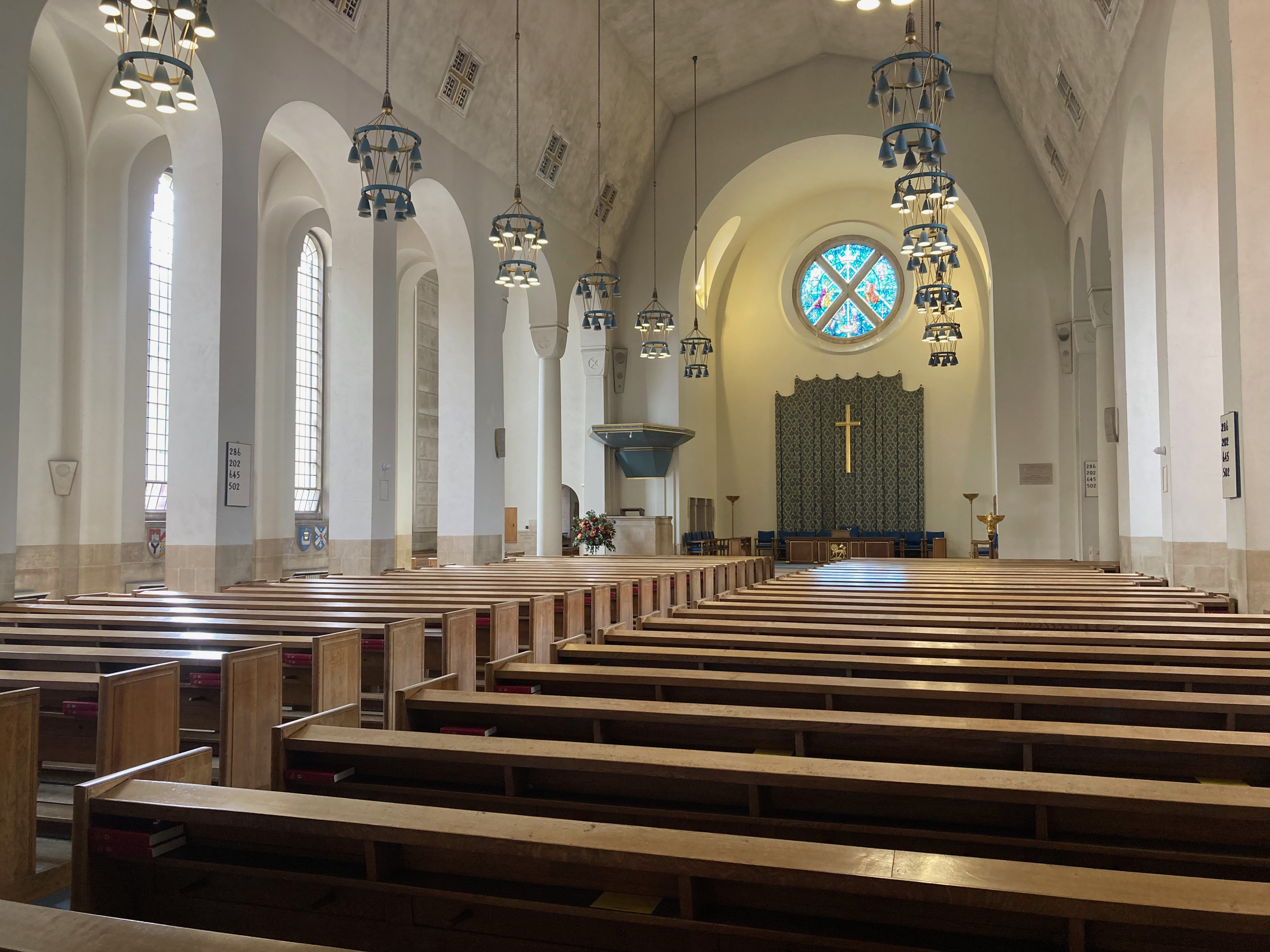
Interior view looking southwest

The current minister (as at April 2020) is the Rev C. Angus MacLeod, who was inducted to the charge by the Church of Scotland's Presbytery of England on 7 June 2012.

== Newcastle congregation ==
St Columba's Church is linked (i.e. shares a minister) with St Andrew's Church in Newcastle upon Tyne. This church is located at the junction of Sandyford Road and Grantham Road in Newcastle. The nearest Tyne and Wear Metro station is Jesmond.

== Moderators ==
There have been three Ministers of St Columba's who have held the office as Moderator of the General Assembly of the Church of Scotland:

- Very Rev. Robert F. V. Scott, 1956
- Very Rev. J. Fraser McLuskey, 1983
- Very Rev. John H. McIndoe, 1996

== See also ==
- Church of Scotland
- List of Church of Scotland parishes
- List of churches in London
- Nordic churches in London
- St Botolph's, Aldersgate (Free Church of Scotland in London)
