= Crown Court Church =

Church building in Westminster, London, England

Coordinates: 51°30′48″N 0°7′16″W

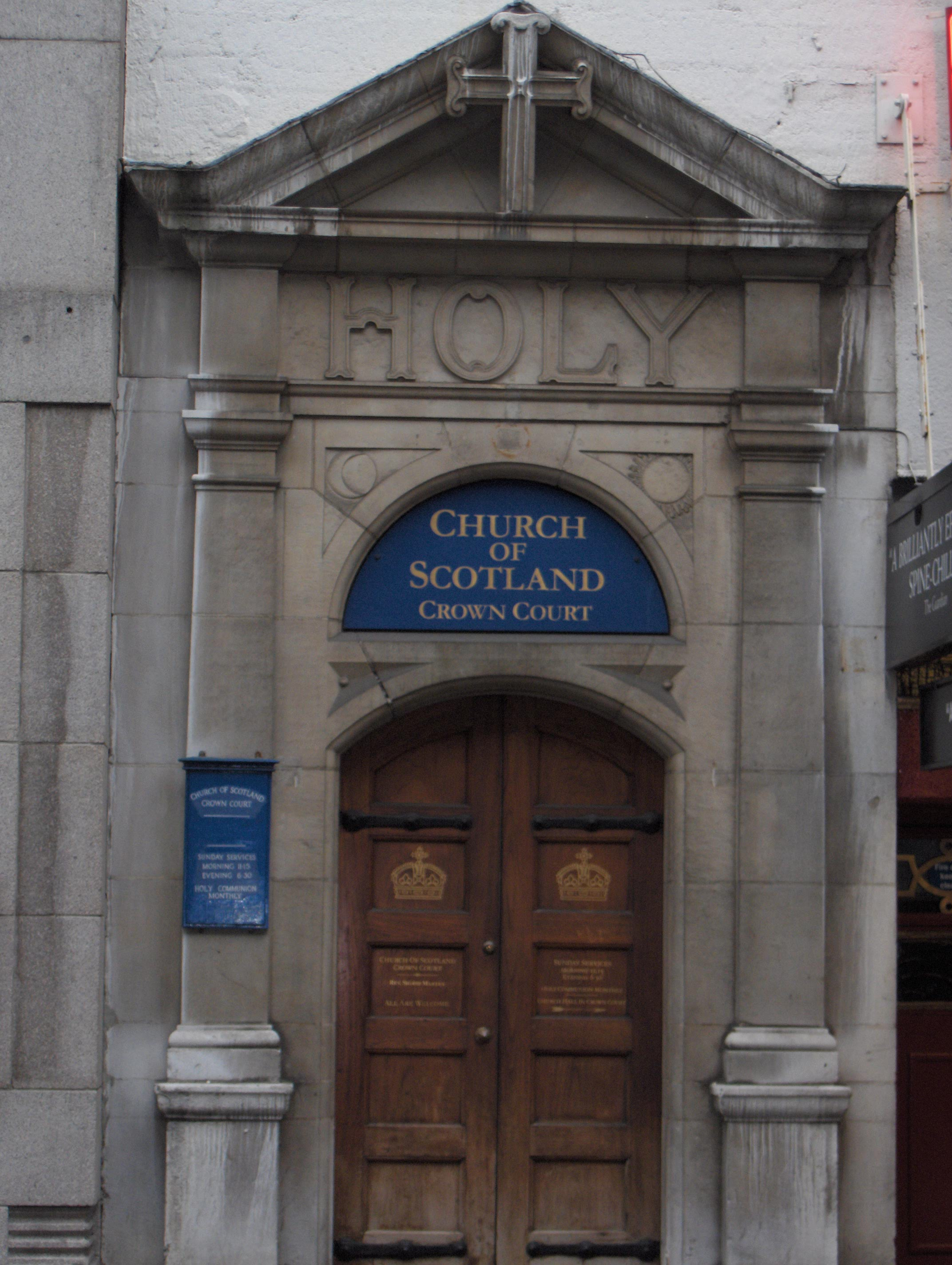
Main entrance, Russell Street

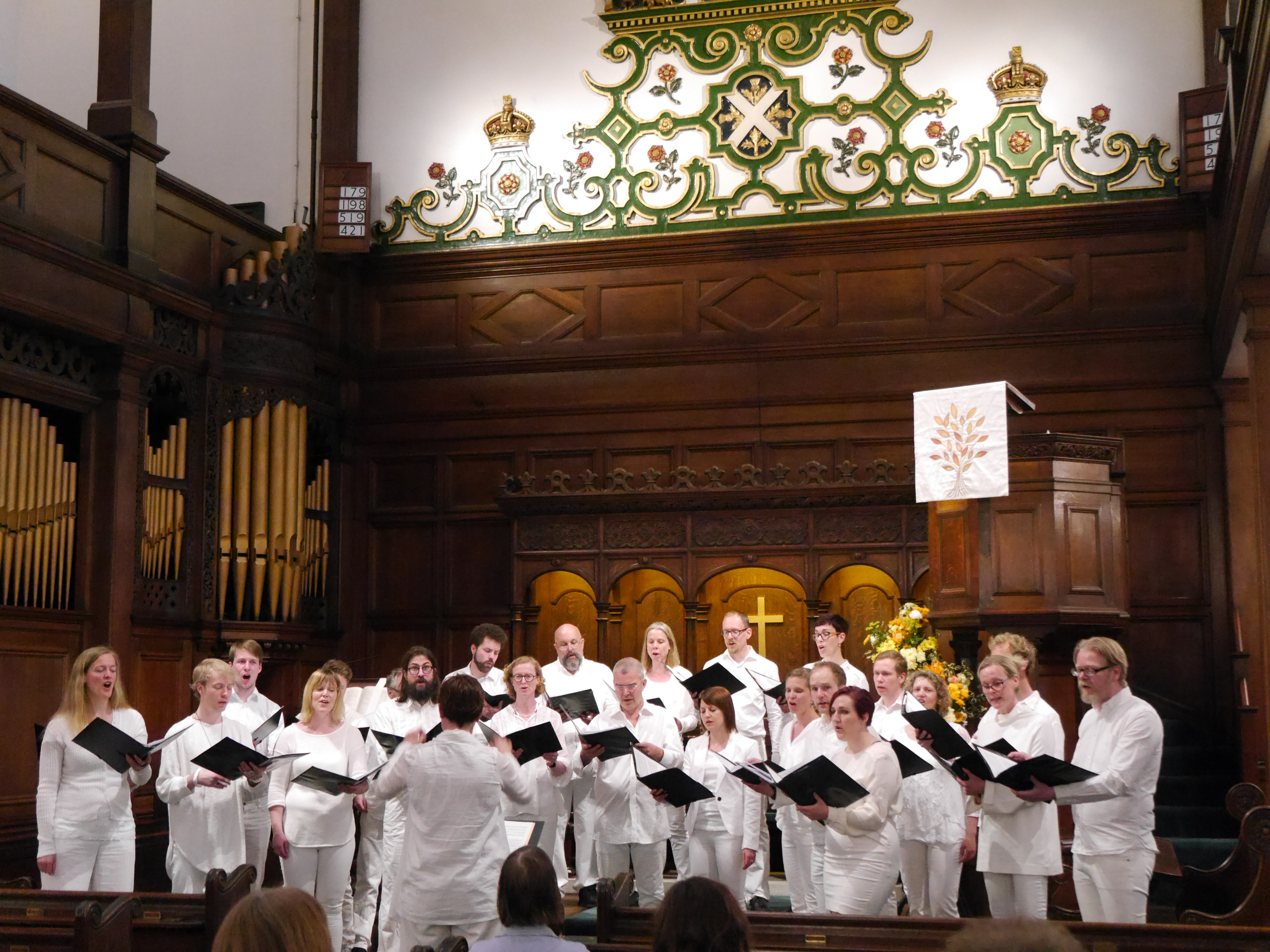
Haga Motettkör, Crown Court Church, 7 May 2016

Crown Court Church is a Church of Scotland church in Central London.

== History ==
A Scottish Presbyterian congregation was first established in London during the reign of King James VI and I, following the Union of the Crowns in 1603. Some of his Scottish courtiers worshipped in a chapel near the old Whitehall Palace at the diplomatic site as "Scotland Yard" and later provided the original headquarters of London's Metropolitan Police.

More tangible records date from 1711, when the Crown Court Church was established near Covent Garden. The church was extensively rebuilt in 1909, but remained on the same site. The exterior of the church is scarcely visible as it shares walls with neighbouring buildings, whilst the interior retains a 17th-century feel (despite the early 20th-century rebuilding work.) The church is named after a small courtyard adjacent to its location, but is also known as the "Kirk of the Crown of Scotland". The church building has been listed Grade II on the National Heritage List for England since December 1987.

Crown Court Church is the older of the two Church of Scotland congregations in London, the other being St Columba's in Knightsbridge. The church entrance is difficult to find, but is located in Russell Street, off Covent Garden, next to the Fortune Theatre and opposite the Theatre Royal.

== Present Day ==
The Reverend Scott Rennie has been Minister of Crown Court Church since 5 May 2022.

== See also ==
- St Columba's Church, London
- St. Paul's, Covent Garden (the local Church of England parish church)
- List of Church of Scotland parishes
- List of churches in London
- Nordic churches in London
