= Church of Scotland Act 1921 =

Act of the Parliament of the United Kingdom

Church of Scotland Act 1921 (Note: Section 4.)
- Act of Parliament
- Parliament of the United Kingdom
- Long title: An Act to declare the lawfulness of certain Articles declaratory of the Constitution of the Church of Scotland in matters spiritual prepared with the authority of the General Assembly of the Church.
- Citation: 11 & 12 Geo. 5. c. 29
- Territorial extent: United Kingdom

Dates
- Royal assent: 28 July 1921
- Commencement
Other legislation
Amended by	Statute Law Revision Act 1950

Status: Amended

Text of statute as originally enacted

Revised text of statute as amended

Text of the Church of Scotland Act 1921 as in force today (including any amendments) within the United Kingdom, from legislation.gov.uk.

The Church of Scotland Act 1921 (11 & 12 Geo. 5. c. 29) is an act of the Parliament of the United Kingdom. The purpose of the act was to settle centuries of dispute between the British Parliament and the Church of Scotland over the church's independence in spiritual matters. The passing of the act saw the British Parliament recognise the church's independence in spiritual matters, by giving legal recognition to the Articles Declaratory.

== Background ==
The Church of Scotland was founded as a Presbyterian church in 1560 during the Scottish Reformation since when it has held that the civil power had no authority over it, in spiritual matters. The question of church establishment and in what sense the Church of Scotland was an Established church led to conflicts with successive rulers from the Stuart monarchs onward. Monarchs tended to prefer the model of the Church of England, where the Crown had the power to appoint bishops, and various other forms of power over the Church (although it was not reduced to the complete state control found in Scandinavia).

The particular crisis came over the question of "lay patrons", who had the right to "present" (appoint) a minister. This was abolished in 1690 at the time of the Glorious Revolution but restored in 1712. In theory the congregation could accept or reject a candidate, but in practice this often meant little. By the late 18th century the church was divided into the Moderate and Evangelical parties. These differed especially on the question of lay patronage, which the Evangelicals rejected. Underlying this was the split between the Calvinism of the Evangelicals and the more Enlightenment tone of the Moderates.

In 1833 the General Assembly of the Church of Scotland passed a Veto Act giving congregations the clear power of veto. However the courts generally upheld the rights of lay patrons, and thus the issue became one of church and state. In 1843 a large part of the church seceded as the Free Church of Scotland — not rejecting Establishment in principle, but only its present form. This secession was known as the Disruption.

In the early 20th century a reunion between the Church of Scotland and the United Free Church seemed possible. To overcome problems (including legal problems which had followed the earlier merger of the Free Church and the United Presbyterian Church) the Church of Scotland Act 1921 (11 & 12 Geo. 5. c. 29) was passed. This noted that the General Assembly had passed Declaratory Articles. These were declared to be lawful (thus, they were not created by Parliament.) It was declared that "no limitation of the liberty, rights, and powers in matters spiritual therein set forth shall be derived from any statute or law affecting the Church of Scotland in matters spiritual at present in force; it being hereby declared that in all questions of construction the Declaratory Articles shall prevail..." (s. 1).

== Current position ==
This has created a new and revised relationship between the Church and the State. The Church of Scotland remains the National Church, but it has complete independence in spiritual questions and appointments. After the passing of the act, a church historian proclaimed: "No Church in Christendom can so fully claim to be at once national and free as the Church of Scotland today."

When legislating for Scotland since the passing of the act, the British Parliament has to consider whether the Church of Scotland is to be excluded from the provisions. Examples included the passing of the Scotland Act 1998, which had to be worded not to infringe on the independence of the Church, and prevent the Scottish Parliament repealing the Church of Scotland Act. Also during the passing of the Human Rights Act 1998, an amendment was proposed when the bill was passing through the House of Lords to exclude the Church of Scotland from some of the provisions. In the end, this was not deemed necessary.

In 2005, the House of Lords finally decided the case Percy (AP) v Church of Scotland Board of National Mission [2005] UKHL 73 , ruling that, despite the 1921 act, a ministerial appointment created a contract subject to the jurisdiction of the civil courts and employment tribunals.

== Subsequent developments ==
Section 4 of the act from " and shall come into operation " to the end of the section was repealed by section 1(1) of, and the first schedule to, the Statute Law Revision Act 1950 (14 Geo. 6. c. 6), which came into force on 23 May 1950.

== See also ==
- Religion in the United Kingdom
- Articles Declaratory
