= Queen's Cross Church, Aberdeen =

Coordinates: 57.143324°N 2.124664°W

Queen's Cross Church
- Fountainhall Church
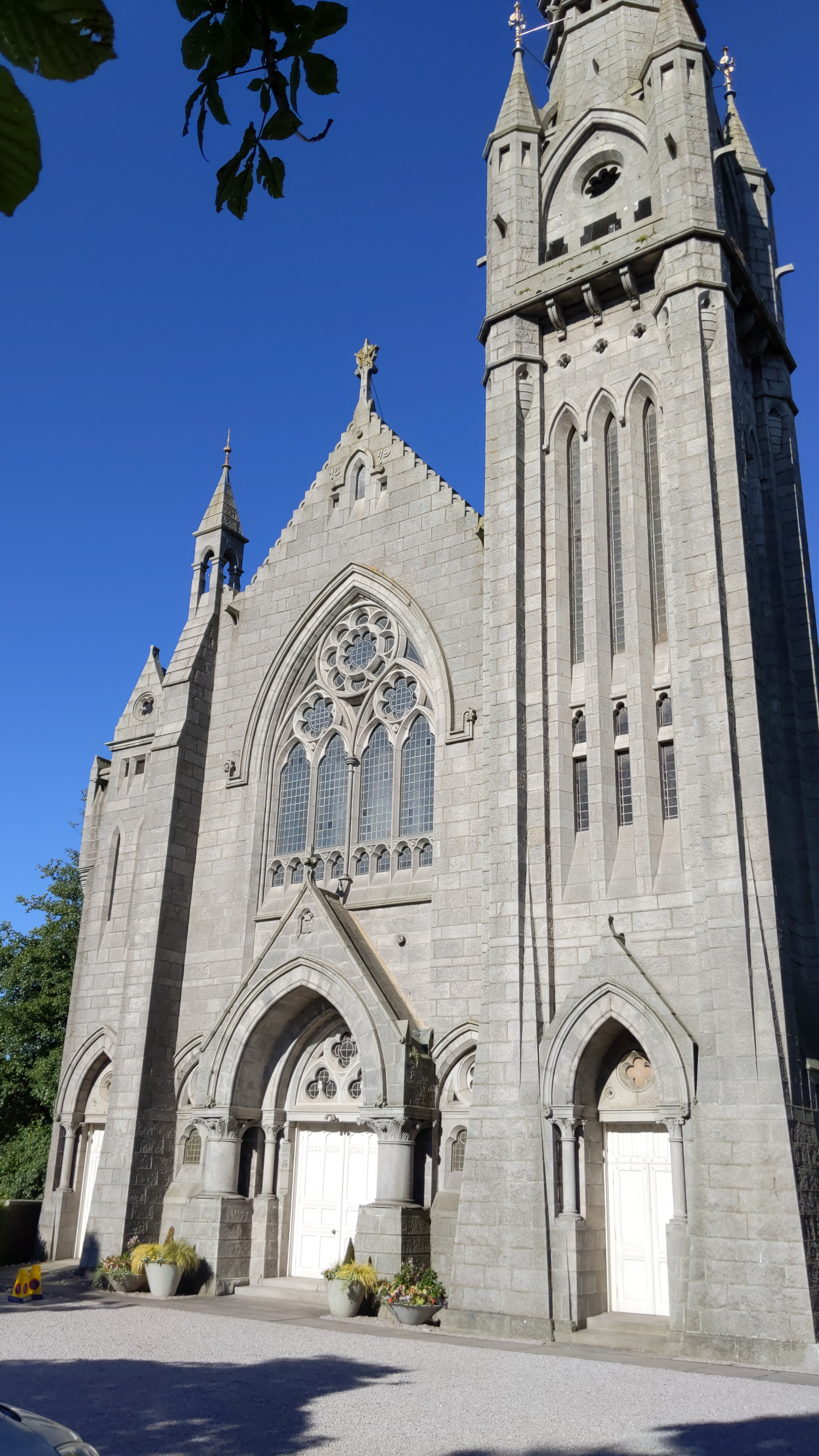
- Queen's Cross Church
- Queen's Cross Church
- Denomination: Church of Scotland
- Churchmanship: Reformed
- Website: Fountainhall Church

Administration
- Parish: Rubislaw

Listed Building – Category A
- Official name: Queen's Cross Church (Church of Scotland), including gatepiers and boundary walls
- Designated: 12 January 1967
- Reference no.: LB19948

Queen's Cross Church is a congregation of the Church of Scotland. It is located at the intersection of Carden Place and Albyn Place, at Queen's Cross in the heart of Aberdeen's west end business community. It is a short walk from the main shopping areas of the city and several main hotels. The Church united with the congregations of Midstocket Church, Holburn West Church and Rubislaw Church to form Fountainhall Church in June 2023. The church was designated as a Category B listed building in 1967 and was upgraded to Category A in 1984.

== History ==
The Revd Dr Edmund S. P. Jones was minister at Queen's Cross from 1965 until 1983. During his tenure the church experienced a period of significant change and growth: In 1975 the old church manse on Desswood Place was sold and a new manse was purchased nearby on St. Swithin Street; the church facilities were expanded with the construction of a nursery wing in 1971; and the church sanctuary was redesigned and redecorated by architect James Roy for its centenary in 1981.

When Dr Jones moved to America in November 1983 he was replaced at Queen's Cross by the Revd Bob Brown, who was minister from 1984 until his retirement in 2008.

The church was at the centre of an online protest from fellow Church of Scotland clergy when Revd Scott Rennie, an openly gay minister, was appointed in 2009. Upon hearing of Rennie's new position, the Westboro Baptist Church announced its intention to picket the church in protest. Pastor Fred Phelps and his daughter Shirley Phelps-Roper planned to travel to Scotland to begin their protest, however their entry to the country was blocked as the WBC had been banned from coming into the country since 2009.

== See also ==
- List of Church of Scotland parishes
