= Articles Declaratory of the Constitution of the Church of Scotland =

The Articles Declaratory of the Constitution of the Church of Scotland – often known as the Declaratory Articles - were drawn up early in the 20th century to facilitate the union of the Church of Scotland and the United Free Church of Scotland. The "declaratory" nature of the Articles means that they are intended to define or "declare" a status that already existed, but explicitly spelt out for the avoidance of doubt. By an Act of Parliament – The Church of Scotland Act 1921 – the Articles Declaratory were held to be lawful, thus recognising the Church of Scotland as the national church in Scotland but independent from the state in matters spiritual. They are still in force. Special procedures are required to amend the Articles Declaratory (see Article VIII), but Article I cannot be altered.

== See also ==
- Separation of church and state
