= Robert Scott (moderator) =

Scottish minister and religious author

Robert Forrester Victor Scott (1897–1975) was a Scottish minister and religious author who served as Moderator of the General Assembly of the Church of Scotland in 1956. He is sometimes referred to as Robin Scott.

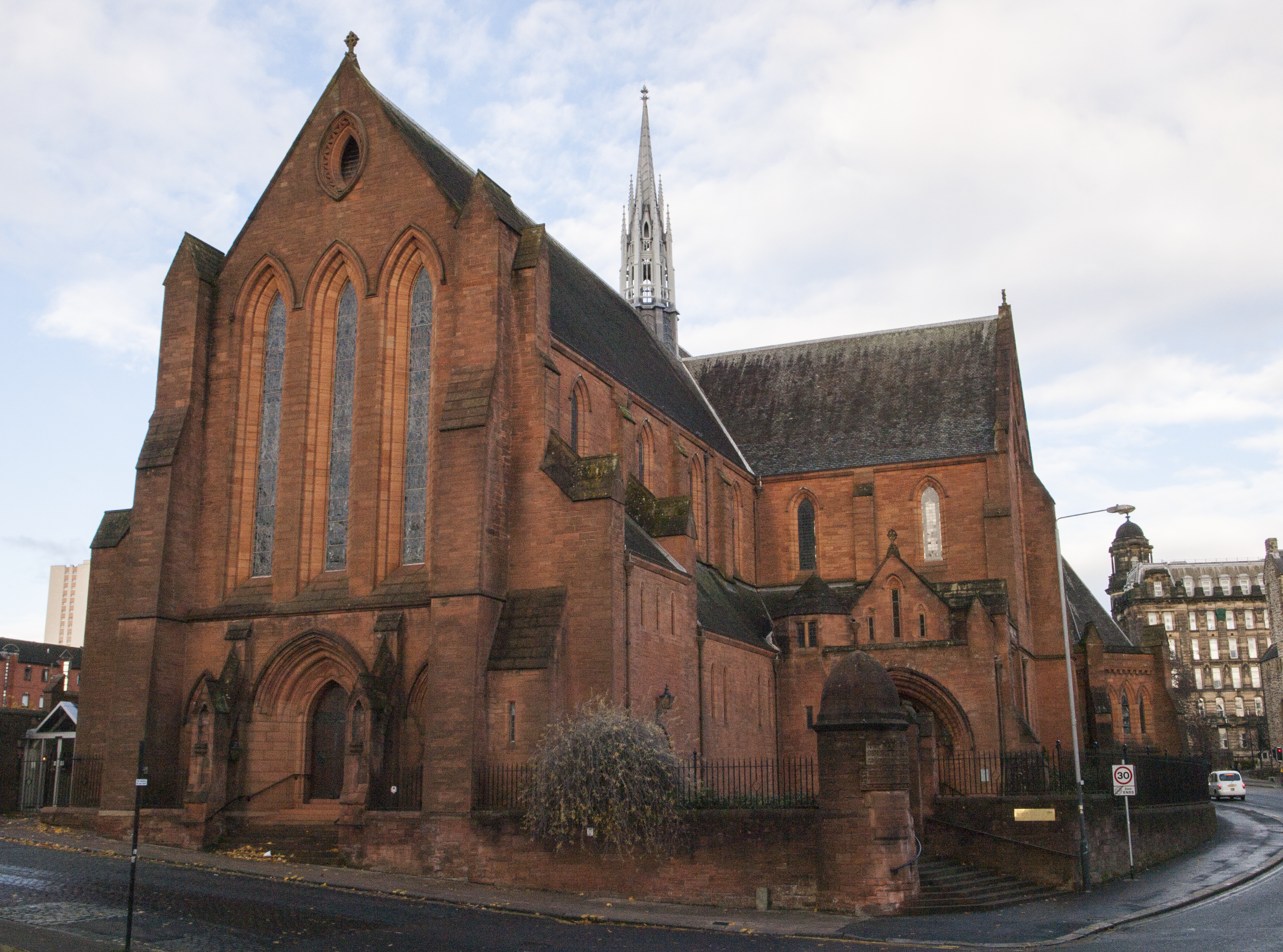
Barony Church in Glasgow

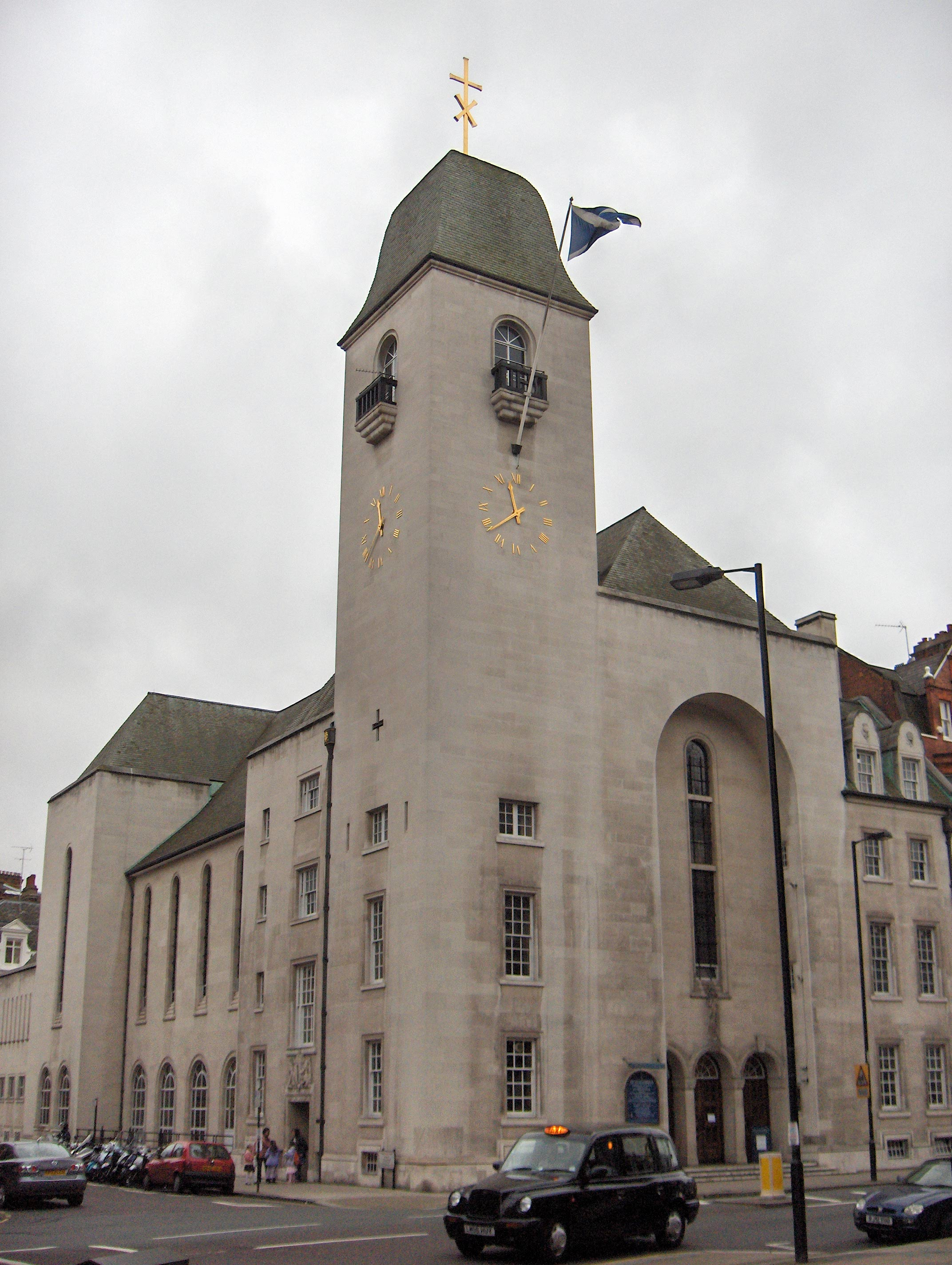
St Columba's Church in London

== Life ==
He was born in 1897 the son of William Frank Scott of Logie Buchan in Aberdeenshire.

Up until 1927 he was minister of Strathmiglo. In 1927 he succeeded the late Rev Harcourt Morton Davidson as minister of St Andrews Parish Church in Dundee. In 1935 he was translated to the Barony Church in Glasgow, replacing Rev John White, and himself being replaced in Dundee by Rev William Thomas Smellie.

From 1939 he was minister of St Columba's Church (Church of Scotland) on Pont Street in Belgravia in London.

He was minister at the church on 10 May 1941 when it was severely damaged during the blitz in the Second World War. He then strived for ten years to rebuild the church.

In March 1956, with Queen Elizabeth II, he conducted the ceremony to dedicate the war memorial chapel within the church to the London Scottish Regiment.
