= Scottish Churches Parliamentary Office =

The Scottish Churches Parliamentary Office (SCPO) was created in 1999, at the same time as the devolved Scottish Parliament was established. The office is an ecumenical partnership that works to build good relations between Scottish Churches, the Scottish and UK Parliaments and the Scottish and UK Governments.

When first established the SCPO was based at St Columba's by the Castle Episcopal Church in Edinburgh and later at The Netherbow (the Scottish Storytelling Centre) on Edinburgh's Royal Mile before moving to Scottish Churches Housing Action in Hanover Street, Edinburgh. SCPO is currently based at the Church of Scotland's main administration office at 121 George Street, Edinburgh.

Many of the churches in Scotland were strongly supportive of devolution. Before the new Scottish Parliament building at Holyrood was completed in 2004 the Scottish Parliament met in the General Assembly Hall of the Church of Scotland.

The first Scottish Churches Parliamentary Officer (1999–2008) was the Revd Dr Graham Blount, who was formerly joint minister at Falkirk Old and St Modan's Parish Church. The post has since been held by Chloe Clemmons (2009–2019) and Irene Mackinnon (2019–2020). The current Scottish Churches Parliamentary Officer (since 2020) is David Bradwell.
