= Church of Scotland offices =

Building in Edinburgh, Scotland

Coordinates: 55°57′8.80″N 3°12′17.02″W

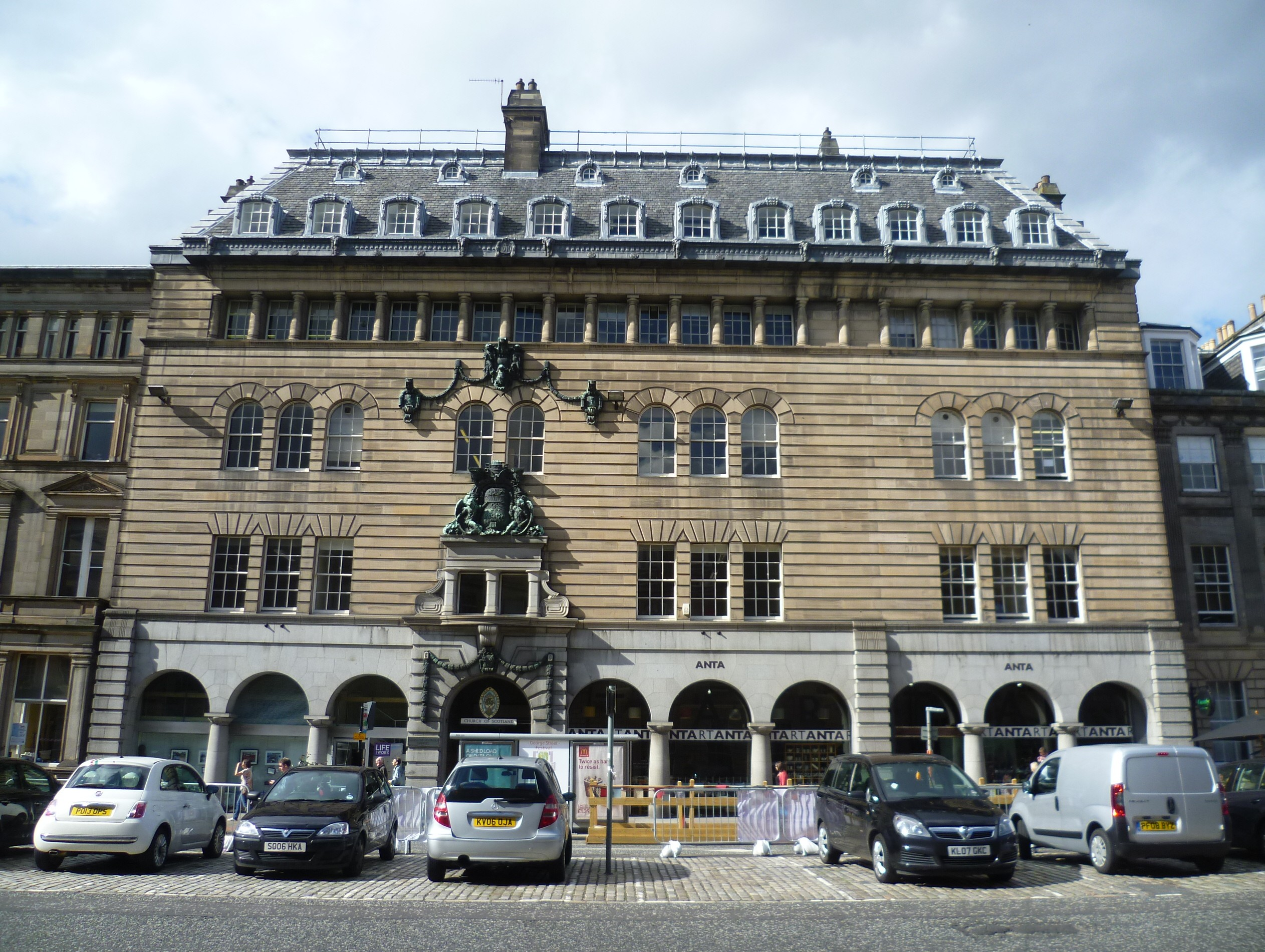
The Church of Scotland Offices

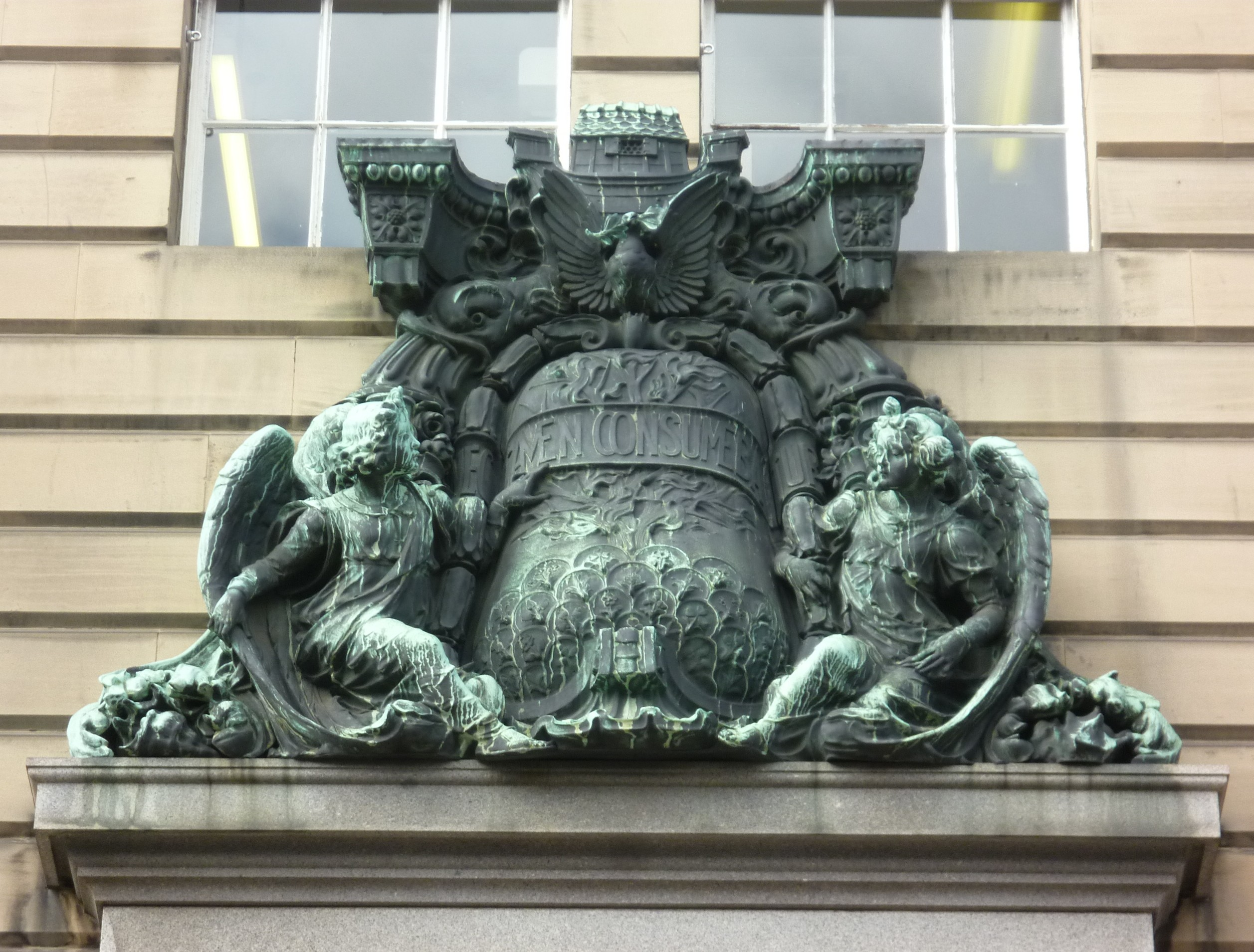
Sculpture of the Church's "Burning Bush" emblem above the entrance

The Church of Scotland offices are located in the centre of Edinburgh, Scotland (in the New Town), at 121 George Street. These imposing buildings are popularly known in Church circles as "one-two-one". They were designed in a Scandinavian-influenced style by the architect Sydney Mitchell and built in 1909–1911 for the United Free Church of Scotland. Following the union of the Church of Scotland and the United Free Church of Scotland in 1929 the church offices were henceforth used by the newly united church.

A matching extension, incorporating a ground floor bookshop, was built in the 1930s on the east side (119 George Street). A proposed matching extension on the west side (replacing the still-existing buildings at 123 George Street) was never built. 123 George Street is, however, owned by the Church of Scotland and has been incorporated into the offices. The church offices also incorporate a chapel near the main entrance and a staff canteen in the basement.

The title used is always "church offices" and never "headquarters". There are periodically suggestions within the Church of Scotland that the current church offices should be sold, relocating to new premises outside Edinburgh. Such a decision could only be taken by the General Assembly; so far no proposals have been made.

The offices of the Moderator, Principal Clerk, General Treasurer, Law Department and all the church councils are located at the church offices. The one major exception is the Social Care Council (CrossReach) which is located outside the city centre at Charis House, 47 Milton Road East, Edinburgh.

The building is managed and maintained by the Church of Scotland's Facilities Management Department.
