= Rubislaw Church =

Church in Aberdeen, Scotland

Coordinates: 57.14345°N 2.1275°W

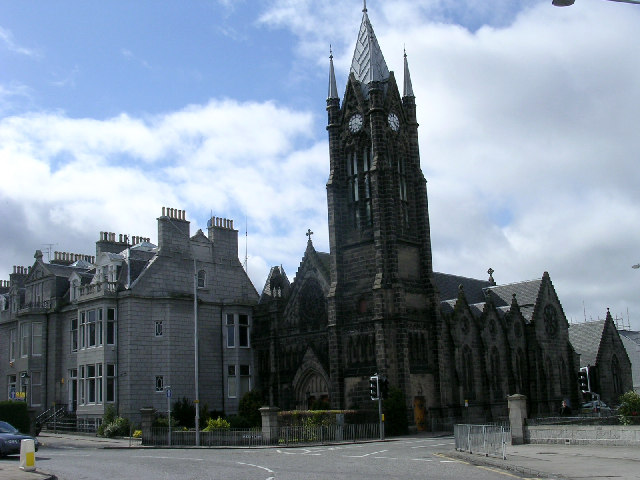
- View of the church from Queens Road
- Rubislaw Church
- Denomination: Church of Scotland
- Churchmanship: Reformed
- Website: www.rubislawchurch.org.uk

Rubislaw Church is a Church of Scotland parish church in the Queen's Cross area of Aberdeen, Scotland. It has a recently refurbished church centre on Fountainhall Road.

== History ==
Rubislaw Church was constructed as part of a national Church of Scotland expansion campaign following the Disruption of 1843. It was constructed in 1874. Unusually for Aberdeen, the church is built out of sandstone opposed to granite as the majority of the buildings in Aberdeen are. George Washington Wilson offered to pay for the building to be constructed in granite but was too late as the contract had already been signed. It was constructed to serve three new parishes. In 1880, the church was expanded with a tower and spire added. It is speculated that the spire was built just to compete with the Free Church of Scotland's Queen's Cross Church across the street.

In 1985, the church was granted grade B heritage status by Historic Scotland. In 2019, the Church of Scotland announced they were planning to sell Rubislaw Church as part of a church consolidation plan.

== Manse ==
The minister of the church had originally lived in a manse bungalow in the church's graveyard until 1922 when a six bedroom house was purchased by the Church of Scotland in Rubislaw Den. In 2016, the church announced plans to sell the new manse for £1 million representing the largest amount raised by the church following a manse sale.

== See also ==
- List of Church of Scotland parishes
- Queens Cross Area
