= Forward Together (Scotland) =

Forward Together is an evangelical organisation within the Church of Scotland which acts as a pressure group on a variety of issues. It was founded in 1994 and currently represents 600 ministers and members of the Church of Scotland.

It supports what it considers to be traditional biblical values on all issues including civil partnerships, same-sex blessings and embryonic stem cell research.

In 2006 the group's Secretary, Rev Ian Watson, said the central management of the Church in Edinburgh was following a "left-wing, liberal agenda" which was contrary to the wishes of the vast majority of ordinary Church members. He also criticised the continual appointment of liberals to the position of Moderator. This view was supported by a survey which showed that 60% of respondents thought the Church had lost its way spiritually and theologically, and 75% said the appointment of Moderators did not reflect the Church membership, lamenting the reluctance of the Church to speak out against issues such as gay adoption and civil partnerships in the same way the Roman Catholic Church does.

In 2007 it was successful in securing the rejection of same-sex blessings by 36 presbyteries against to 9 in favour. However by December 2014 that situation had dramatically changed with 60% of presbyteries voting to accept sexually active homosexuals in ministry and the denomination turning a blind-eye to the blessing of same sex relationships.

Forward Together has failed to halt the continuing loss of evangelical congregations from the Church of Scotland, with the largest evangelical congregations, Holyrood in Edinburgh, St George's Tron Church in Glasgow and Gilcomston in Aberdeen among those who have left. The former secretary Rev Ian Watson has also left the denomination and is now a minister of the Free Church of Scotland, an evangelical Presbyterian denomination.

In December 2014 a new grouping "Covenant Fellowship Scotland" was launched following the final Presbytery vote on adopting an Overture which would permit those in same-sex civil partnerships to serve as ministers and deacons in the Church. Forward Together merged with Covenant Fellowship Scotland "drawing together those in the Church of Scotland who believe that the Scriptures, in their entirety, are the Word of God and must provide the basis for everything Christians believe and do."

The new grouping again failed to halt the adoption at the 2015 General Assembly of the legislation allowing congregations to opt out of biblical norms and call active homosexuals in civil partnership to serve as ministers and deacons. It also failed to prevent proposed legislation being sent down to presbyteries to extend this law to those in gay marriages. It did, however, succeed in supporting a moratorium on any discipline against ministers who had already entered into gay marriages. This motion was seconded by a leading figure in Forward Together who claimed that such discipline would be against "natural justice".

== External ==
- Forward Together Home Page
- Covenant Fellowship Scotland Home Page
