= Church of Scotland =

National church of Scotland

Coordinates: 55°56′59″N 3°11′42″W

Church of Scotland
- Kirk o Scotland; Eaglais na h-Alba
- Abbreviation: CoS
- Type: Established church; National church
- Classification: Protestant
- Orientation: Presbyterian
- Scripture: Protestant Bible
- Theology: Reformed
- Polity: Presbyteral
- Governance: General Assembly of the Church of Scotland
- Moderator: Gordon Kennedy (2026-27)
- Lord High Commissioner: Elish Angiolini (2025-26)
- Chief Officer: Vacant (as of 18 September 2026)
- Associations: Action of Churches Together in Scotland; Churches Together in Britain and Ireland; Communion of Protestant Churches in Europe; World Communion of Reformed Churches; Conference of European Churches; World Council of Churches
- Region: Scotland
- Headquarters: 121 George Street, Edinburgh
- Territory: Scotland
- Founder: Ninian and Columba (founded the early missions to Scotland); Pope Celestine III (separated the Scottish churches from the Archdiocese of York's jurisdiction and established an independent national church, through the Papal bull Cum universi, in 1192); John Knox (reformed the Church of Scotland, through the Reformation Parliament, in 1560)
- Independence: 28 July 1921
- Separated from: Catholic Church
- Absorbed: 97% of the United Free Church of Scotland (1929); Original Secession Church (1956)
- Separations: Scottish Episcopal Church (1689); Associate Presbytery (1733); Relief Church (1761); Free Church of Scotland (1843); Didasko (2017)
- Congregations: 992 (2024)
- Members: 259,200 (2023) 245,000 (2024)
- Ministers: 495 (2024)
- Official website: churchofscotland.org.uk

The Church of Scotland (CoS; Scots: The Kirk o Scotland; Scottish Gaelic: Eaglais na h-Alba) is a Reformed denomination of Christianity that holds the status of the national and established church of Scotland. It is one of the country's larger denominations, having 229,000 members in 2025, or 4% of the Scottish population. In the 2022 census, 1,108,796 people, or 20% of the Scottish population, claimed affiliation with the church.

The Church of Scotland is Presbyterian in structure, meaning that is governed by presbyters or elders, selected from the body of the church. There is no one person who acts as the head of the faith, as the church believes that role is the "Lord God's". It is known familiarly as "the Kirk", this being the Scots equivalent of "church". The Church of Scotland was principally shaped by John Knox in the Reformation of 1560, when it split from the Church of Rome and established itself as a church in the Reformed tradition.

The Church of Scotland celebrates two sacraments, baptism and the Lord's Supper, as well as five other ordinances, such as confirmation and matrimony. The church adheres to the Bible and the Westminster Confession of Faith and is a member of the World Communion of Reformed Churches. The annual meeting of the church's general assembly is chaired by the Moderator of the General Assembly of the Church of Scotland.

== History ==
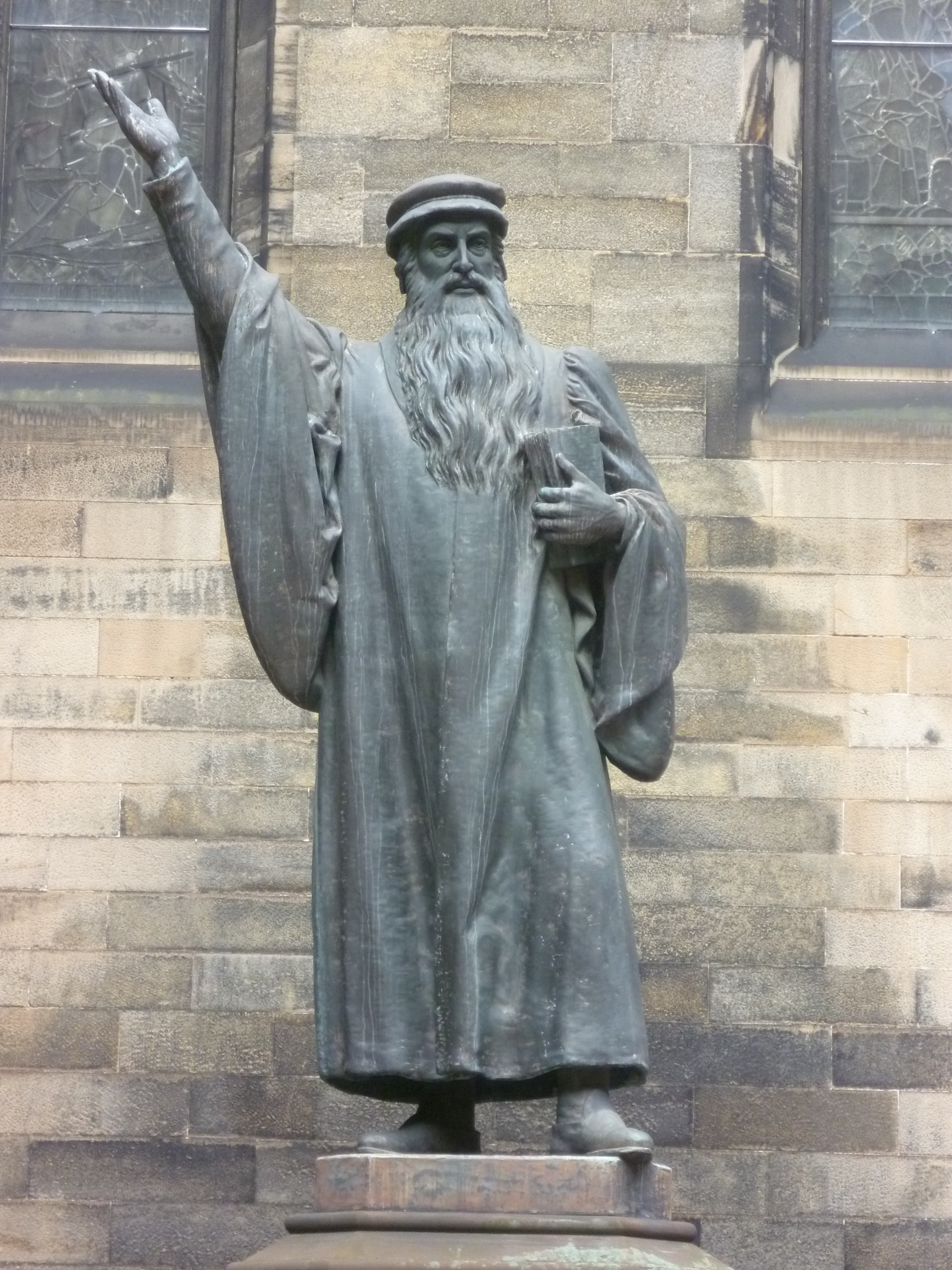
John Knox, who in 1559 returned from ministering in Geneva to lead the Reformation in Scotland.

=== Early traces ===
According to traditional Scottish historiography, the first Christians in Scotland were converted by Saint Ninian around 400 AD. Early Christian missionaries included Saint Columba, who founded a mission at Iona two centuries later. In 1192, the Papal bull Cum universi separated the Scottish church from the Archbishopric of York, creating an independent national church with no higher authority than the Pope.

=== Establishment and John Knox ===
The Church of Scotland, in its current form, traces its origins to the Scottish Reformation of 1560. At that point, many in the then church in Scotland broke with Rome in a process of Protestant reform led, among others, by John Knox. It reformed its doctrines and government, drawing on the principles of John Calvin, which Knox had been exposed to while living in Geneva, Switzerland. An assembly of some nobles, lairds, and burgesses, as well as several churchmen, claiming in defiance of the Queen to be a Scottish Parliament, abolished papal jurisdiction and approved the Scots Confession, but did not accept many of the principles laid out in Knox's First Book of Discipline, which argued, among other things, that all of the assets of the old church should pass to the new. The 1560 Reformation Settlement was not ratified by the crown, as Mary I, a Catholic, refused to do so, and the question of church government also remained unresolved. In 1572, the acts of 1560 were finally approved by the young James VI, but the Concordat of Leith also allowed the crown to appoint bishops with the church's approval. John Knox himself had no clear views on the office of bishop, preferring to see them renamed as 'superintendents' which is a translation of the Greek; but in response to the new Concordat, a Presbyterian party emerged headed by Andrew Melville, the author of the Second Book of Discipline.

Melville and his supporters enjoyed some temporary successes—most notably in the Golden Act of 1592, which gave parliamentary approval to Presbyterian courts. James VI, however, believed that presbyterianism was incompatible with monarchy, declaring "No bishop, no king". By skillful manipulation of both church and state, he steadily reintroduced parliamentary and then diocesan episcopacy; this approximately mirrored the structure of the Church of England, of which James had become Supreme Governor when he succeeded to the English throne in 1603. By the time he died in 1625, the Church of Scotland had a full panel of bishops and archbishops. General Assemblies met only at times and places approved by the Crown.

=== Wars of the Three Kingdoms ===
Timeline of the evolution of the churches of Scotland from the Reformation

Charles I inherited a settlement in Scotland based on a balanced compromise between Calvinist doctrine and episcopal polity. Lacking his father's political judgment, he began to upset this by moving into more dangerous areas. Disapproving of the 'plainness' of the Scottish service, he, together with his Archbishop of Canterbury, William Laud, sought to introduce the kind of liturgical practice in use in England. The centrepiece of this new strategy was the Scottish Prayer Book of 1637, a slightly modified version of the Anglican Book of Common Prayer. Although a panel of Scottish bishops devised this, Charles's insistence that it be drawn up secretly and adopted sight unseen led to widespread discontent. When the Prayer Book was finally introduced at St Giles Cathedral in Edinburgh in mid-1637, it caused an outbreak of rioting, which, starting with Jenny Geddes, spread across Scotland. In early 1638, the National Covenant was signed by large numbers of Scots, protesting the introduction of the Prayer Book and other liturgical innovations that had not first been tested and approved by free Parliaments and General Assemblies of the Church. In November 1638, the General Assembly in Glasgow, the first to meet for twenty years, not only declared the Prayer Book unlawful but went on to abolish the office of bishop itself. The Church of Scotland was then established on a Presbyterian basis. Charles' attempt to resist these developments led to the Bishops' Wars. In the ensuing civil wars, the Scots Covenanters at one point made common cause with the English parliamentarians—resulting in the Westminster Confession of Faith being agreed by both. This document remains the subordinate standard of the Church of Scotland but was replaced in England after the Restoration.

=== The Restoration ===
Episcopacy was reintroduced to Scotland after the Restoration, which caused considerable discontent, especially in the country's southwest, where the Presbyterian tradition was strongest. The modern situation largely dates from 1690, when after the Glorious Revolution, the majority of Scottish bishops were non-jurors; that is, they believed they could not swear allegiance to William III of England and Mary II of England while James VII lived. To reduce their influence, the Scots Parliament guaranteed Presbyterian governance of the church with the Confession of Faith Ratification Act, excluding what became the Scottish Episcopal Church. Most of the remaining Covenanters disagreed with the Restoration Settlement on various political and theological grounds, most notably because the Settlement did not acknowledge the National Covenant and Solemn League and Covenant, and so did not join the Church of Scotland, instead forming the Reformed Presbyterian Church of Scotland in 1690.

=== Independence of the church ===
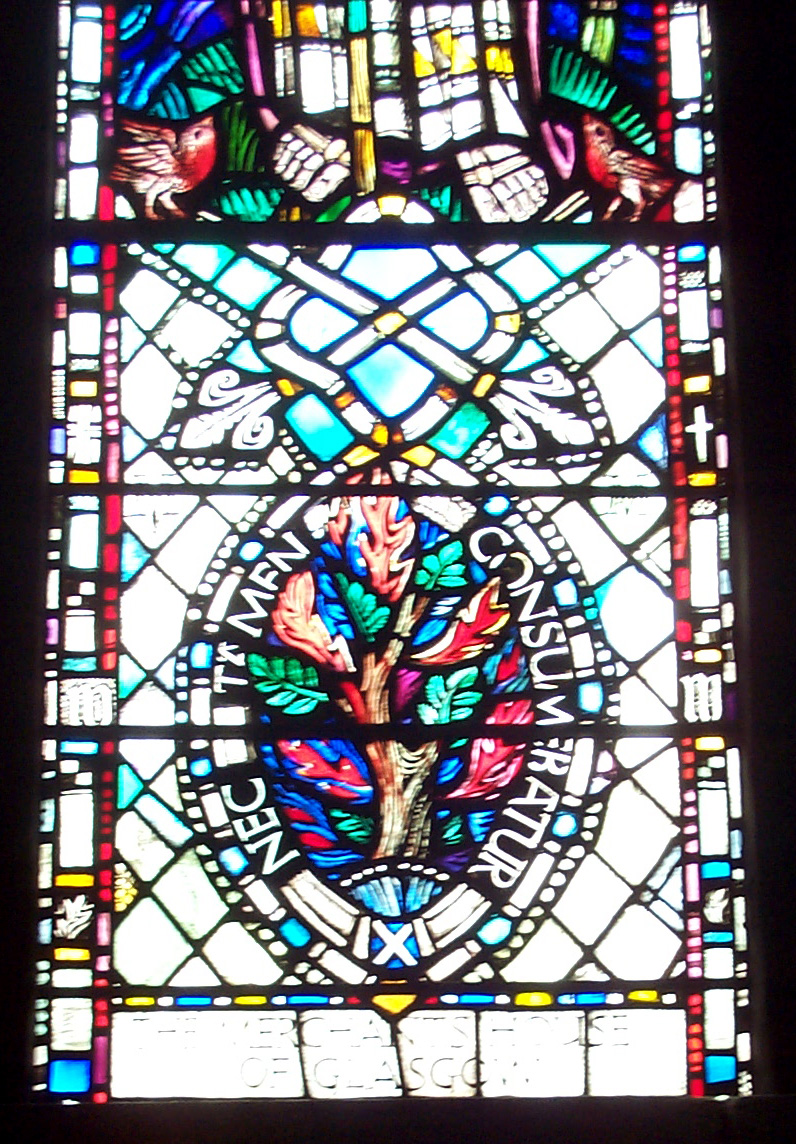
Stained glass showing the burning bush and the motto "nec tamen consumebatur", St. Mungo's Cathedral, Glasgow.

Controversy still surrounded the relationship between the Church of Scotland's independence and the civil law of Scotland. The interference of civil courts with church decisions, particularly over the appointment of ministers, following the Church Patronage (Scotland) Act 1711, which gave landowners, or patrons, the right to appoint ministers to vacant pulpits, would lead to several splits. This began with the secession of 1733 and culminated in the Disruption of 1843 when a large portion of the church broke away to form the Free Church of Scotland. The seceding groups tended to divide and reunite among themselves—leading to a proliferation of Presbyterian denominations in Scotland, as is demonstrated in the timeline above.

The UK Parliament passed the Church of Scotland Act 1921, finally recognising the complete independence of the church in matters spiritual, and as a result of this, and passage of the Church of Scotland (Property and Endowments) Act 1925 (15 & 16 Geo. 5. c. 33), the church was able to unite with the United Free Church of Scotland in 1929. The United Free Church of Scotland was itself the product of the union of the former United Presbyterian Church of Scotland and the majority of the Free Church of Scotland in 1900. The 1929 assembly of church leaders to effect the Union of that year met at Industrial Hall on Annandale Street in north Edinburgh.

Some independent Scottish Presbyterian denominations still remain. These include the Free Church of Scotland—sometimes given the epithet The Wee Frees—(originally formed of those congregations which refused to unite with the United Presbyterian Church in 1900), the United Free Church of Scotland (formed of congregations which refused to unite with the Church of Scotland in 1929), the Free Presbyterian Church of Scotland (which broke from the Free Church of Scotland in 1893), the Associated Presbyterian Churches (which emerged as a result of a split in the Free Presbyterian Church of Scotland in the 1980s) and the Free Church of Scotland (Continuing) (which emerged from a split in the Free Church of Scotland in 2000). The motto of the Church of Scotland is nec tamen consumebatur (Latin)—"Yet it was not consumed", an allusion to Exodus 3:2 and the Burning Bush.

=== Recent history ===
In 2023, the Church of Scotland published a report which detailed its connections to the Atlantic slave trade. It noted that from 1707 to the 1830s, Church of Scotland ministers and elders inherited wealth from familial relatives which were made on West Indian slave plantations and numerous church buildings (including Glasgow Cathedral) contain memorials to and accepted donations from individuals who profited from slavery. The report also noted that enslaved Black people were used to build Church of Scotland churches in the West Indies, and the church distributed money made from slavery to Scottish parishes to fund philanthropic efforts that assisted Scotland's poor. It ended by recommending to the General Assembly that "a statement of acknowledgment and apology should be brought to a future General Assembly and a dedicated page about the Church's connections to the slave trade should be created for its website."

In 2025, Lady Elish Angiolini became the first practising Roman Catholic to be appointed Lord High Commissioner to the General Assembly of the Church of Scotland, the British Monarch's representative to the Assembly.

=== Controversies ===
In 2019, the Church of Scotland paid £1 million in damages to three siblings who had been raped at the Lord and Lady Polwarth children's home.

== Theology and practice ==
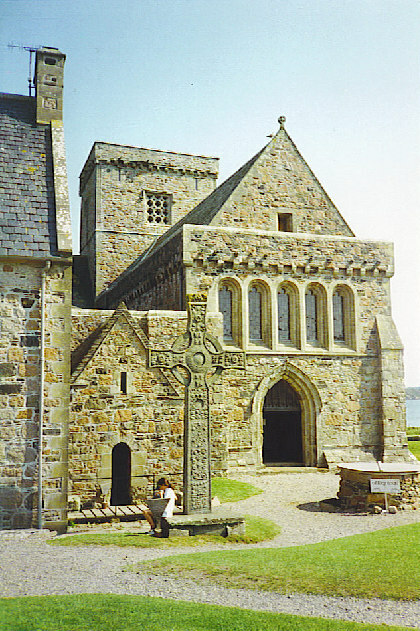
Iona Abbey in Scotland was founded by Saint Columba.

The basis of faith for the Church of Scotland is the Word of God, which it views as being "contained in the Scriptures of the Old and New Testament". For most of the church's history, the principal subordinate standard was The Westminster Confession of Faith (1647), although liberty of opinion is granted on those matters "which do not enter into the substance of the faith" (Art. 2 and 5). In 2026 a new Book of Confessions was published, in which the Westminster Confession was supplemented by a number of other historic and modern creeds and confessions:

The Apostles' Creed

The Nicene Creed

The Scots Confession (1560)

The 1992 Statement of Faith

The Church of Scotland has no compulsory prayer book, although it does have a hymn book (the 4th edition was published in 2005). Its Book of Common Order contains recommendations for public worship, which are usually followed fairly closely in the case of sacraments and ordinances. Preaching is the central focus of most services. Traditionally, Scots worship centred on the singing of metrical psalms and paraphrases, but for generations these have been supplemented with Christian music of all types. The typical Church of Scotland service lasts about an hour. There is normally no sung or responsive liturgy, but worship is the responsibility of the minister in each parish, and the style of worship can vary and be quite experimental. In recent years, a variety of modern song books have been widely used to appeal more to contemporary trends in music, and elements from alternative liturgies including those of the Iona Community are incorporated in some congregations. Although traditionally worship is conducted by the parish minister, participation and leadership by members who are not ministers in services is becoming more frequent, especially in the Highlands and the Borders.

In common with other Reformed denominations, the church recognises two sacraments: Baptism and Holy Communion (the Lord's Supper). The church baptises both believing adults and the children of Christian families. Communion in the Church of Scotland today is open to Christians of whatever denomination, without precondition. If baptised as an infant, one is expected to make the public profession of faith as part of a confirmation ceremony. Communion services are usually taken fairly seriously in the church; traditionally, a congregation held only three or four per year, although practice now greatly varies between congregations. In some congregations, communion is celebrated once a month.

Theologically, the Church of Scotland is Reformed (ultimately in the Calvinist tradition) and is a member of the World Alliance of Reformed Churches.

=== Ecumenical relations ===
The Church of Scotland is a member of ACTS (Action of Churches Together in Scotland) and, through its Committee on Ecumenical Relations, works closely with other denominations in Scotland. The present inter-denominational co-operation marks a distinct change from attitudes in certain quarters of the church in the early twentieth century and before, when opposition to Irish Roman Catholic immigration was vocal (see Catholicism in Scotland). The Church of Scotland is a member of the World Council of Churches, the Conference of European Churches, the Community of Protestant Churches in Europe, and the World Communion of Reformed Churches. The Church of Scotland is a member of Churches Together in Britain and Ireland and, through its Presbytery of England, is a member of Churches Together in England. The Church of Scotland continues to foster relationships with other Presbyterian denominations in Scotland even where agreement is difficult. In May 2016 the Church of Scotland ratified the Columba Agreement (approved by the Church of England's General Synod in February 2016), calling for the two churches to work more closely together on matters of common interest. In 2022, the Church of Scotland and the Catholic Bishops Conference of Scotland agreed a declaration of friendship between the Church of Scotland and the Catholic Church.

=== "God's Invitation" ===
While the Bible is the basis of faith of the Church of Scotland, and the Westminster Confession of Faith is the subordinate standard, a request was presented to a General Assembly of the Church of Scotland for a statement explaining the historic Christian faith in jargon-free non-theological language. "God's Invitation" was prepared to fulfil that request. The full statement reads:

God made the world and all its creatures with men and women made in His image.

By breaking His laws people have broken contact with God, and damaged His good world. This we see and sense in the world and in ourselves.

The Bible tells us the Good News that God still loves us and has shown His love uniquely in His Son, Jesus Christ. He lived among us and died on the cross to save us from our sin. But God raised Him from the dead!

In His love, this living Jesus invites us to turn from our sins and enter by faith into a restored relationship with God Who gives true life before and beyond death.

Then, with the power of the Holy Spirit remaking us like Jesus, we—with all Christians—worship God, enjoy His friendship and are available for Him to use in sharing and showing His love, justice, and peace locally and globally until Jesus returns!

In Jesus' name we gladly share with you God's message for all people—You matter to God!

It was approved for use by the General Assembly of the Church of Scotland in May 1992.

== Beliefs ==
Older rectangular logo of the Church of Scotland

The national church has never shied from involvement in Scottish politics. In 1919, the General Assembly created a Church and Nation Committee, which in 2005 became the Church and Society Council, and in 2019 merged with the World Mission Council to create the Faith Impact Forum. The Church of Scotland is a firm opponent of nuclear weaponry. Supporting devolution, it was one of the parties involved in the Scottish Constitutional Convention, which resulted in the setting up of the Scottish Parliament in 1997. Indeed, from 1999 to 2004 the Parliament met in the church's Assembly Hall in Edinburgh, while its own building was being constructed. The Church of Scotland supports the Scottish Churches Parliamentary Office in Edinburgh, an ecumenical partnership which is staffed and resourced by the Church.

=== Ordination ===
Since 1968, all ministries and offices in the church have been open to women and men on an equal basis. In 2004, Alison Elliot was chosen to be Moderator of the General Assembly, the first woman in the post and the first non-minister to be chosen since George Buchanan, four centuries before. In May 2007 Sheilagh M. Kesting became the first female minister to be Moderator. There are currently 218 serving female ministers, with 677 male ministers.

In May 2009, there was opposition to an attempt to install as minister an openly gay man who intended to live with his partner once appointed to his post. A dissent and complaint was lodged against a decision of the Presbytery of Aberdeen against the appointment of Scott Rennie, the church's first out, non-celibate gay minister to Queen's Cross Church in Aberdeen. In Aitken et al v the Presbytery of Aberdeen, they argued that the Church of Scotland had never voted to depart from the historic practice and belief that sexual activity should only take place within a marriage between a man and woman.

In a landmark decision on 23 May 2009 the General Assembly (GA) ratified by 326 to 267 the appointment of Rennie. Rennie had won the overwhelming support of his prospective church members at Queen's Cross, Aberdeen, but his appointment was in some doubt until extensive debate and this vote by the commissioners to the assembly. The GA later, on 25 May, agreed upon a moratorium on the appointment of further non-celibate gay people until after a special commission has reported on the matter.

As a result of these developments, a new grouping of congregations within the church was begun "to declare their clear commitment to historic Christian orthodoxy", known as the Fellowship of Confessing Churches. In May 2011, the GA of the Church of Scotland voted to appoint a theological commission with a view to fully investigating the matter, reporting to the General Assembly of 2013. Meanwhile, openly homosexual ministers ordained before 2009 would be allowed to keep their posts without fear of sanction. On 20 May 2013, the GA voted in favour of a proposal that allowed liberal parishes to opt out of the church's policy on homosexuality. Since 2008, 25 out of 808 (3%) ministers had left over the issue. It was reported that seceding congregations had a combined annual income of £1 million. Many of these Churches have either wholly, or in large part, joined denominations such as the Free Church of Scotland, or became the Didasko Fellowship. These include: St George's Tron, Kirkmuirhill, Lesmahagow: Abbeygreen, Mearns Castle in Newton Mearns, High Hilton in Aberdeen, St Catherine's Argyle in Edinburgh, Gilcomston Church amongst many others.

=== Marriage ===
In 2015, the Church of Scotland's GA voted in favour of recommending that gay ministers be able to enter into same-sex marriages. and allowing pastors to enter in same-sex civil partnerships. On 21 May 2016, the GA voted in favour of the approval for gay and lesbian ministers to enter into same-sex marriages. In 2017, there was a report to be debated at the church's General Assembly in May that proposed "having a church committee research allowing nominated ministers and deacons to carry out the ceremonies, but...to retain the ability for 'contentious refusal' from those opposed to same-sex marriage."

A Theological Forum report calling for the approval of blessings of same-sex marriage, and an apology to LGBTI people for past mistreatment was approved by the General Assembly on 25 May 2017. In 2018, the church's assembly voted in favour of drafting a new church law to allow same-sex marriages and to give ministers the option of performing same-sex marriages. The church was expected to vote on a final poll in 2021 but, after being considered at a GA in May 2021, a draft plan might still be being considered by commissioners prior to being shared with all presbyteries for their consideration under the Church of Scotland's Barrier Act 1697 and being brought back to a future General Assembly. On 23 May 2022 the GA voted in favour of same-sex marriage with 274 for and 136 against. Clergy will be allowed to conduct the marriages but will not be forced to.

=== Abortion ===
The Church of Scotland took an anti-abortion stance on the past, stating that it should be allowed "only on grounds that the continuance of the pregnancy would involve serious risk to the life or grave injury to the health, whether physical or mental, of the pregnant woman." The Church of Scotland more recently has taken a neutral stance on abortion, acknowledging the variety of viewpoints within the church's membership: "In the absence of a recent or specific view [on abortion] expressed by the General Assembly there is likely to be a broad diversity of opinion within the membership of the Church of Scotland."

=== Euthanasia ===
The Church of Scotland opposes euthanasia: "The Church of Scotland supports the current law, which prohibits assisted dying. The 2025 General Assembly acknowledged that there are a diversity of sincerely held theological views within our broad Church, but nevertheless reaffirmed the Church of Scotland's long- held opposition to assisted dying."

=== Capital punishment ===
Historically, the Church of Scotland supported the death penalty; the General Assembly once called for the "vigorous execution" of Thomas Aikenhead, who was found guilty of blasphemy in 1696. Nowadays, the church strongly disapproves of the death penalty: "The Church of Scotland affirms that capital punishment is always and wholly unacceptable and does not provide an answer even to the most heinous of crimes. It commits itself to working with other churches and agencies to advance this understanding, oppose death sentences and executions and promote the cause of abolition of the death penalty worldwide."

=== Divorce ===
The Church of Scotland does not consider marriage to be a sacrament, and thus not binding forever, and has no moral objection to the remarriage of divorced persons. The minister who is asked to perform a ceremony for someone who has a prior spouse living may inquire for the purpose of ensuring that the problems which led to the divorce do not recur.

== Position in Scottish society ==
Historical Population
Year	Pop.	±%
2001	2,146,251	—
2011	1,717,871	−20.0%
2022	1,107,796	−35.5%
Religious Affiliation was not recorded in the census prior to 2001. Source: National Records of Scotland

At the time of the 2001 census, the number of respondents who gave their religion as Church of Scotland was 2,146,251 which amounted to 42.4% of the population of Scotland. In 2013, the Church of Scotland had around 995 active ministers, 1,118 congregations, and its official membership at 398,389 comprised about 7.5% of the population of Scotland. Official membership is down some 66.5% from its peak in 1957 of 1.32 million. In the 2011 national census, 32% of Scots identified their religion as "Church of Scotland", more than any other faith group, but falling behind the total of those without religion for the first time. However, by 2013 only 18% of Scots self-identified as Church of Scotland. Though according to the 2014 Scottish Annual Household Survey, 27.8%, or 1.5 million adherents, identified the Church of Scotland as the church of their religion. In 2019, according to the Scottish Household Survey, 20% of Scots self-reported themselves as adherents of the Church of Scotland. The Church of Scotland Guild, the church's historical women's movement and open to men and women since 1997, is still the largest voluntary organisation in Scotland.

According to the 2011 census, among respondents who identified with the church, 96% were white Scots, 3% were other white people, and 1% were from other ethnic groups; this broadly reflects Scotland's demographic make-up.

Although it is the national church, it is not a state church; this and other regards makes it dissimilar to the Church of England (the established church in England). Under its constitution (recognised by the 1921 act of the British Parliament), the church enjoys complete independence from the state in spiritual matters. When in Scotland, the British monarch simply attends church, as opposed to their role in the English Church as Supreme Governor. The monarch's accession oath includes a promise to "maintain and preserve the Protestant Religion and Presbyterian Church Government". They are formally represented at the annual General Assembly by a Lord High Commissioner unless they choose to attend in person; the role is purely formal, and the monarch has no right to take part in deliberations.

The church is committed to its 'distinctive call and duty to bring the ordinances of religion to the people in every parish of Scotland through a territorial ministry' (Article 3 of its Articles Declaratory). The church played a leading role in providing universal education in Scotland (the first such provision in the modern world), largely due to its teaching that all should be able to read the Bible. However, it ceased operating its schools, which were transferred to the state, in the latter half of the 19th century.

The Church of Scotland faces many current difficulties. Between 1966 and 2006, the number of members fell from over 1,230,000 to 504,000, reducing further to 446,000 in 2010 380,164 by 2014, 336,000 by 2017, and 325,695 by 2018, representing about 6% of the Scottish population. The Scottish Church Census of 2016 reported that just under 137,000 people worshipped on an average Sunday in a Church of Scotland, approximately 41% of the stated membership. However, according to the 2024 Assembly Trustees Report, only 61,580 were attending an average Sunday worship service in person during 2023.

In 2016 the church faced a £5.7 million deficit amid costly upkeep of many older ecclesiastical buildings. In response the church decided to 'prune to grow', reducing ministry provision plans from 1,234 to 1,000 funded posts (1,075 established FTE posts, of which 75 would be vacant at any one time) supported by a variety of voluntary and part-time ministries. At the same time the number of candidates accepted for full-time ministry has reduced from 24 (2005) to 8 (2009). Since 2014, the number of full-time candidates accepted into training each year has been in the range of 13 to 16. At the 2016 General Assembly the Moderator pointed to issues such as: 25% of charges without a minister; all but two ministers over the age of 30; falling clergy numbers over the coming six years (anticipated that for each newly recruited minister there will be four retirements).

By 2021 membership was continuing to decline year on year, leading to a new plan "without which the church would not survive." The proposal reduced the number of ministry posts by 40%; to 660 of which 60 would be vacant at any one time, and was said to offer the church a chance to thrive. By December 2022 the Church had 270,300 members, a 4.7% decline from 2021, and representing an overall decline of 35% since 2012. At 31 December 2025, the congregations of the Church of Scotland recorded 229,000 members, a fall of 5% from 2024.

This lack of those in training towards ministry has threatened the viability of the church's theological training colleges. During the 2019 General Assembly, the Ministries Council announced that they were looking to reduce the number of Academic Partners who train current ministry students from five, to either one or two. The five current academic partners are University of Glasgow, University of Edinburgh, University of Aberdeen, University of St Andrews and, most recently, Highland Theological College. In 2026 General Assembly, it was decided that, from the 2027 intake, all prospective Church of Scotland students would study through Glasgow University.

== Social and political issues ==
=== Israeli–Palestinian conflict ===
In April 2013, the church published a report entitled "The Inheritance of Abraham: A Report on the 'Promised' Land" which included a discussion of Israeli and Jewish claims to the Land of Israel. The report said "there has been a widespread assumption by many Christians as well as many Jewish people that the Bible supports an essentially Jewish state of Israel. This raises an increasing number of difficulties and current Israeli policies regarding the Palestinians have sharpened this questioning", and that "promises about the Land of Israel were never intended to be taken literally". The church responded to criticism by saying that "The Church has never and is not now denying Israel's right to exist; on the contrary, it is questioning the policies that continue to keep peace a dream in Israel and the Occupied Palestinian Territory. This report is against the injustices levelled against the Palestinian people and how land is shared. It is also a reflection of the use or misuse of scripture to claim divine right to land by any group" and says it must "refute claims that scripture offers any peoples a privileged claim for possession of a particular territory".

The Scottish Council of Jewish Communities sharply criticised the report, describing it as follows: "It reads like an Inquisition-era polemic against Jews and Judaism. It is biased, weak on sources, and contradictory. The picture it paints of both Judaism and Israel is barely even a caricature. The arrogance of telling the Jewish people how to interpret Jewish texts and Jewish theology is breathtaking." The report was also criticised by the Anti-Defamation League and the Israeli envoy to the United Kingdom.

In response to criticism, the church quickly replaced the original version with a modified one, stating that criticism of Israel's policies toward the Palestinians "should not be misunderstood as questioning the right of the State of Israel to exist".

In May 2025 the church condemned the war of Gaza, and in September of that year signed a joint statement with the Catholic Bishops' Conference of Scotland urging the UK government to recognize the State of Palestine. The church continues to pray for peace in the region.

== Governance and administration ==
Flag of the Church of Scotland

The Church of Scotland is Presbyterian in polity and Reformed in theology. The most recent articulation of its legal position, the Articles Declaratory (1921), spells out the key concepts.

=== Courts and assemblies ===
As a Presbyterian church, the church has no bishops but is rather governed by elders and ministers (collectively called presbyters) sitting in a series of courts. Each congregation is led by a Session. The Sessions in turn are answerable to regional presbyteries (of which the church currently has 14). The supreme body is the annual General Assembly, which meets each May in Edinburgh. Until the mid 1990s, the Church of Scotland also had Synods, representing a layer of governance between Presbyteries and the General Assembly.

==== National Youth Assembly ====
The National Youth Assembly, often shortened to NYA, was an annual gathering of young people aged between 17 and 25 years old within the Church of Scotland. It ran from 1994 to 2019 and was run by the Mission and Discipleship Council of the Church, as part of Church of Scotland Youth (CoSY). The NYA discussed different topics every year and determined what they wish to say on these topics through the medium of debate (deliberately akin to that of the General Assembly).

=== Moderator ===
Arms of the Moderator of the General Assembly

Each court is convened by the 'moderator'—at the local level of the Session normally the parish minister who is ex officio member and Moderator of the Session. Congregations where there is no minister, or where the minister is incapacitated, may be moderated by a specially trained elder. Presbyteries and the General Assembly elect a moderator each year. The Moderator of the General Assembly serves for the year as the public representative of the church, but beyond that enjoys no special powers or privileges and is in no sense the leader or official spokesperson of the church. At all levels, moderators may be either elders or ministers. Only Moderators of Sessions are obliged to be trained for the role.

The official residence of the Moderator is Number 2 Rothesay Terrace in Edinburgh.

=== National General Assembly Bodies ===
At a national level, the work of the Church of Scotland is chiefly carried out by bodies appointed by the General Assembly, each supported by full-time staff mostly based at the Church of Scotland Offices in Edinburgh. Following a major reform (described as a "Radical Action Plan") agreed at the 2019 General Assembly, the major central bodies are now:

- Faith Impact Forum (replaced the former Church and Society Council and World Mission Council)
- Faith Nurture Forum (replacing the former Ministries Council and Mission and Discipleship Council)
- Social Care Council (based at Charis House, Edinburgh)

The Church of Scotland's Social Care Council (known as CrossReach) is the largest provider of social care in Scotland today, running projects for various disadvantaged and vulnerable groups: including care for the elderly; help with alcoholism, drug, and mental health problems; and assistance for the homeless.

A new body, the Assembly Trustees, was also created in 2019, to be the Charity Trustees of the Church and to head the Church's governance structure. There are 12 General Assembly appointed trustees, plus the Convener of the Assembly Business Committee and the Chair of the General Trustees (the body responsible for property).

The national church has never shied from involvement in Scottish politics. In 1919, the General Assembly created a Church and Nation Committee, which in 2005 became the Church and Society Council, and in 2019 merged with the World Mission Council to create the Faith Impact Forum. The Church of Scotland was (and is) a firm opponent of nuclear weaponry. Supporting devolution, it was one of the parties involved in the Scottish Constitutional Convention, which resulted in the setting up of the Scottish Parliament in 1997. Indeed, from 1999 to 2004 the Parliament met in the church's Assembly Hall in Edinburgh, while its own building was being constructed. The Church of Scotland actively supports the work of the Scottish Churches Parliamentary Office in Edinburgh.

Other church agencies include:

- Assembly Arrangements Committee
- Committee on Chaplains to HM Forces
- Church of Scotland Guild
- Committee on Church Art and Architecture (part of the Mission and Discipleship Council)
- Ecumenical Relations Committee
- Stewardship and Finance Department
- General Trustees (a Statutory Corporation, created by the Church of Scotland (Property And Endowments) Act 1925 of the UK Parliamentand responsible for church buildings and stipend endowments. The legal owners of most local church buildings)
- Legal Questions Committee
- Panel on Review and Reform
- Department of the General Assembly
- Safeguarding Service (protection of children and vulnerable adults)

=== Church offices ===
The Church of Scotland Offices are located at 121 George Street, Edinburgh.

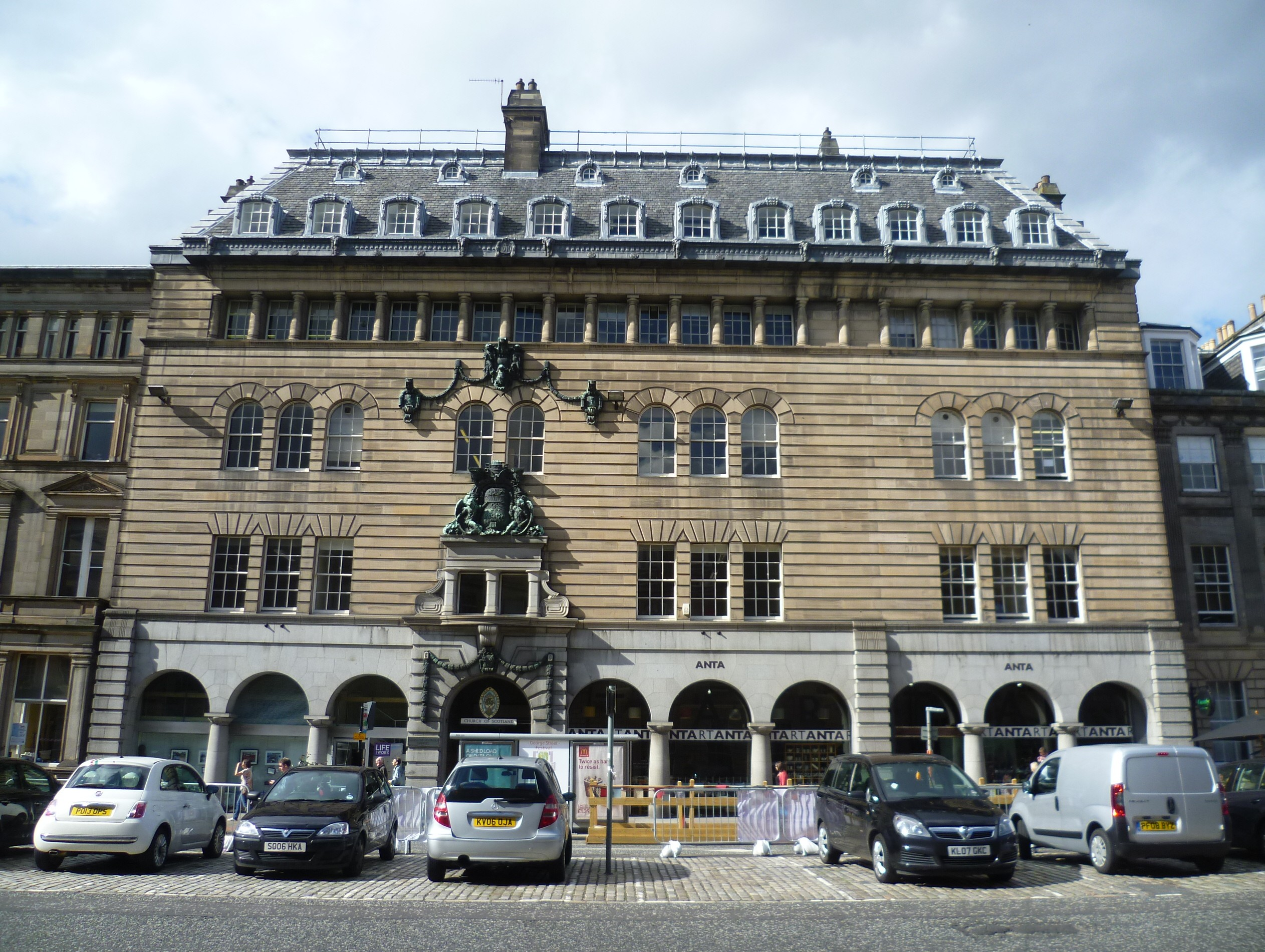
Church of Scotland Offices, George Street, Edinburgh 2013

These imposing buildings—popularly known in church circles as "one-two-one"—were designed in a Scandinavian-influenced style by the architect Sydney Mitchell and built in 1909–1911 for the United Free Church of Scotland. Following the union of the churches in 1929 a matching extension was built in the 1930s.

The offices of the Moderator, Principal Clerk, General Treasurer, Law Department and all the Church councils are located at 121 George Street, with the exception of the Social Care Council (CrossReach). The Principal Clerk to the General Assembly has most recently been Fiona Smith (the first woman to hold the post full-time), who succeeded George Whyte in 2022. The new Principal Clerk will be Rev Alistair May.

== Publications ==
The following publications are useful sources of information about the Church of Scotland.

- Life and Work – the monthly magazine of the Church of Scotland.
- Church of Scotland Yearbook (known as "the red book") – published annually with statistical data on every parish and contact information for every minister.
- Reports to the General Assembly (known as "the blue book") – published annually with reports on the work of the church's departments.
- The Constitution and Laws of the Church of Scotland (known as "the green book") edited by James L. Weatherhead, published 1997 by the Church of Scotland, ISBN 0-86153-246-5 and which has now replaced the venerable
- Practice and Procedure in The Church of Scotland edited by James Taylor Cox, published by The Committee on General Administration, The Church of Scotland, 1976 (sixth edition) ISBN 0-7152-0326-6
- Fasti Ecclesiae Scoticanae – published irregularly since 1866, contains biographies of ministers.
- The First and Second Books of Discipline of 1560 and 1578.
- The Book of Common Order latest version of 1994.

== Bodies to which the Church of Scotland is affiliated ==
- Action of Churches Together in Scotland
- Churches Together in Britain and Ireland
- Conference of European Churches
- Community of Protestant Churches in Europe (Leuenberg Church Fellowship)
- World Council of Churches
- World Communion of Reformed Churches

== See also ==
- Marrow Controversy
- Religion in the United Kingdom
- International Presbytery
- List of Church of Scotland synods and presbyteries
- Ministers and elders in the Church of Scotland
- Moderators and clerks in the Church of Scotland
- List of moderators of the General Assembly of the Church of Scotland
- Lord High Commissioner to the General Assembly of the Church of Scotland
- Bishops in the Church of Scotland
- Iona Community
- Orkney Islands Church of Scotland
- Scottish Churches Parliamentary Office
- Society, Religion and Technology Project
- Protestant Religion and Presbyterian Church Act 1707
