= Ordination of women in the Church of Scotland =

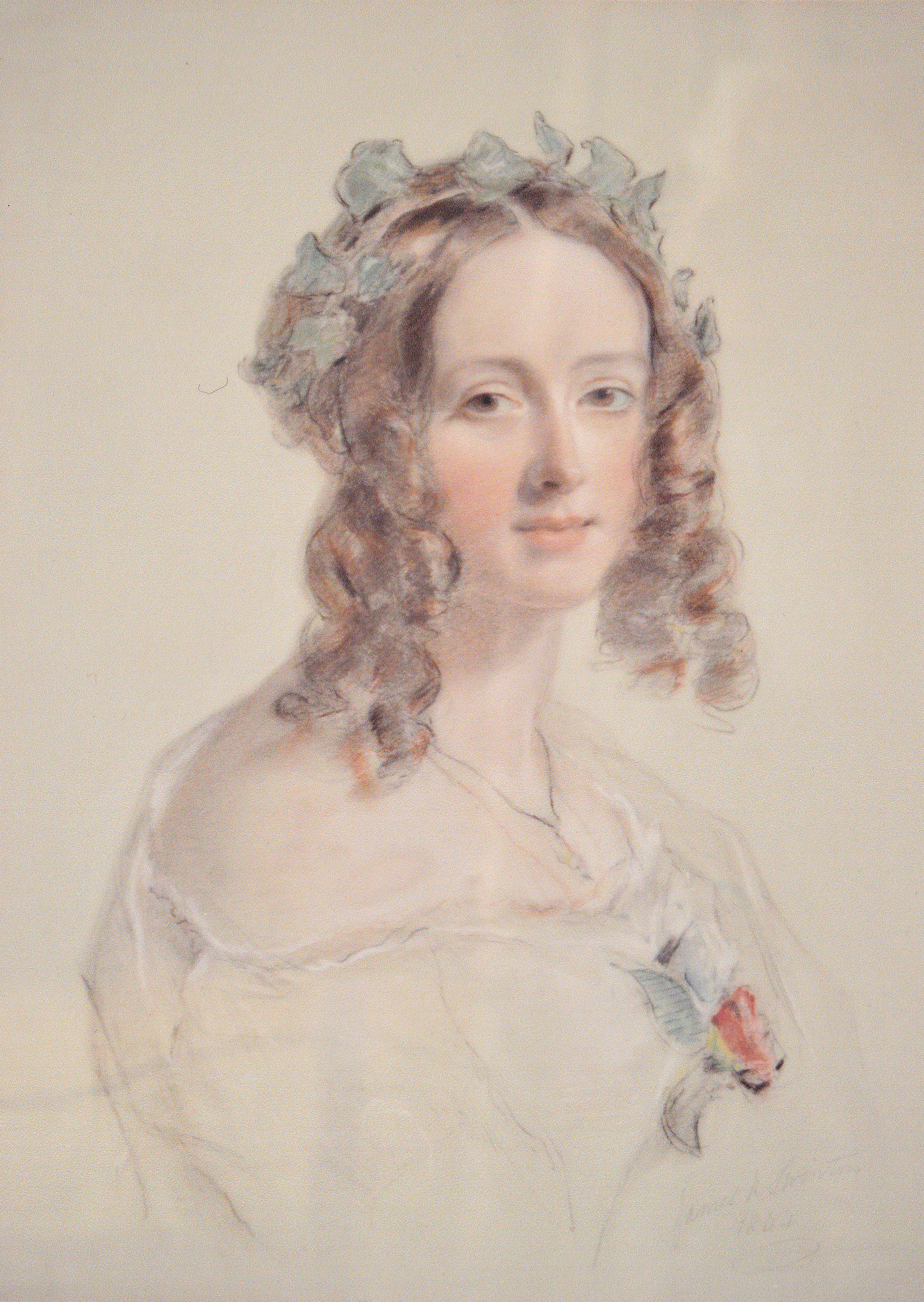
Lady Grisell Baillie (1822–1891), the first deaconess in the Church of Scotland

The Church of Scotland was one of the first national churches to accept the ordination of women. In Presbyterianism, ordination is understood to be an ordinance rather than a sacrament; ministers and elders are ordained; until recently deacons were "commissioned" but now they too are ordained to their office in the Church of Scotland.

== Background ==
Women were commissioned as deacons (or "deaconesses") from 1888, and allowed to preach from 1949. Serious debate on the ordination of women as ministers began when Mary Levison petitioned the General Assembly for ordination in 1963. She was eventually ordained as a Minister of Word and Sacrament in 1978, and in 1991 became the first woman to be appointed as Queen's Chaplain.

In a Presbyterian Church, elders (who together with the minister form the kirk session and fulfill some of the functions of a parish council in other denominations) are ordained for life (ad vitam aut culpam) though in some cases without the laying-on of hands. The minister ("minister of Word and Sacrament", to use the full title) is a "teaching elder", the other kirk session members are "ruling elders", and the difference is understood to lie in the authority of the appointment rather than the spiritual nature of the ordinance. Consequently, the theological arguments for and against the ordination of women as elders were identical to those concerning women ministers, and the two debates ran in parallel and were settled more or less simultaneously. The General Assembly changed its legislation to allow the ordination of women as elders in 1966 and as ministers in 1968.

== First women ==
Lady Grisell Baillie (1822–1891) became the first deaconess in the Church of Scotland on 9 December 1888 in a service conducted by Dr James Mackenzie Allardyce at Bowden Kirk in Bowden, Scottish Borders.

The first woman to be ordained as a minister in the Church of Scotland was the Revd Catherine McConnachie by the Presbytery of Aberdeen in 1969. She served as assistant minister at St George's Tillydrone, in Aberdeen. In 1972 the Revd Euphemia H C. Irvine was the first to be ordained and inducted as a parish minister – at Milton of Campsie Parish Church, near Glasgow. She retired in 1988. In 2014, 204 women were serving ministers in the Church of Scotland within Scotland, representing 25.1% of the active Ministers of Word and Sacrament in the country. There were also 61 women serving as Ministries Development Staff.

Women have also played an increasingly prominent role in the Church's administration. In 1996, the Revd Dr Marjory MacLean – then minister at Stromness, Orkney – was appointed as the first women to be Depute Clerk to the General Assembly and later served as acting Principal Clerk in 2002–2003 (and again in 2009). In 2022, the Rev Fiona Smith, previously minister of Ness Bank, Inverness, became the first woman to serve as full-time Principal Clerk. A number of other senior administrators in the Church are women. Women have also been taking an increasing role in important non-pastoral functions in the church: in 2000 Rosemary Goring became the first female editor of Life and Work.

== Female Moderators of the General Assembly ==
The first female Moderator of the General Assembly was Dr Alison Elliot in 2004, who was also the first elder to hold the post since the 16th century. In May 2007 the Revd Sheilagh M. Kesting became the first female minister to be elected as Moderator of the General Assembly.

=== List of Female Moderators of the General Assembly ===
- 2004 Alison Elliot OBE LLD DD, Elder, Session Clerk at Edinburgh: Greyfriars Tolbooth & Highland Kirk, Associate Secretary of the Centre for Theology & Public Issues at the University of Edinburgh
- 2007 Sheilagh M. Kesting DD, Secretary of the Committee on Ecumenical Relations
- 2013 Lorna Hood DD, Renfrew: North
- 2018 Susan Brown, Dornoch Cathedral
- 2023 Sally Foster-Fulton, Christian Aid Scotland
- 2025 Rosemary Frew, Bowden and Melrose
