= James Weatherhead =

Scottish clergyman (1931-2017)

James Leslie Weatherhead CBE (29 March 1931 – 20 May 2017) was a minister of the Church of Scotland and the moderator of the General Assembly of the Church of Scotland for 1993–1994.

== Background and career ==
James Leslie Weatherhead was born in Dundee on 29 March 1931. He was the grandson of Rev Dr James Weatherhead of St Pauls UF Church in Dundee, and his wife, Margaret McDougall Kilpatrick. His grandfather was Moderator of the General Assembly of the United Free Church of Scotland in 1927.

He was a graduate of the University of Edinburgh, where he was President of the Students' Representative Council.

He was minister at Trinity Church, Rothesay, Isle of Bute until 1969, when he became minister at the Old Parish Church, Montrose. He demitted his charge in 1985 to become Principal Clerk to the General Assembly of the Church of Scotland, a post he held until his retirement in 1996. He was succeeded as Principal Clerk by the Reverend Dr Finlay Macdonald.

During his Moderatorial year he sparked controversy over a New Year sermon he gave in St Giles' Cathedral, Edinburgh, where spoke in support of Dr David Jenkins (the former Bishop of Durham) in his interpretation of the account of the virgin birth of Jesus Christ. In it, he cast doubt on the literal truth of the virgin birth. As a result, in a proposed 10 day visit to Lochcarron and Skye Presbytery in April, he was pre-emptivaly banned from preaching in Kyle of Lochalsh church by then Minister, Rev. Hector Morrison (later to become principal of Highland Theological College). The service where the Moderator preached had to be moved to Kintail Church, 15 miles south. In addition, over 110 Church of Scotland ministers signed a letter of protest at the Crieff Conference as a result of the Moderator's remarks.

He appointed a chaplain to the Queen in 1991 and was appointed a CBE in the 1997 New Year Honours for ecumenical work and public service.

Following the end of his Moderatorial year, his official title was the Very Reverend Dr James Leslie Weatherhead CBE MA LLB DD. He died on 20 May 2017.

== See also ==
- List of moderators of the General Assembly of the Church of Scotland

Religious titles
Preceded by Hugh Wyllie	Moderator of the General Assembly of the Church of Scotland; 1993–1994	Succeeded by James Simpson
