= Alan McDonald (minister) =

Scottish parish minister (1951–2025)

- Born: 6 March 1951; Glasgow, Scotland
- Died: 29 September 2025 (aged 74)
- Citizenship: Parish
- Occupation: Minister

Alan Douglas McDonald (6 March 1951 – 29 September 2025) was a Scottish parish minister who was the moderator of the General Assembly of the Church of Scotland, from the Assembly of May 2006 until May 2007.

== Early life ==
McDonald was born, an only child of Douglas and Ray McDonald, on 6 March 1951 in Glasgow, and was raised in Newton Mearns. He was educated at Glasgow Academy. He had trained initially as a lawyer (gaining an LLB from the University of Strathclyde), training at the Glasgow based law firm, Biggard Lumsden, and then working as a solicitor for Farquharson Craig, in Edinburgh.

== Ministry ==
Through influence at Broom Church Youth Fellowship and Rev. Neilson Peterkin, McDonald decided to enter Church of Scotland ministry.

He studied for the ministry at New College, Edinburgh (BD, MTh), graduating in 1978. During his training, he spend time at Andover Newton Theological Seminary in Boston, USA. He was ordained in 1979. He first served as an assistant minister in Greenside Parish Church, Edinburgh, and was subsequently a community minister in West Pilton, Edinburgh. He served for 15 years in Holburn Central Church, Aberdeen, before being called, in 1998, to the Fife parishes of Cameron and St. Leonards (St Andrews). From there he retired in 2016.

He was involved on the board of Christian Aid, and was a regular contributor to BBC Scotland's Thought for the Day.

In 1993, McDonald was a peace monitor in South Africa during the height of the apartheid riots. He also was a passionate campaigner against nuclear arms, a result of which he was once arrested at Faslane and imprisoned in Maryhill police station.

He was the convener of the General Assembly's Church and Nation committee for four years until May 2004. He was a committed campaigner against sectarianism, and McDonald was the convenor of the committee in 2002 when it published a report admitting that the Kirk was guilty of sectarianism in the past. In his year of Moderator in 2006, he attended a Rangers v Celtic game along with Cardinal Keith O'Brien in an effort to bridge the sectarian divide that often arose during Old Firm matches.

During the General Assembly of 2006 where he was Moderator, he asked John Bell, and others to help lead the daily worship. In his year of Moderator, McDonald visited Elmina Castle on Ghana's Gold Coast, one of the principal points of departure for the slave trade. In addition, he went to the Commonwealth War Memorial cemetery at Tyne Cot, which had been the scene of the battle of Passchendaele during the First World War. There, McDonald led the evening service at the Menin Gate in Ypres. He also, as Moderator, went to Faslane to both meet those working in the station, but also to the Peace Camp outside.

== Personal life ==
He was married to Judith – a GP in Cupar - since July 1975, at Comrie Parish Church. Together they had a son and a daughter: Neil, who has worked as a lawyer, and Ali, who has worked in a women's refuge in Liverpool. He had four grandchildren. His formal title (following the end of his Moderatorial year) was the Very Reverend Dr Alan McDonald.

He was a supporter of Aberdeen Football Club, and a keen golfer. He was also a keen marathon runner and music lover.

Latterly, he lived in Linlithgow and was a member at St Michael's Parish Church, Linlithgow. He had latterly lived with dementia. He died on 29 September 2025, at the age of 74, after a lengthy illness. His funeral will take place at St Michael's Church and Falkirk Crematorium on 24 October 2025.

== See also ==
- List of moderators of the General Assembly of the Church of Scotland

Religious titles
Preceded by David Lacy	Moderator of the General Assembly of the Church of Scotland; 2006–2007	Succeeded by Sheilagh M. Kesting
