= Iain Greenshields =

British Church of Scotland minister

The Very Reverend Iain Greenshields
- Moderator of the General Assembly
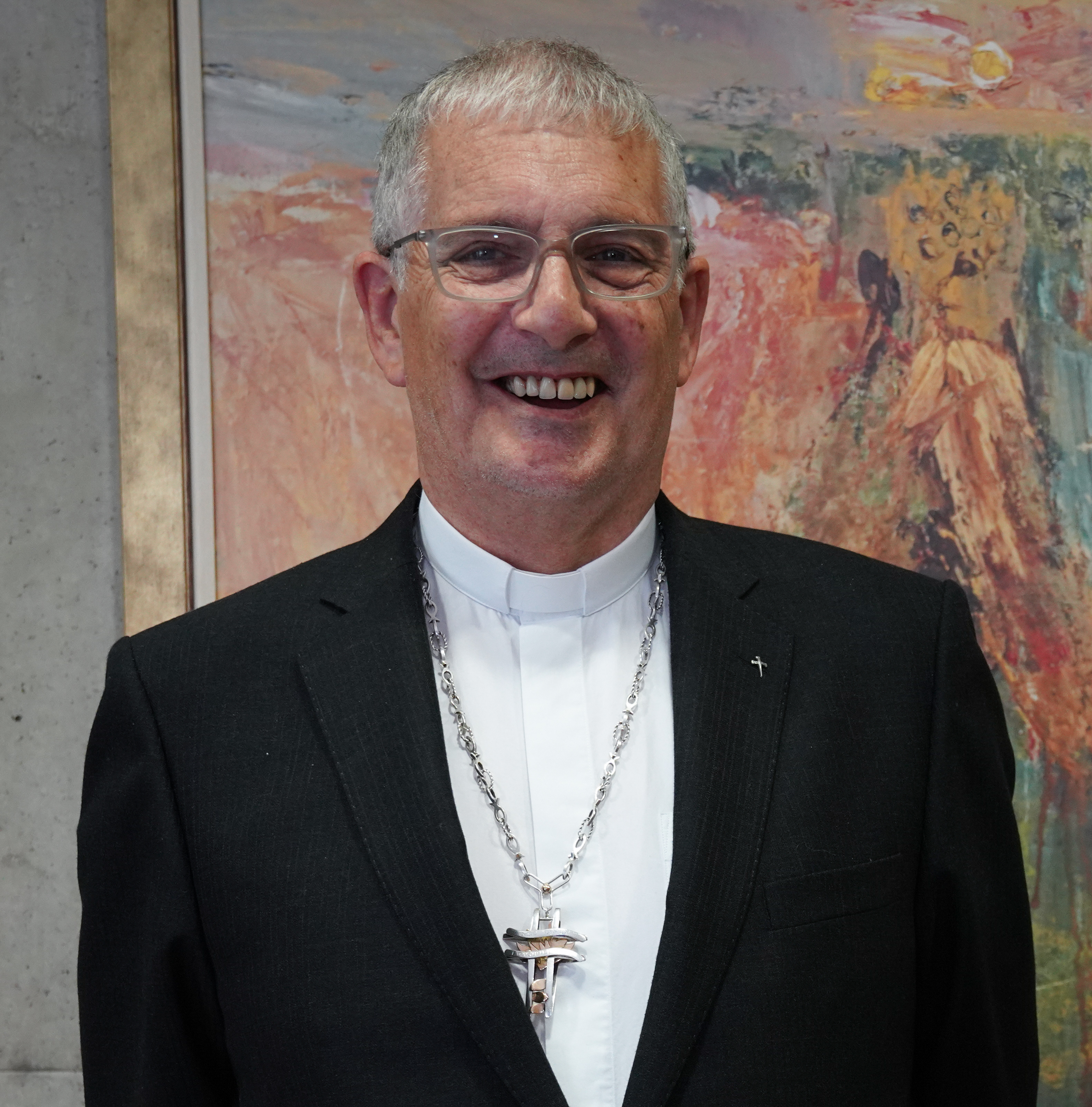
- Greenshields in 2022
- Church: Church of Scotland
- In office: May 2022 to May 2023
- Predecessor: Jim Wallace
- Successor: Sally Foster-Fulton
- Other posts: Minister of St Margaret's Community Church, Dunfermline

Orders
- Ordination: 1 May 1985

Personal details
- Born: 8 March 1954 (age 72)
- Denomination: Presbyterian
- Spouse: Linda Anne Greenshields
- Children: 6 children

Iain MacLeod Greenshields (b. 8 March 1954) is a Church of Scotland minister, who served as Moderator of the General Assembly from 2022 to 2023. He undertook key roles as Moderator for the funeral of Elizabeth II and the Coronation of Charles III. He was ordained in 1984, and was latterly (until 2025) the minister of St Margaret's Community Church in Dunfermline, Fife where he was a minister for 16 years.

== Education and career ==
Greenshileds was born on 8 March 1954 as the son of John Greenshields (a Glasgow police officer) and Catherine Greenshields (nee. Macleod). Greenshields grew up in Glasgow and studied theology at the University of Glasgow.

He studied at the University of Cambridge in 1985 for a DRS.

He was licensed by the Presbytery of Glasgow on 1 June 1984. He was an assistant at Glasgow Broomhill between 1983 and 1984.

He was ordained into the charge of Cranhill on 1 May 1985. On 2 May 1993, he moved on to Larkhall, Lanarkshire to become minister of St Machan's Church. During this time, he became involved with ministry to offenders, as part-time chaplain of Shotts prison and the Longriggend Young Offenders Institute. He was also a part-time chaplain to Hairmyres Hospital in East Kilbride. He moved to Kensaleyre in 2002, where he remained until 2007. It was then that he transferred to St Margaret's Community Church of Dunfermline. He retired from this role in 2025.

In May 2023, he took part in the coronation of Charles III and Camilla, presenting a Bible to the King.

== Political views ==
Greenshields has publicly attacked the deportation policies of the United Kingdom. He has a keen interest in addiction issues, arguing that drug possession should be decriminalized. He is an ambassador for Epilepsy Scotland, having lived with the condition himself for nearly 65 years. He is a supporter of Society for the Protection of Unborn Children (SPUC), Tearfund and The Barnabas Trust. His views politically are social democratic.

== Bibliography ==
- From the Heart (Moorley's, 1987)
- Treasure in Unsure Places (Moorley’s, 1997)
- Prayer (Moorley’s, 1997)
- In Control of the World (Moorley’s, 1997)

== Family life ==
Greenshields and his wife have six children, three of whom are biological (Alistair, Ross and Caitlin), three of whom have been adopted from China: their names are Eilidh, Siona, and Siusaidh.

Religious titles
Preceded by Jim Wallace, Baron Wallace of Tankerness	Moderator of the General Assembly of the Church of Scotland; 2022-2023	Succeeded by Sally Foster-Fulton
