= Fiona Smith (Church of Scotland) =

Principal Clerk of the General Assembly of the Church of Scotland

Rev. Fiona E. Smith
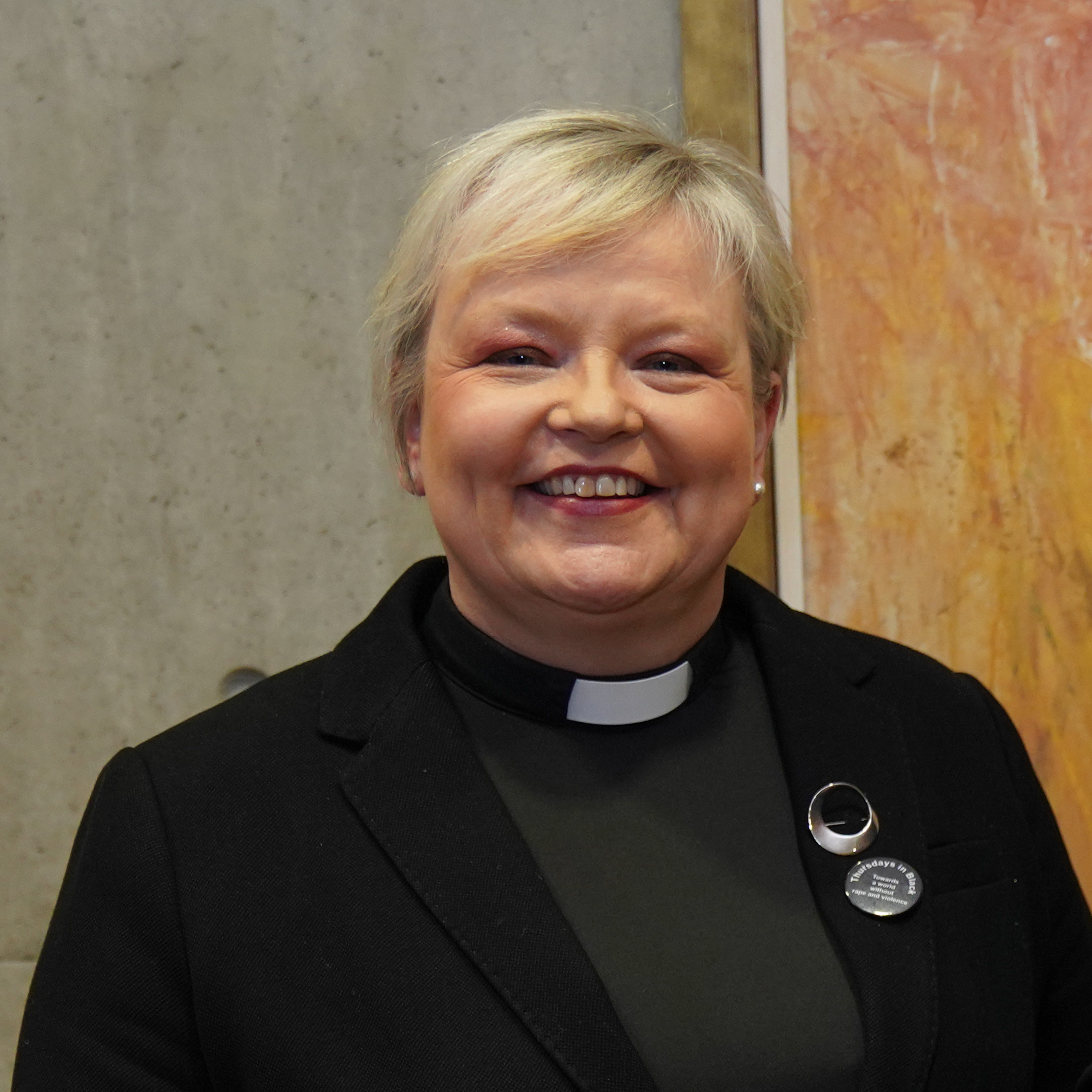
- Smith in 2025
- Born: c.1970
- Occupations: Lawyer, church minister
- Employer: Church of Scotland
- Known for: Principal Clerk of the General Assembly of the Church of Scotland (2022-2025)
- Successor: Rev. Dr. Alistair May

Reverend Fiona E. Smith (born c.1970) became the Principal Clerk of the General Assembly of the Church of Scotland in 2022. She was possibly the fortieth person to hold that role since 1572 and the first woman.

== Life ==
Smith was born around 1970.

She had worked as a lawyer in London and in 2010 she was ordained and inducted as the minister of Inverness's Ness Bank Church. She gave her last service there in April 2022. She was succeeded as minister at Ness Bank, in 2024, by the Rev. Stuart Smith, formerly of Gairloch and Dundonnell Parish Church.

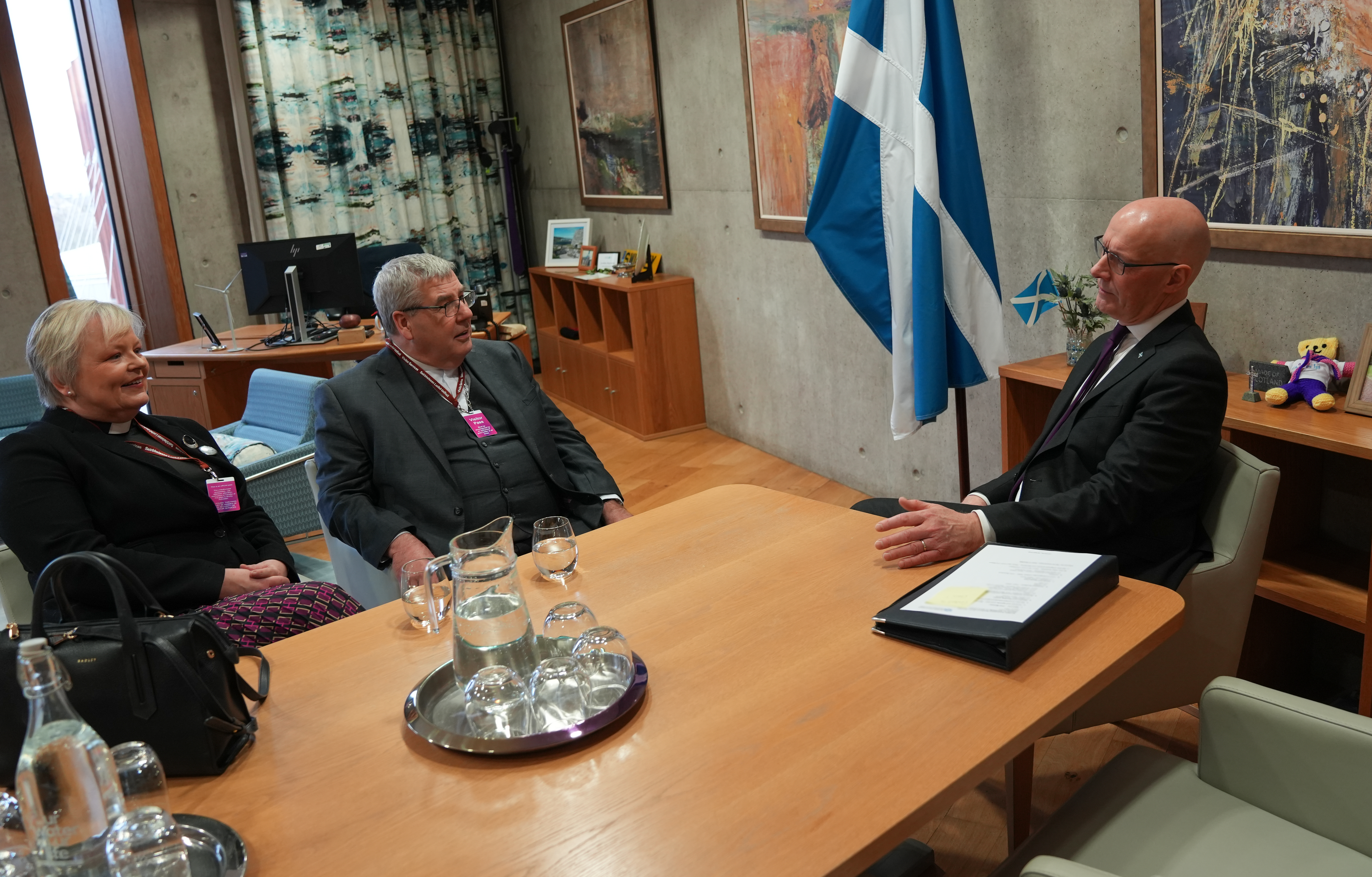
Smith, Shaw Paterson and First Minister John Swinney

Smith became the Principal Clerk of the General Assembly of the Church of Scotland in 2022. She was the first woman to hold the office, succeeding Rev Dr George Whyte who had held the post since 2017. He was one of about forty men who have held the position since 1572.

The Principal Clerk's role is to be an adviser on church law and to support the annually elected moderator. She also advises on courses and education for the church. When the 2024 moderator, Shaw Paterson, and the 2025 moderator Rosemary Frew went to meet Scotland's First Minister, John Swinney, they were accompanied by the Principal Clerk.

She is a President of the Council of Christians and Jews. The CCJ has a number of Presidents who in 2024 were the Archbishop of Canterbury Cardinal Archbishop of Westminster, the Archbishop of Thyateira and Great Britain, the Chief Rabbi of the United Hebrew Congregations of the Commonwealth, the Moderator of the Free Churches, the Spiritual Head, Spanish and Portuguese Jews’ Congregation, Chief Executive, Liberal Judaism and Smith. In 2024, the Scottish government organised an inaugural Faith and Belief Conference and Smith addressed the conference on behalf of the CCJ.

Smith welcomed the appointment of Lady Elish Angiolini as Lord High Commissioner to the 2025 General Assembly. The new moderator was Rosemary Frew.

In September 2025, she was one of the signatories of an open letter complaining about the misuse of the symbol of the cross. The letter cited its use in racist and anti-Muslim rallies. The letter was also signed by over thirty others including Rowan Williams and the Rev Lucy Winkett.

On 17 October 2025, she resigned from the role of Clerk stating: "It has been an honour and privilege to serve the Church as Principal Clerk over the last years. After reflection I have decided, with some sadness, that due to recent health concerns now is the right time for me to step away. I want to extend my deepest gratitude to the exemplary team who have supported me throughout my time in the role." A temporary clerk was appointed, the Rev. Dr John McPake. He continued in this role during the 2026 General Assembly as he'd been involved in the preparations. On the final day of the General Assembly, Monday 18th May 2026, the Rev. Dr. Alistair May was appointed as full time Clerk of the General Assembly to succeed Fiona Smith.

She now lives in Saline, Fife.
