= William Macmillan (minister) =

Minister of the Church of Scotland (1927–2002)

William B. R. Macmillan (3 July 1927 – 16 October 2002) was a minister of the Church of Scotland. He was Moderator of the General Assembly of the Church of Scotland in 1991.

== Background and career ==
William Boyd Robertson Macmillan (better known as Bill) was born in Keith, Moray in 1927. He was a graduate of the University of Aberdeen in arts and divinity; he also did National Service in the Royal Navy.

His first charge was at St Andrew's Church, Bo'ness (1955-1960), followed by Fyvie Parish Church, Aberdeenshire (1960-1967), then Bearsden South Parish Church (1967-1978).

He was minister of Dundee Parish Church (St Mary's) from 1978 until his retirement in 1993. During this time he came to national prominence in the Church of Scotland, as Convener of the Business Committee of the General Assembly and Convener of the Church of Scotland's Board of Practice and Procedure. He was appointed a Chaplain to the Queen (1988), received an honorary Doctorate in Law from the University of Dundee (1990), an honorary Doctorate of Divinity from the University of Aberdeen (1991) and served as Moderator of the General Assembly in 1991.

Following his Moderatorial year, his title was the Very Reverend Dr William B. R. Macmillan LLD DD.

== See also ==
- List of moderators of the General Assembly of the Church of Scotland

Religious titles
Preceded by Robert Davidson	Moderator of the General Assembly of the Church of Scotland; 1991–1992	Succeeded by Hugh Wyllie
