= Hugh Wyllie =

Scottish Presbyterian minister (1934–2023)

The Very Reverend Hugh Wyllie
- Moderator of the General Assembly
- Church: Church of Scotland
- In office: May 1992 to May 1993
- Predecessor: William Macmillan
- Successor: James Weatherhead
- Other post: Minister of Hamilton Old Parish Church (1981 to 2000)

Orders
- Ordination: 1962

Personal details
- Born: 11 October 1934
- Died: 31 October 2023 (aged 89)
- Denomination: Presbyterianism
- Education: Trinity College, Glasgow

Hugh Rutherford Wyllie (11 October 1934 – 31 October 2023) was a Scottish Presbyterian minister. From 1992 to 1993, he served as Moderator of the General Assembly of the Church of Scotland.

== Early life and education ==
Hugh Rutherford Wyllie was born on 11 October 1934 to Hugh McPhee Wyllie and Elizabeth Buchanan. He was educated at Shawlands Academy and Hutchesons' Boys' Grammar School; both in Glasgow, Scotland. After completing his schooling, he worked for the Union Bank of Scotland from 1951 to 1953, achieving Membership of the Chartered Institute of Bankers in Scotland (MCIBS).

From 1953 to 1955, Wyllie undertook his national service in the Royal Air Force. He specialised as an air radar mechanic. Because he had accrued extra hours, he was demobbed two days before his two years of compulsory service were due to be completed. Two days later, on what should have been his last day of service, the plane he had served on crashed into the sea, killing all those on board.

== Ordained ministry ==
Wyllie trained for ordained ministry at Trinity College, Glasgow, and studied theology at the University of Glasgow, graduating with an undergraduate Master of Arts (MA Hons) degree. He was ordained a Minister within the Church of Scotland in December 1962. He also served as Minister of Dunbeth Church, Coatbridge from 1965 to 1972, of Cathcart South Church, Glasgow from 1972 to 1981, and of the Old Parish Church, Hamilton from 1981 to 2000. During his time of ministry at Hamilton Old, one of his probationers was another future moderator, 2024 moderator, Shaw Paterson.

During his ministry, he took on various roles, including becoming Moderator of the Presbytery of Hamilton (1989-90); Convenor of the General Assembly Stewardship and Budget Committee (1978-83), Stewardship and Finance Board (1983-86) and Assembly Council (1987-91).

He was elected Moderator of the General Assembly of the Church of Scotland in May 1992, serving until the following May, when James Weatherhead took up the role. Upon becoming Moderator, he was styled "The Right Reverend Hugh Wyllie." When his year of being Moderator had finished, he was styled "The Very Reverend Hugh Wyllie".

== Death ==
Hugh Wyllie died on 31 October 2023, at the age of 89. He was survived by his wife, Eileen; his daughters, Hazel and Helen; and his four grandchildren, David, Iain, Emma and Alexander

Religious titles
Preceded by William Macmillan	Moderator of the General Assembly of the Church of Scotland; 1992–1993	Succeeded by James Weatherhead
