= Shaw Paterson =

Church of Scotland minister (born 1964)

The Very Reverend Dr Shaw Paterson
- Moderator of the General Assembly
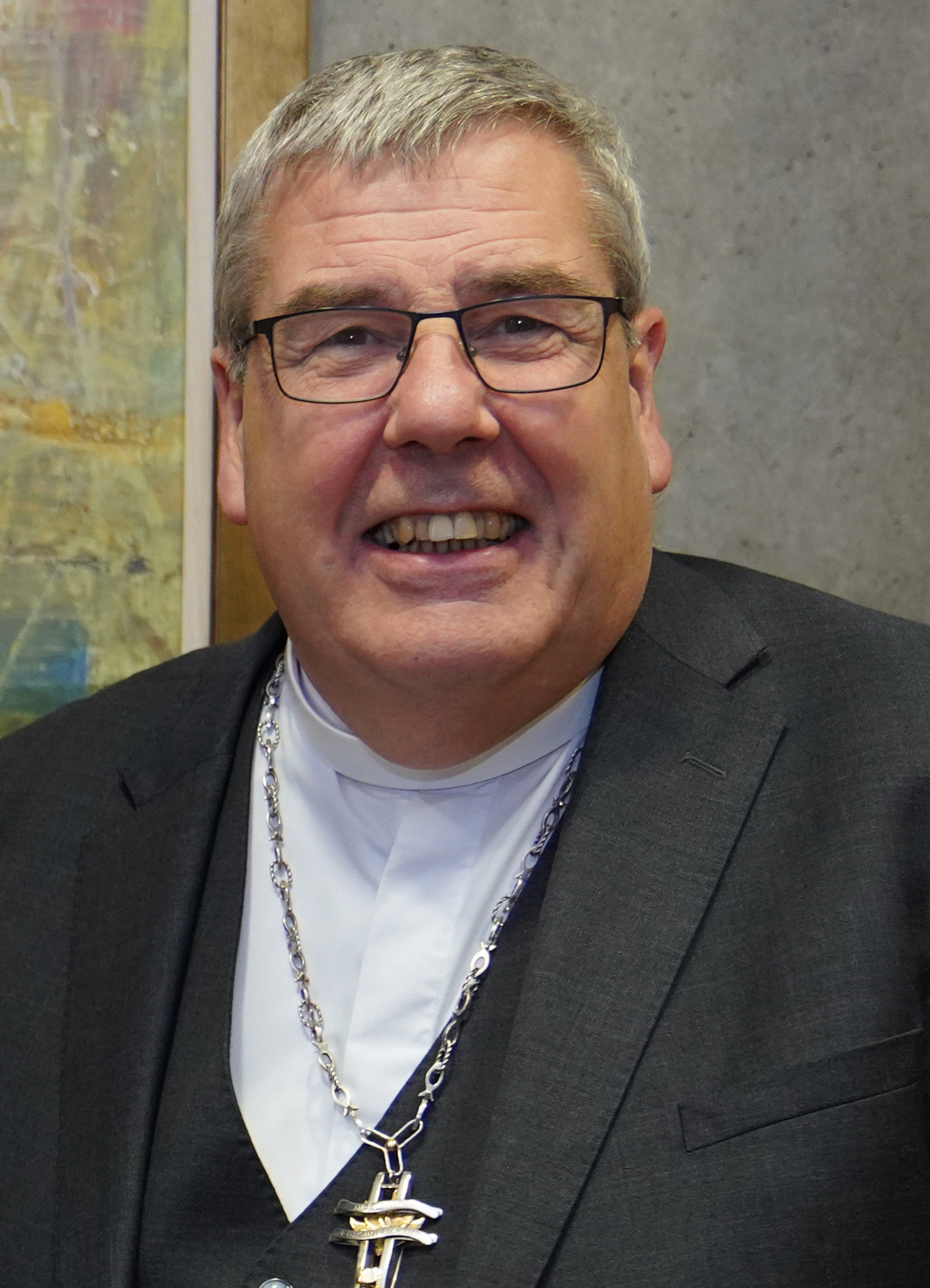
- Paterson in 2024
- Church: Church of Scotland
- In office: May 2024–May 2025
- Predecessor: Sally Foster-Fulton
- Successor: Rosemary Frew
- Other post: Minister of Strathaven: Trinity

Orders
- Ordination: 1991

Personal details
- Born: Shaw James Paterson; September 1964 (age 61) Holytown, North Lanarkshire, Scotland
- Denomination: Presbyterian
- Residence: Strathaven
- Spouse: Christine
- Children: 3
- Education: University of Glasgow

Shaw James Paterson (born 13 September 1964) is a minister of the Church of Scotland, serving as Moderator of the General Assembly of the Church of Scotland 18 May 2024 – May 2025 and succeeding Sally Foster-Fulton.

Originally from Holytown, Paterson is a graduate of the University of Glasgow. He has served as minister of Strathaven Trinity Parish Church in Strathaven, South Lanarkshire, since 1991.

== Early life and education ==
Shaw was born in on 3 September 1964 at Bellshill, the youngest of three boys born to James (Jim) and Anne Paterson. He was brought up in Holytown in North Lanarkshire.

From an early age, church was a regular part of his life. A forebear of his, a master stonemason, was part of the team which constructed the Church of Scotland Parish Church in Holytown. In the church he was brought up in, his father served as an elder and a leader within the Boys' Brigade company.

During his schooling days at Bellshill Academy, Shaw was not encouraged to attend university - partially as a result of his accent - despite a passion for science. Instead, he was expected to become a bricklayer. However, after some encouragement from his dad, Shaw became a science student at Glasgow University, graduating with the first of four degrees he would complete - including a later doctorate. His degree was in biology, namely in plant physiology. Through university, he supported his income through taking on a number of different jobs, including as a tiler.

== Ministry ==
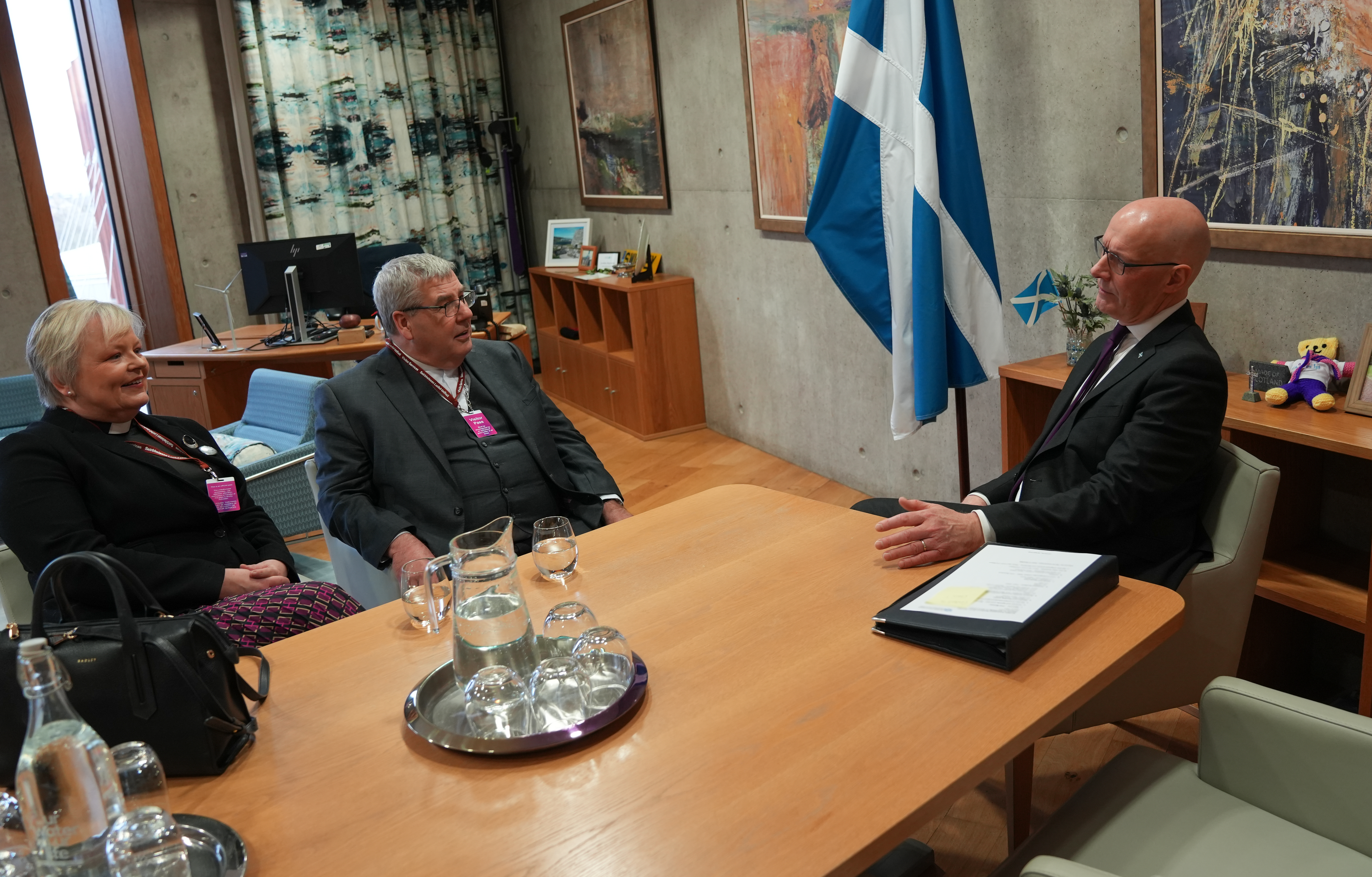
Fiona Smith, Shaw Paterson and First Minister John Swinney meeting in 2024

He took up his divinity degree in the autumn of September 1987 at Glasgow University, just two weeks after getting married. His student placements for ministry were at the churches of: Motherwell: Dalziel, Hamilton: Gilmour and Whitehill, as well as East Kilbride: West. He graduated in 1990, and was licensed on 26 June 1990 by the then Presbytery of Hamilton, and completed his probationary year at Hamilton Old by future General Assembly Moderator, Hugh Wyllie.

Shortly after his probationary year, he was called to be minister at Strathaven: Rankin linked with Chapelton. He was ordained to the charge on 29 August 1991. The churches were part of a four way union in 2018 to form Strathaven: Trinity Church. This has been his only charge.

As part of his ministry, he has set up a memory group for those with memory issues, a lunchtime club for school pupils, and has a passion for helping people through the use of foodbanks.

He served for 10 years as Presbytery Clerk of Hamilton Presbytery. He also served, jointly, as the first moderator of the newly formed Forth Valley and Clydesdale Presbytery.

As part of his year of being Moderator, he preached at St Giles Cathedral on the Sunday during General Assembly Week, which happened to be Pentecost. The service was attended by that year's Lord High Commissioner, Prince Edward, the Duke of Edinburgh. The theme of his year of serving as Moderator is 'Building Together.'

In 2024 he visited Malawi helping to celebrate the centenary of the Church of Central Africa Presbyterian. He visited Thondwe in Malawi to open a replaced bridge funded by the twinned Scottish community of Innerleithen, Traquair and Walkerburn.

== Family life ==
Paterson has been married to Christine since 4 September 1987. Christine is a senior member of the community nursing team. They were married at the University of Glasgow Memorial Chapel. They have been together since they were 14 years old. He is a father of three children.

Religious titles
Preceded by Sally Foster-Fulton	Moderator of the General Assembly of the Church of Scotland; 2024–2025	Incumbent
