= Sally Foster-Fulton =

Moderator of the General Assembly of the Church of Scotland

The Very Reverend Sally Foster-Fulton
- Moderator of the General Assembly
- Church: Church of Scotland
- In office: May 2023 to May 2024
- Predecessor: Iain Greenshields
- Successor: Dr Shaw J. Paterson
- Other posts: Associate Minister of Dunblane Cathedral (2007–2017); Convenor of the Church and Society Council of the Church of Scotland (2012–2016)

Orders
- Ordination: 1999

Personal details
- Born: South Carolina, U.S.
- Denomination: Presbyterian
- Residence: Glasgow, Scotland
- Spouse: Stuart Fulton
- Children: 2 daughters

Sally Foster-Fulton is a Church of Scotland minister, who was Moderator of the General Assembly of the Church of Scotland from May 2023 to May 2024.

== Early life ==
Foster-Fulton was born and raised in South Carolina, United States. She studied at Presbyterian College, Columbia Theological Seminary, and Trinity College, Glasgow. She was ordained as a Church of Scotland minister in 1999. She was minister of Camelon Irving Parish Church for four years, before serving as co-pastor of the PCUSA congregation in Seneca, South Carolina, alongside her husband, Stuart Fulton.

== Church of Scotland ==
After returning to Scotland in 2007, Foster-Fulton became associate minister at Dunblane Cathedral, where she served for ten years. From 2012 to 2016 she was convenor of the Church and Society Council of the Church of Scotland. Foster-Fulton took up a role with Christian Aid in 2016, becoming the Head of Christian Aid Scotland. Upon returning to work for the charity after her year as Moderator of the General Assembly, she now works as the UK and Global Church Ambassador for Christian Aid Scotland.

She was named as the Church of Scotland's next Moderator in October 2022, and installed in office in May 2023 at the Church's annual General Assembly, succeeding Rev Iain Greenshields in the process. She described herself as "beyond humbled, inexpressibly honoured and more than a wee bit excited" to be taking up the role.

On 5 July 2023, and in her role as Moderator of the Church of Scotland, Foster-Fulton gave a homily at the Service of Thanksgiving and Dedication held at Edinburgh's St Giles' Cathedral for the Presentation of the Royal Honours of Scotland to King Charles III.

In May 2024 she was succeeded by Dr Shaw Paterson.

She has held a number of chaplaincy positions, including being chaplain at Falkirk and District Royal Infirmary and The Royal National Scottish Hospital in Larbert.

== Personal life ==
Foster-Fulton is married to Stuart Fulton, himself a Church of Scotland minister - though retired in 2022 from Newlands South Church of Scotland. The couple live in Falkirk and have two adult daughters.

Religious titles
Preceded by Iain Greenshields	Moderator of the General Assembly of the Church of Scotland; 2023–2024	Succeeded by Shaw Paterson
