= David Paul (minister) =

Scottish minister and botanist

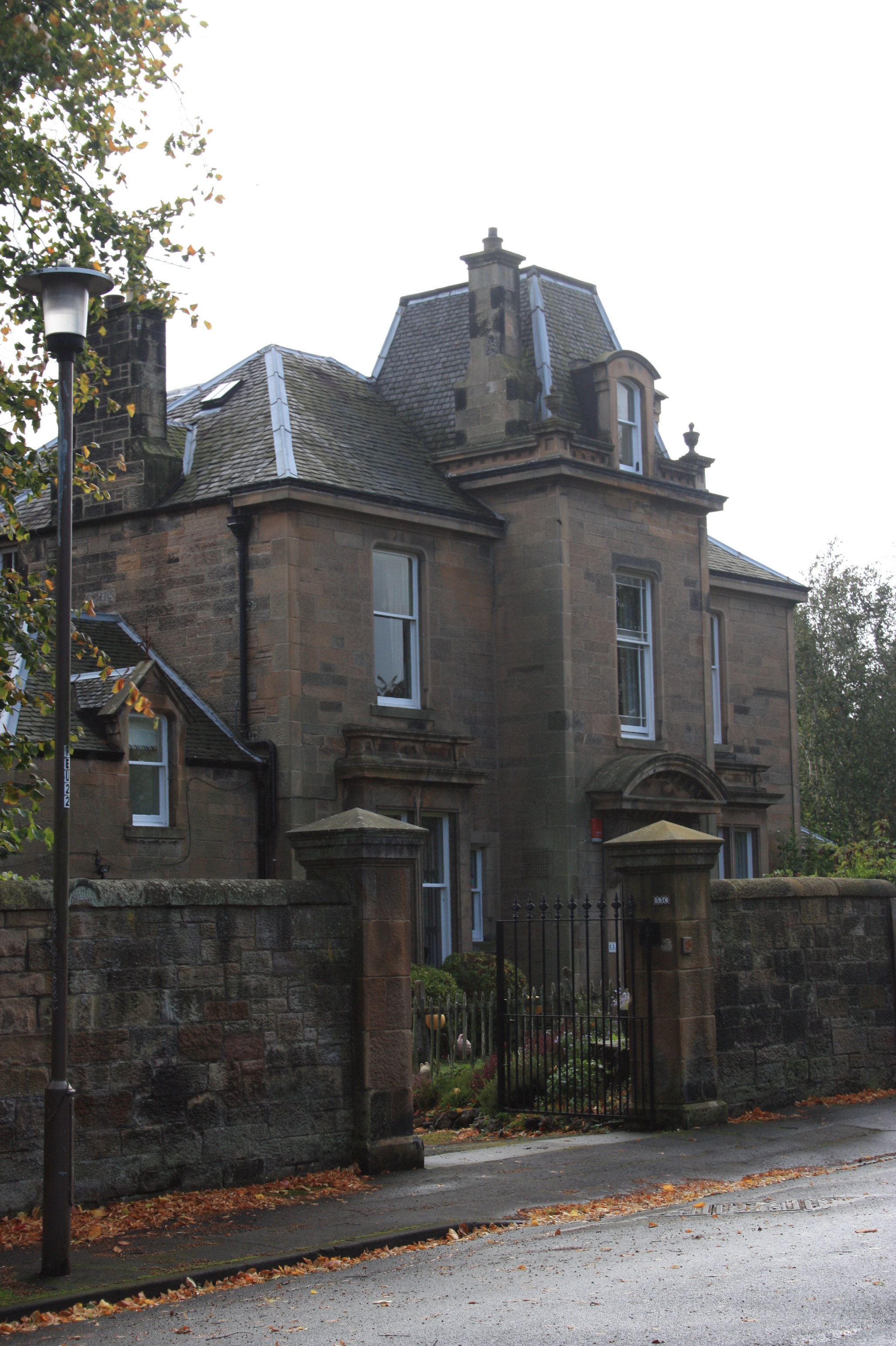
53 Fountainhall Road, Edinburgh

David Paul FLS (1845–1929) was a Scottish minister and botanist who served as Moderator of the General Assembly of the Church of Scotland in 1915.

== Life ==
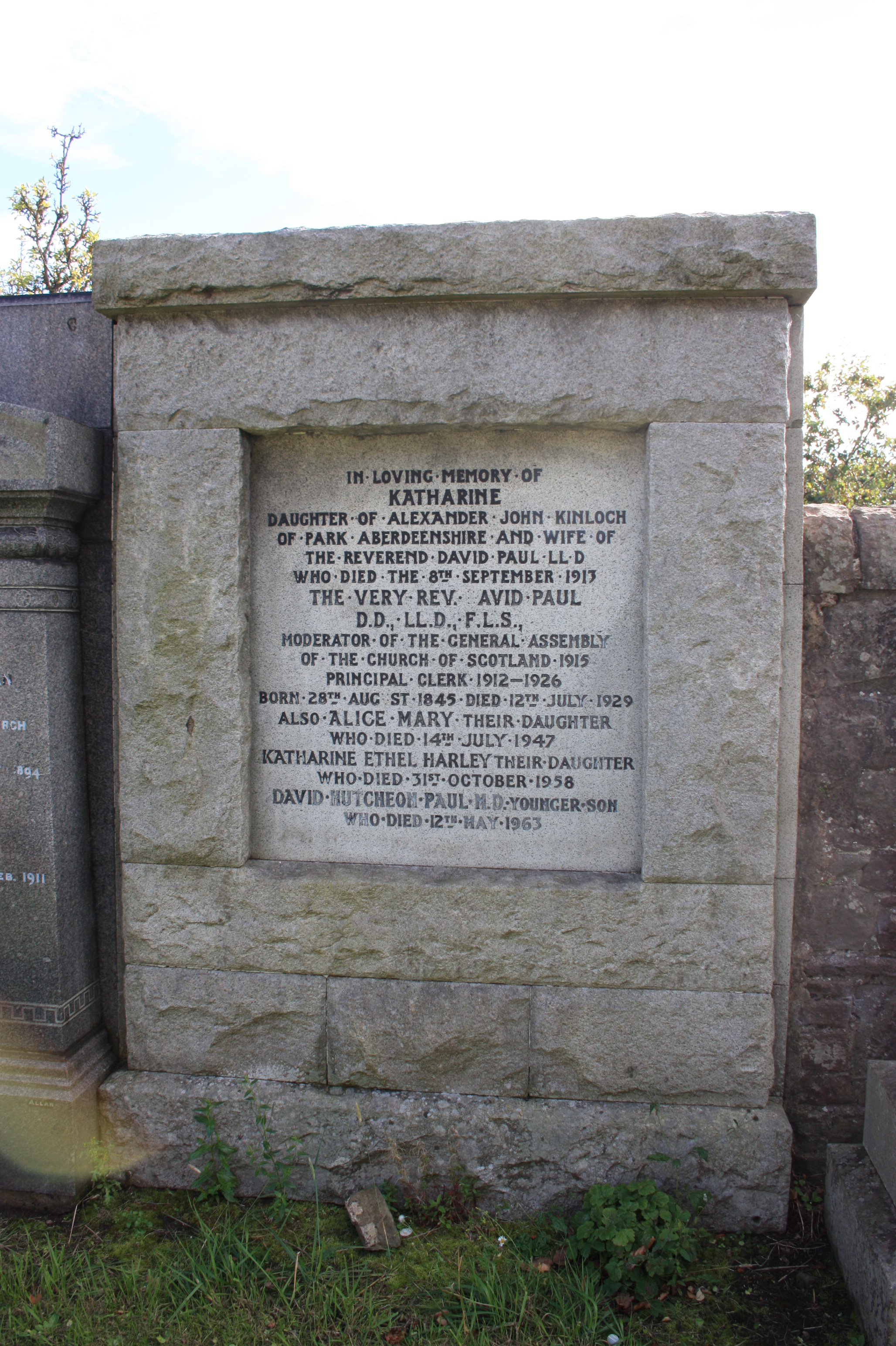
The grave of Very Rev David Paul, Grange Cemetery, Edinburgh

David Paul was born on 28 August 1845 in Banchory in Aberdeenshire, the son of Rev. Dr. William Paul DD minister of Banchory-Devenick and his wife, Jessy Stewart.

He was educated at Banchory-Devenick school then studied first at Aberdeen University then Edinburgh University.

Paul was licensed to preach as a Church of Scotland minister by the Presbytery of Aberdeen 1868 and became assistant in Udny. In 1869 he took brief charge of the Scots Church in the east of Dresden in Germany before returning to Scotland and being ordained as minister of Morebattle later in the same year. He transferred to Roxburgh in 1876.

From 1896, Paul was minister of the Robertson Memorial Church in the Grange (renamed Grange Church in 1929 and now known as Marchmont-St Giles) replacing Rev. William Lyon Riach. He lived at 53 Fountainhall Road, a large villa in the Grange.

From 1899 to 1901 he was President of the Botanical Society of Edinburgh. He delivered his penultimate presidential address on 8 November 1900 and his outgoing presidential address on 14 November 1901.

He was Principal Clerk of the General Assembly of the Church of Scotland from 1912 to 1926, serving as Moderator in 1915.

Paul died on 12 July 1929. He is buried, with his family, in Grange Cemetery in south Edinburgh close to his home and his church. The grave lies on the southern boundary wall, towards the south-east corner wall.

== Family ==
In 1876 he was married to Katharine Kinloch, daughter of Alexander John Kinloch of Park and Altries. They had several children:

- Alexander John Kinloch Paul (born 1877)
- Katherine Ethel Paul (born 1878)
- Alice Mary Paul (born 1880)
- David Hutcheon Paul (born 1883)
- George Morison Paul (born 1884)
