= Dr. Challoner's =

Dr. Challoners may refer to one of the following schools:

- Dr Challoner's Grammar School – for boys with a co-educational Sixth Form
- Dr Challoner's High School – for girls
