= David Lunan =

David Ward Lunan is a Church of Scotland minister. On 30 October 2007 he was nominated to be the Moderator of the General Assembly of the Church of Scotland for 2008–9, formally being elected as Moderator on the first day of the Assembly (15 May 2008).

He was born in London, but has lived most of his life in Scotland. He was brought up in Cambuslang, Lanarkshire and educated at the High School of Glasgow and the University of Glasgow. In 1967 he was the Chair of the Scottish Christian Youth Assembly and also ran a youth club in Gorbals. Following graduation in 1968 he attended Princeton Theological Seminary, New Jersey, USA and served at the First Presbyterian Church, Philadelphia, as Peter Marshall Scholar.

From 1969 until 1975 he was a youth club leader and Assistant Minister, working in Glasgow for the Trinity College Missionary Society. He was ordained to the ministry in December 1970.

In 1975 he was called to St Andrew's Lhanbryde Church, near Elgin, Moray. He was Moderator of the Presbytery of Moray in 1985-86 and also a part-time hospital chaplain in Elgin.

In 1987 became minister at Renfield St Stephen's Church in the city centre of Glasgow. He was Moderator of the Presbytery of Glasgow in 2000–01. From 2002 until 2008 he was Clerk to the Presbytery of Glasgow. He has also served the Church of Scotland at a wider level, including serving on the Assembly Council and the Board of Social Responsibility. He has also taken part in study tours with Christian Aid to the Philippines, Malawi and South Africa. He was Turnbull Trust preacher at Scots' Church, Melbourne November 2010 to January 2011. Mr Lunan and his wife, Maggie, have four adult sons.

== See also ==
- List of moderators of the General Assembly of the Church of Scotland

Religious titles
| Preceded by Sheilagh M. Kesting | Moderator of the General Assembly of the Church of Scotland; 2008–2009 | Succeeded by William C. Hewitt |
