= Partick South Parish Church =

Partick South Church
- Partick South Parish Church
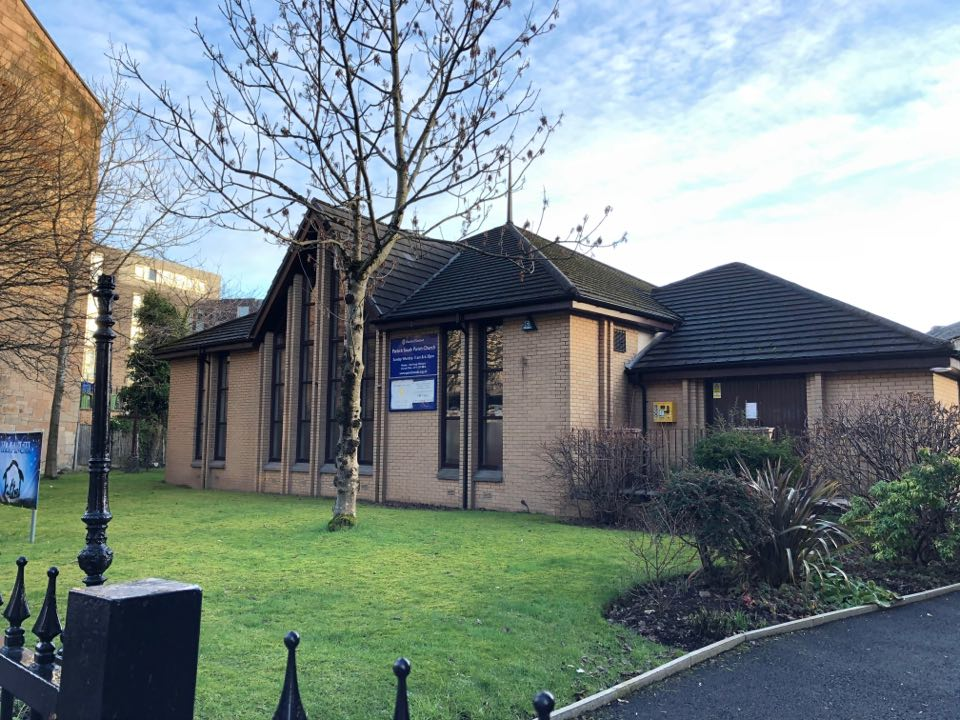
- Partick South Church
- 55°52′14″N 4°18′14″W
- Location: Glasgow
- Country: Scotland
- Denomination: Church of Scotland
- Website: Church Website

History
- Status: Active

Architecture
- Functional status: Parish church
- Style: Modern
- Years built: 1988

Administration
- Parish: Partick

Partick South Church is Parish church of the Church of Scotland, located in the Partick area of Glasgow, Scotland.

== History of the Building ==
The current church building located in Dumbarton Road, was built in 1988 in a modern contemporary style. The current church is built on the site of the original parish church, originally constructed in 1865 for the Partick West United Presbyterian congregation, later renamed Newton Place United Presbyterian. The church was built in the Neo-Gothic style, designed by Gustavus Hamilton O'Donoghue. The church was demolished in 1986.

== History of the Congregation ==
The original congregation was founded as the Newton Place Relief Church in 1823 as a parish of the Relief Church. When the Relief Church united with other churches to form the United Presbyterian Church in 1947, the congregation was renamed Partick West United Presbyterian Church. In 1867 the name was changed again, to Newton Place United Presbyterian Church. In 1900, with further unions between church denominations, the congregation became a parish of the United Free Church of Scotland, renamed Newton Place United Free Church. In 1929, the congregation officially joined the established Church of Scotland, becoming Newton Place Parish Church.

In 1977, the Presbytery of Glasgow decided to merge three congregations in the Partick area to form Partick South, whilst retaining the use of the Newton Place building. The union took place in 1978, and these included the congregations of Newton Place, Partick Anderson and Hamilton Crescent.

The Moderator of the General Assembly of the Church of Scotland in May 2026, the Rev Gordon Kennedy, grew up in the congregation.
