= Rosemary Frew =

Moderator of the Church of Scotland

The Right Reverend Dr Rosemary Frew
- Moderator of the General Assembly
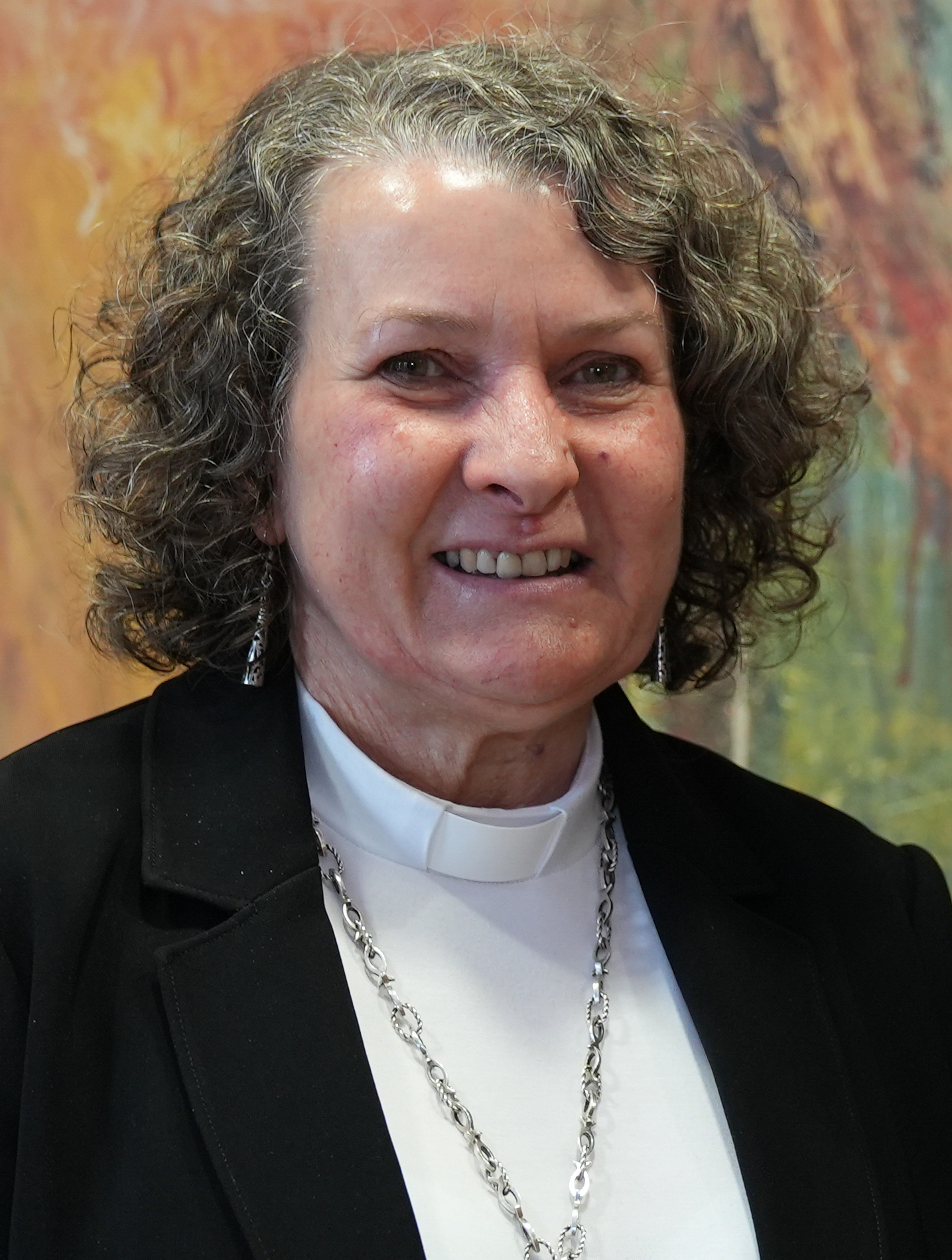
- Frew in 2025
- Church: Church of Scotland
- In office: May 2025–May 2026
- Predecessor: Shaw Paterson
- Other post: Minister of Largo: Trinity

Orders
- Ordination: 4 May 1988

Personal details
- Born: 2 October 1961 (age 64) Clarkston, East Renfrewshire, Scotland
- Denomination: Presbyterian
- Spouse: Dave Frew
- Children: 2
- Education: New College, Edinburgh

Rosemary Frew (born 2 October 1961) is a minister of the Church of Scotland, who became the Moderator of the General Assembly of the Church of Scotland in May 2025.

== Early life ==
Frew was born on 2 October 1961 to Robert Ramsay Bone and Mary Donald. She was raised in Clarkston, Glasgow.

She was educated at Williamwood Junior High, Eastwood Senior High and Linlithgow Academy (1973-1979). She studied at the University of Edinburgh between 1979-82 for an MA, and then 1983-1986 for a BD.

== Career ==
=== Church of Scotland ===
She was licensed by the Presbytery of West Lothian on 29 June 1986. At first, she was an assistant at Markinch (1986-1987).

She was ordained in the Church of Scotland in 4 May 1988, originally serving Largo and Newburn with Largo: St David's. After 17 years in Largo, she served in Abbotshall Parish Church in Kirkcaldy. Since March 2017, she has served as the Minister for the parish of Bowden and Melrose in the Scottish Borders.

Within the denomination, she has been Presbytery Clerk of the former Kirkcaldy Presbytery. In 2019, Frew became convener of the Ministries Council then the first convener of the Faith Nurture Forum.

On 19 December 2022, she conducted the funeral of Doddie Weir in Melrose Parish Church.

=== Moderator of Church of Scotland ===
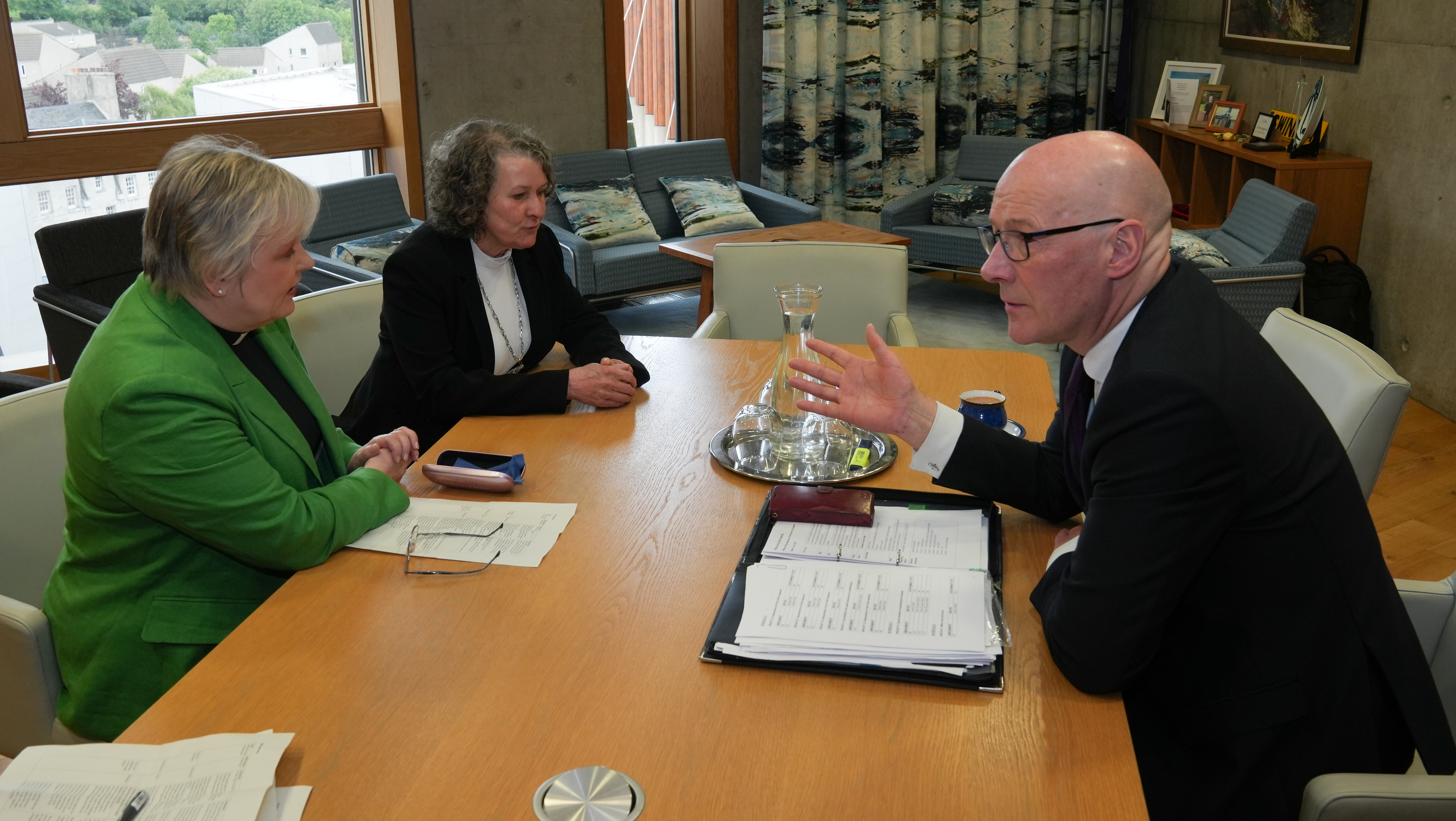
Fiona Smith and Rosemary Frew meeting first minister John Swinney in June 2025

On 31 December 2024, it was announced that Frew has been nominated to serve as the Moderator of the General Assembly of the Church of Scotland. She took her place on 17 May 2025 and she will serve until May 2026. Her Principal Clerk will be Fiona Smith who had welcomed the appointment of Lady Elish Angiolini as Lord High Commissioner to the 2025 General Assembly.

Frew described her appointment as Moderator of the General Assembly of the Church of Scotland as "incredibly humbling", saying she was humbled by the fact she has "the qualities needed for the role". She vowed to bring her "faith, hope, passions and enthusiasm to the position". She had previously been approached several times prior to her appointment to the position about the possibility to assuming the role in the place, but claimed it was "easy to say no" as she didn't feel the time was right prior to her eventual appointment in May 2025.

In October 2025 she accompanied King Charles III on a visit to Rome to meet the Pope. She was congratulated by the temporary Principal Clerk and in the Scottish Parliament.

She is due to be succeeded in the role in May 2026 by Rev. Gordon Kennedy of Craiglockhart Church.

== Personal life ==
She was raised in Clarkston, in East Renfrewshire, before moving to Linlithgow when she was 14. She was raised within the Church of Scotland, being part of Giffnock South Church, and then St Michael's Church in Linlithgow where she later became a Sunday School teacher and a member of the Youth Fellowship.

She has been married to Dave since 8 September 1984, and has two grown-up children, Peter and Rebecca (Bex).

== See also ==
- List of moderators of the General Assembly of the Church of Scotland

Religious titles
Preceded by Shaw Paterson	Moderator of the General Assembly of the Church of Scotland; 2025-2026	Succeeded by Gordon Kennedy
