= Sheilagh Kesting =

British minister

The Very Reverend Sheilagh Kesting
- Moderator of the General Assembly
- Church: Church of Scotland
- In office: May 2007 to May 2008

Orders
- Ordination: January 1980

Personal details
- Born: 10 June 1953 (age 72) Stornoway, Isle of Lewis, Scotland
- Education: Nicolson Institute
- Alma mater: University of Edinburgh

Sheilagh Kesting (born 10 June 1953) is a Scottish minister of the Church of Scotland. She served as Moderator of the General Assembly from May 2007 to May 2008. She was the first female minister to be elected Moderator; she was the second woman as a female elder, Alison Elliot, had been elected for the 2004/2005 session. Since 1993, she has been based at the Church of Scotland Offices in Edinburgh as the full-time Secretary of the Church of Scotland Committee on Ecumenical Relations. She retired in September 2016 and was created a Dame of the Order of St Gregory the Great by Pope Francis in November 2016 in recognition of her exceptional service to the Holy See, and as a result of her commitment to ecumenism in Scotland.

== Early life and education ==
Born in Stornoway, Isle of Lewis, Kesting was educated at the Nicolson Institute in Stornoway and at the University of Edinburgh, where she graduated with a BA and a BD.

== Ordained ministry ==
She was probationer for the ministry at St. John's Renfield Church, Glasgow. She then worked for a few months at the Tom Allan Centre, Glasgow, working mainly with homeless women. Her first charge as a Church of Scotland minister was Overtown Parish Church, near Motherwell, North Lanarkshire, from 1980 until 1986. She was then minister at St Andrew's High Church, Musselburgh, East Lothian until 1993.

She has long held a keen interest and concern for ecumenical relations, leading to her appointment as Secretary to the Committee on Ecumenical Relations in 1993. She was also Secretary to the ecumenical conversations, the Scottish Churches Initiative for Union, the talks with the United Free Church of Scotland which led to the recent signing of a Covenant, the continuing talks with the Free Church of Scotland She is the joint secretary of the Joint Commission on Doctrine (of the Church of Scotland and the Roman Catholic Church).

Her formal style (following the end of her year as Moderator) is the Very Reverend Dr Sheilagh Kesting. She was succeeded as Moderator in May 2008 by the Rev David Lunan.

== See also ==
- List of moderators of the General Assembly of the Church of Scotland

Religious titles
Preceded by Alan McDonald	Moderator of the General Assembly of the Church of Scotland; 2007–2008	Succeeded by David Lunan
