= Principal Clerk of the General Assembly of the Church of Scotland =

The Principal Clerk of the General Assembly of the Church of Scotland is responsible for minute-keeping, correspondence and other documentation with regards to the General Assembly of the Church of Scotland.

The Principal Clerk is an ordained minister within the Church of Scotland, who leaves parish ministry to take up the full time appointment of Principal Clerk.

Since the General Assembly is heavily dependent on them, Clerks can often carry some considerable influence beyond their strict remit. They are often found representing the Church of Scotland at events, or accompanying the Moderator of the General Assembly in their role to events and meetings.

The principal clerk to the General Assembly holds a full-time position. Until 2010 the position of deputy clerk was also a full-time post but it has now reverted to being a part-time appointment. The clerks work together with the Procurator and the Solicitor of the Church to ensure the legal correctness of the actions of the Assembly.

There have been around 40 clerks of the General Assembly since the role began in the 1570s.

The current Principal Clerk is Rev. Dr. Alistair May. He took up the post at the end of the 2026 General Assembly on 18 May 2026.

== List of Principal Clerks ==
Below is a list of Principal Clerks of the General Assembly of the Church of Scotland.

- Thomas Nicholson (1596–1600's)
- Andrew Ker (1600's)
- Sir Archibald Johnston (1638–?)
- John Park (1694)
- John Bannantyne (1695–1700)
- David Dundas (1701–1703)
- John Dundas (1703–1731)
- William Grant (1731–1745)
- Dr. George Wishart (1746–1785?)
- James Hogg (1762)
- John Drysdale (1778–1788)
- Prof. Andrew Dalzell (1789–1807) [the first layman to hold the role]
- Alexander Carlyle (1789)
- Andrew Duncan (1807–1827)
- Dr. John Lee (1827–1835)
- Alexander Lockhart Simpson (1859–1861)
- John Cook (1862–1874)
- Dr. John Tulloch (1875)
- William Milligan (1876–?)
- Robert Herbert Story (1895–1898)
- Norman Macleod (1907–1911)
- David Paul (1912–1926)
- James Taylor Cox (1929-1946)
- James Harvey (1929-1939) [Joint Clerk]
- Louis Carrick Philips (1946-1948)
- Thomas Caldwell (1949–1953)
- William McNicol (1953-1955)
- James Boyd Longmuir (1955–1972)
- Charles Adamson Smith (1967-1968) [Acting Principal Clerk]
- Donald Farquhar Macleod MacDonald (1972–1985)
- Alexander Gordon McGillivray (1993-1994)
- James Weatherhead (1985–1996)
- Finlay MacDonald (1996–2010)
- John Chalmers (2010–2017)
- George Whyte (2017–2022)
- Fiona Smith (2022–Oct 2025)
- John McPake (acting Clerk) (Oct 2025 - May 2026)
- Alistair May (May 2026–)
