= Gordon Kennedy (minister) =

Moderator of the General Assembly of the Church of Scotland

The Right Reverend Gordon Kennedy
- Moderator of the General Assembly
- Church: Church of Scotland
- In office: May 2026 – May 2027
- Predecessor: Rosemary Frew

Orders
- Ordination: 16 June 1993

Personal details
- Born: 15 September 1963 (age 62) England
- Denomination: Presbyterianism
- Residence: Edinburgh
- Spouse: Fiona Kennedy (nee. Marshalsay)
- Children: 2 Sons

Gordon Kennedy (b. 15 September 1963) is a minister of the Church of Scotland, who became Moderator of the General Assembly of the Church of Scotland from 15 May 2026.

== Early life and education ==
Kennedy was born in England on 15 September 1963 to David and Grace Kennedy (nee. Jewell). He was raised in Glasgow, where he attended Crookston Castle Secondary School from 1975-80. He holds a Bachelor of Science degree in Civil Engineering from the University of Strathclyde (1980-85). He studied at the University of Glasgow for a civil engineering degree, and then again for his BD.

His home church was Partick South Church of Scotland, where his sister remains an elder.

== Ordained ministry ==
He was licensed by the Presbytery of Glasgow on 26 June 1992, and was an assistance at Bearsden North from 1992-93. He was ordained and inducted to New Cumnock Church on 16 June 1993, where he served until 2000. This was followed by twelve years serving at Portpatrick Parish Church linked with St Ninian's Parish Church in Stranraer, Wigtownshire (from 2000 to 2012). His current ministry is at Craiglockhart Church in Edinburgh.

Throughout his 32 years of ministry, he has served in various capacities of leadership roles in three presbyteries, as well as within the wider denomination. He has served on the former Council of Assembly, the Theological Commission and the Church Without Walls Special Commission.

He serves an honorary chaplain at Napier University. He has been the chair of the Evangelical Alliance Scotland board. He has also served as the chairperson of Forward Together, an evangelical network within the Church of Scotland.

In October 2025 he was nominated to succeed Right Rev Rosemary Frew as Moderator of the General Assembly of the Church of Scotland in May 2026.

== Moderator of the General Assembly of the Church of Scotland ==
On 15 May 2026, at the beginning of the 2026 General Assembly, Gordon was elected as Moderator of the General Assembly. Rev Ian Cathcart and Rev Ramsay Shields were appointed as his chaplains for the year.

== Personal life ==
Since 14 March 1987, Kennedy has been married to Rev Fiona Kennedy, an OLM (Ordained Local Minister) who works with various churches in Edinburgh. Together, the couple have two adult sons, John and Andrew - the latter is married to Bonnie.

== See also ==
- List of moderators of the General Assembly of the Church of Scotland
