= Lucy Winkett =

British Anglican priest (born 1968)

The Reverend Lucy Winkett
- Rector of St James's Church, Piccadilly
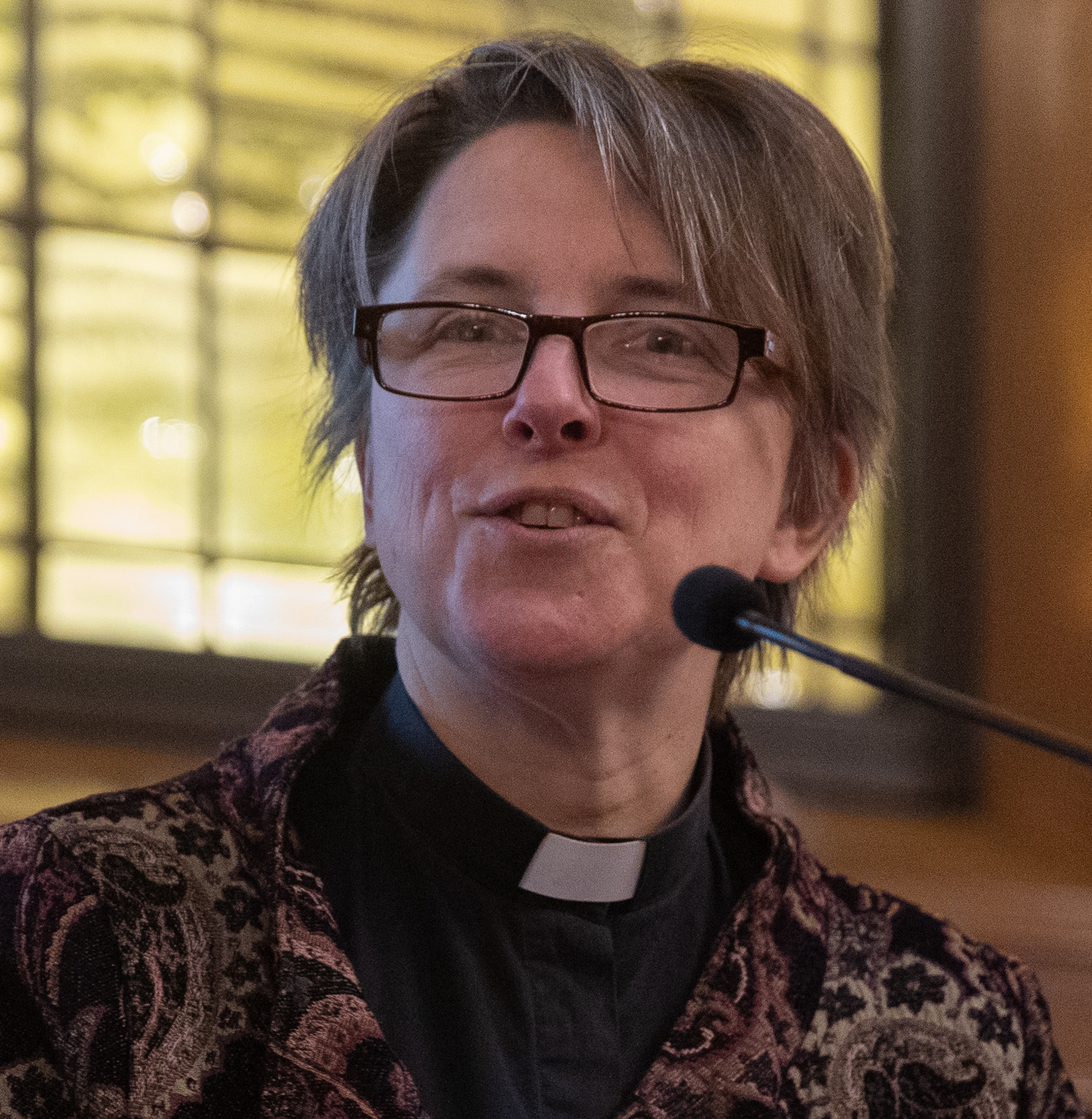
- Winkett in 2019
- Diocese: Diocese of London
- In office: 2010–present
- Other post: Priest in charge of St Pancras Church, Euston Road (2023–present)
- Previous post: Canon Precentor of St Paul's Cathedral (2003–2010)

Orders
- Ordination: 1995 (deacon); 1996 (priest)

Personal details
- Born: Lucy Clare Winkett; 8 January 1968 (age 58)
- Education: Selwyn College, Cambridge; Royal College of Music; Queen's College, Edgbaston; University of Birmingham

Lucy Clare Winkett (born 8 January 1968) is a British Anglican priest, who since 2010 has been the Rector of St James's Church, Piccadilly. Her early ordained ministry was spent at St Paul's Cathedral, London, where she was a minor canon and chaplain from 1997 to 2003, and the canon precentor from 2003 to 2010. She was the first female priest to join the clergy of St Paul's Cathedral.

She is a Vice President of the National Churches Trust.

== Early life and education ==
Winkett was born on 8 January 1968 in Portsmouth, Hampshire, England, to Bryan and Cecilia Winkett. She was educated at Dr Challoner's High School, an all-girls grammar school in Little Chalfont, Buckinghamshire. She won a choral scholarship to Selwyn College, Cambridge, where she studied modern history. Her contemporaries at Cambridge included the comedian Alexander Armstrong, with whom she starred in a production of Guys and Dolls. She graduated from the University of Cambridge with a Bachelor of Arts (BA) degree in 1990; as of tradition, this was promoted to a Master of Arts (MA (Cantab)) degree in 1994. She then entered the Royal College of Music to train as a singer and completed the ARCM qualification in 1992.

Having trained as a singer, she changed career path and began training for ordained ministry at Queen's College, Edgbaston. During her training, she also studied theology at the University of Birmingham and graduated with a Bachelor of Divinity (BD) degree in 1994. While she was an ordinand, she was part of the BBC documentary The Calling.

== Ordained ministry ==
Winkett was ordained in the Church of England as a deacon in 1995 and as a priest in 1996. She served her curacy at St Michael and All Angels, Little Ilford, London in the Diocese of Chelmsford. In 1997, she was appointed a minor canon and a chaplain of St Paul's Cathedral. When her appointment was announced in February 1997, it was criticised by the cathedral's chancellor, John Halliburton, who was against the ordination of women as priests. She was also reportedly spat at by members of the clergy at St Paul's. In 2003, she was appointed precentor and a canon residentiary of St Paul's. She returned to parish ministry when she was appointed Rector of St James's Church, Piccadilly in October 2010. In November 2023, she was additionally licensed as priest in charge of St Pancras Church, Euston Road, London.

Winkett writes, speaks and debates on a wide range of issues reflecting on culture, gender and religion. She was a contributor to the best-selling Why I Am Still an Anglican (Continuum 2006) and to Seven Words for Three Hours (DLT 2005). She is author of Our Sound Is Our Wound (Continuum 2010), which was the Archbishop of Canterbury's Lent Book, and a regular contributor to BBC Radio 4's Thought for the Day. She is a founding advisor to Theos, a think tank launched in 2006. She serves as Chair of Governors of St Mary Magdalene Academy, Islington, and of a non-governmental organisation, the Amos Trust.

In September 2025 she was one of the signatories of an open letter complaining about the misuse of the symbol of the cross. The letter cited its use in racist and anti-Muslim rallies. The letter was also signed by over thirty others including Rowan Williams and the Rev Fiona Smith of the Church of Scotland.

== Personal life ==
In her second year at university Winkett's boyfriend Andrew Stillwell had a climbing accident which left him in a coma. She flew to Switzerland and was with him when he died from the injuries. His death had a profound effect on Winkett and contributed to her vocation to pursue ordination as a priest.

== Styles ==
- Miss Lucy Winkett (1968–1995)
- The Revd Lucy Winkett (1995–2003)
- The Revd Canon Lucy Winkett (2003–2010)
- The Revd Lucy Winkett (2010–present)

== Selected works ==
- Winkett, Lucy (2005). Newell, Edmund (ed.). Seven words for three hours: a Good Friday meditation. London: Darton Longman & Todd. ISBN 978-0232526455.
- Winkett, Lucy (2006). "Signposts in society: cathedral ministry and being a woman priest in the Church of England". In Chartres, Caroline (ed.). Why I am still an Anglican: essays and conversations. London: Continuum. pp. 145–156. ISBN 978-0826483126.
- Winkett, Lucy (2010). Our sound is our wound: contemplative listening to a noisy world. London: Continuum. ISBN 978-0826439215.
- Guite, Malcolm; Quash, Ben; Ward, Frances; Winkett, Lucy; Wells, Samuel (2014). Reflections for Lent 2015. Church House Publishing. ISBN 978-0715144602.
