= David Lacy =

David William Lacy DL (born 26 April 1952) is a minister of the Church of Scotland. He was the moderator of the General Assembly of the Church of Scotland in 2005-6.

== Background and career ==
Lacy was born in Inverness on 26 April 1952, attended Aberdeen Grammar School from 1963 to 1965 and completed his schooling at the Glasgow High School.

Lacy was ordained in 1976 whilst serving as Probationer at St George's West Church in Edinburgh. In 1977, he was inducted to Knightswood St. Margaret's Parish Church, Glasgow, his first charge. In 1989, he moved to become minister of Henderson Church, Kilmarnock. He is a former convener of the Assembly Board of Practice and Procedure, was Business Convener from 2001 to 2004, and served on the new Council of Assembly. His formal title (following the end of his Moderatorial year) is the Very Reverend Dr David Lacy.

== Other candidates ==
Lacy was one of five candidates considered by the Committee to Nominate the Moderator. The others were:

- James Gibson, Minister at Bothwell Parish Church and a Chaplain to the Queen
- Peter Neilson, Mission Developments Facilitator at the Church of Scotland Offices in Edinburgh
- Loudon Blair, Minister at Galston Parish Church, Ayrshire
- Erik Cramb, National Industrial Mission Organiser with the Church of Scotland

== See also ==
- List of moderators of the General Assembly of the Church of Scotland

Religious titles
Preceded by Alison Elliot	Moderator of the General Assembly of the Church of Scotland; 2005–2006	Succeeded by Alan McDonald
