= Dr Challoner's High School =

Location
- Cokes Lane; Little Chalfont, Buckinghamshire, HP7 9QB; England; 51°40′02″N 0°34′11″W

Information
- Type: Academy Grammar School
- Motto: Latin: Pro Maleficiis Beneficia
- Established: 1962
- Specialist: Sports; Language
- Department for Education URN: 137219 Tables
- Headteacher: Alan Roe
- Gender: Girls
- Age: 11 to 18
- Enrolment: 1110
- Houses: Bronte; Curie; Nightingale; Pankhurst; Teresa; Rosa
- Colour: Navy blue
- Website: http://www.challonershigh.com/

Dr Challoner's High School, abbreviated to DCHS, is a selective secondary grammar school for girls between the ages of 11 and 18, located in Buckinghamshire, England. In August 2011 the school became an Academy.

In September 2001, the school was awarded specialist school status as a Sports College, by the Department for Education and Skills (DfES). It was also awarded a second specialism as a Language College. It is an affiliate member of the Girls' Schools Association. In 2011, Ofsted judged the school to be Outstanding and in 2014 DCHS achieved the Exceptional Schools Award.

== History ==
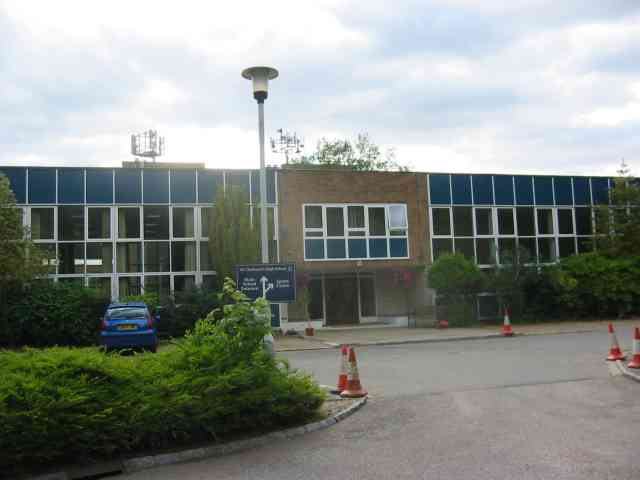
The fascia of Dr Challoner's High School in Little Chalfont.

The school was established in 1962 as an all-girls' school, when the previously mixed Dr Challoner's Grammar School became an all-boys' school, due to increasing roll numbers.

It was given the name in mid-April 1962 by the Chesham Divisional Executive of the Buckinghamshire Education Committee. It had a boarding house.

There were 350 girls when it opened in September 1963, to house 540. Princess Marina of Greece and Denmark, wife of Prince George, Duke of Kent, attended the official opening of the school at 3pm on May 7 1964, where she was greeted by head girl Clare Rowson, and the Lord Lieutenant of Buckinghamshire Brigadier Sir Henry Floyd, 5th Baronet. It was built by E S Gates Ltd, of Little Chalfont, costing £200,000.

There were 615 girls by September 1965. By 1967 the school was running out of room for laboratories and for the sixth form. The lack of accommodation was last until the late 1970s.

The Minister of State of Education, Shirley Williams, visited the school speech day, on Tuesday 5 March 1968, and gave a talk, where she warned the girls about 'the dangers of leaving school with the object of eventually getting married'.

It had joint drama productions with the male grammar school in the late 1960s. In 1973 the county council proposed to enlarge the school, and by 1976 £278,000 was given by the council for a 140-place extension. From 1974 to 1979, comprehensive education was frequently discussed.

The Top of the Form radio series was terminated at the end of September 1986, with the last final broadcast on December 1 1986. But before that last series had finished, the first edition of a replacement series 'Pop of the Form' was recorded in Aylesbury in late November 1986. Three girls were interviewed by Nick Barraclough, all were aged 17. The team won against a team from Aylesbury 54-37, but later lost 77-83, to a team from Devon.

In late July 1992 work began on a new £750,000 technology block, built by Wiltshier Construction, to be finished by the summer of 1993. The county council had refused to pay for this previously. The new technology block was opened on Friday 6 May 1994 by local Conservative MP Cheryl Gillan.

On Friday December 20 1996 Any Questions? was broadcast from the school, with Tony Banks, Sir Nicholas Lyell, and David Hart, the General Secretary of the National Association of Head Teachers.

== Entry ==
To gain entry to the school, pupils from primary schools in the local area are invited to do the 11-plus exam. Entry to a grammar school usually requires a score of 121/141, though pupils who gain scores of below 121 are invited to appeal their case. Prospective pupils who did not take the 11+ (e.g. those who join in later years) also take the school's own entry test.

== House system ==
The school operates a house system, with girls being placed in one of the six houses at the start of their time at the school along with the rest of their forms. The six houses are named after notable women in history and each have a corresponding colour: Bronte is blue, Curie is green, Nightingale is purple, Pankhurst is yellow, Teresa is red and Rosa is orange. Six girls in the upper sixth are appointed the head of houses each year. The houses play a part in music and sports in the school, with girls earning points for winning competitions and events, in particular interhouse, a sports half-day competition occurring once a term for years 7–11. At the end of each academic year one house will win the house cup for having the most points.

House	Colour	Significance
Bronte	Blue	Named after the three authors, the Brontë sisters, Charlotte, Anne and Emily
Curie	Green	Named after Marie Curie, the physicist and chemist who won two Nobel Prizes
Nightingale	Purple	Named after the nurse, Florence Nightingale, who nursed during the Crimean War and left a great legacy to nursing
Pankhurst	Yellow	Named after Emmeline Pankhurst and her daughters, Sylvia Pankhurst and Christabel Pankhurst, who were great figures in the British suffragette movement and the campaign to give women the vote
Teresa	Red	Named after Mother Teresa, the Catholic nun and humanitarian who won the Nobel Peace Prize
Rosa	Orange	Named after Rosa Parks, the American activist, a known pivotal person in the Montgomery bus boycott.

== Facilities and classes ==
=== Initial subjects ===
Pupils are introduced to a wide range of subjects from Year 7, including Computer Science, Art, Music and Drama. Pupils study French, German and Spanish for the first year. In years 8 and 9 the students study Latin, in turn dropping one of their other two languages, before continuing on with at least one language at GCSE level.

All pupils take at least eight subjects for GCSE, although most take 9 or 10 subjects. Three A levels are taken by most students but in the case of certain subjects (further maths, music etc.), or outstanding achievement at GCSE, students may take four. The vast majority of pupils go on to university or some form of higher education.

=== School buildings ===
The Tower Block: Humanity subjects, Religious Studies, History and Geography are taught here, as well as Classics and Latin. This building was part of the school when it first opened in 1962.
The Science Block: Also part of the school when it first opened, the three sciences are taught here. The art rooms were previously situated upstairs but have been renovated to become new science rooms.
The Curve Building: Added in the early 1980s, extended in 1992 and again in 1998, English, Maths and Art are taught here. The library is also situated in this building, as is the Sixth Form Common Room and the Careers Room. The curved space between the Curved Building and the Tower Block creates a naturally sloped outdoor theatre area.
The Modern Foreign Languages Building: Known as the MFL Block, French, Spanish and German are taught here, although the Music teaching and practice rooms and also one physics laboratory are attached to it.
The Sports Hall: Completed in 2002, most indoor sports lessons are held here. There are changing rooms with showers available. The school fields and Tennis, Netball and astro-turf courts are situated by this building. The Bedrose Building: Known as the sixth form centre where students use the space for working between frees and spending time with friends.

The school's original gym and a dance and drama studio, built more recently, were knocked down to make way for a new drama complex, completed around 2009 with the help of fundraising and donations from parents. There is also a canteen and Main Hall at the front of the school, attached to the Tower Block and part of the original school of 1962.

== Sport ==
County tennis training took place from 1964.

Alyson Thomson (born October 1 1958) won the high jump for intermediate girls in the British Schools International in north Wales in 1975, and came third in the high jump in the national 1978 WAAA Championships. In May 1980 in Wales, she jumped 1.78 metres.

Helen Woodley, a medicine student at Gonville and Caius College, Cambridge, took part in the Women's Boat Race on March 22 1987. Liz Howell, of Gerrards Cross, later took part in the Women's Boat Race in March 1990, won, March 1991 and March 1992, when part of Jesus College, Cambridge, where she studied Modern Languages. Liz had competed in the 400 metres hurdles when at school. Sue Appleboom won the individual 1991 British Rowing Championships and 1994 British Rowing Championships.

Clare Cunningham (athlete) took part in the 1992 Paralympics, at age 15.

== Headteachers ==
- 1962–1974: Agnes McMaster, she left in December 1974; she had attended Whalley Range High School in Manchester and studied Geography at the University of Manchester, being the former headmistress of Chatham Grammar School for Girls from 1955 to December 1961, and was the deputy head of Kidbrooke Comprehensive School for Girls from 1954, and previously headmistress of Bredbury Secondary Girls' School
- 1974–1986: Jean Williams
- 1986–1993: Sheila Cousens, she left in July 1993, aged 63, a Chemistry teacher, with a PhD, who had taught at Wycombe Abbey School, before joining the school in 1965, being deputy head from 1976
- 1993–2003: Sue Lawson, aged 47, former deputy head of the George Abbot School in Surrey
- 2003–2006: Hilary Winter
- 2006 (Summer term): Andrew MacTavish, acting headmaster
- 2006–2011: Peg Hulse
- 2011–2015: Ian Cooksey
- 2015–present: Alan Roe

== Notable former pupils ==
- Fern Britton, television presenter
- Amal Clooney, lawyer, activist and author
- Magenta Devine, broadcaster, journalist
- Anna Gilford (performs under the name Honey G), The X Factor contestant
- Holly Jackson, author
- Anna Valentine, fashion designer
- Lucy Winkett, first female Canon of St Paul's Cathedral

== Notable achievements ==
In 2014 the school was awarded Exceptional Schools Award by the Best Practice Network, only the ninth school in the whole country to receive the award after an extensive inspection. In 2011 DCHS was judged to be an Outstanding school by OFSTED.

In 2008, Dr Challoner's High achieved the best A Level results of any Buckinghamshire state school with an A/B pass rate of 84%. At GCSE the A*/A grade pass rate was 81% and over a third of girls achieved all A*/As. The school has appeared in the Times Parent Power school league tables; 31st best state school in 2007, 16th in 2008 and 23rd in 2009, each time being the top state school in Buckinghamshire. Ofsted rated 'Grade 1 – Outstanding' in its last inspection of the school in 2011.

In 2010 the school achieved another set of outstanding A Level results. 22.3% of entries were graded A*, a higher figure than any other Buckinghamshire school. Over 88% of entries were graded A*-B.

In recent years the school has also won Good Schools' Guide awards in History, Politics and Spanish. The Politics department won the top prize, achieving the best A Level results of any school in England for the period 2004–06. In addition to its academic success, the school has a proud reputation for sporting success, recently winning the national U16 basketball title and the tennis team were national runners-up in the year 8 and under Nestle School Teams Tennis competition. In December 2008 the school won the national junior cross-country championships held in Leicestershire.

== See also ==
- Grammar schools in the United Kingdom
