= Alison Elliot =

Moderator of the General Assembly of the Church of Scotland

Alison Elliot CBE FRSE
- Born: 27 November 1948 (age 77); Edinburgh, Scotland
- Occupation: academic session clerk
- Known for: first woman elected as Moderator of the General Assembly of the Church of Scotland

Academic background
- Education: Bathgate Academy
- Alma mater: University of Edinburgh; University of Sussex

Alison Janet Elliot (born 27 November 1948) is a Scottish psychologist, and an elder and session clerk at Greyfriars Kirk in Edinburgh. She is an honorary fellow at New College, Edinburgh.

Elliot was formerly Associate Director of the Centre for Theology and Public Issues at the University of Edinburgh, Scotland. In 2004 she became the first woman ever to be elected Moderator of the General Assembly of the Church of Scotland.

== Background and education ==
Alison Elliot was born in Edinburgh in 1948. She was educated at Bathgate Academy, the University of Edinburgh and the University of Sussex.

== Career ==
Her professional career is in psychology, but her public profile has been chiefly through her church work. She was Research Associate in the Department of Linguistics at the University of Edinburgh 1973–1974, then lecturer in psychology at the University of Lancaster 1974–1976 and at the University of Edinburgh 1977–1985. She is the author of two publications: Child Language (1981) and The Miraculous Everyday (2005).

She served as Convener of the Committee on Church and Nation of the General Assembly of the Church of Scotland 1996–2000, as well as Session Clerk at Greyfriars Kirk in Edinburgh. She was involved in building ecumenical relations, and was a member of the Central Committee of the Conference of European Churches (CEC) 2003-2009 (and also moderated CEC's Assembly held in Lyon, France, in July 2009). She played a key role in Action of Churches Together in Scotland. In 2004 she was elected Moderator of the General Assembly of the Church of Scotland and was the first woman to be elected to that post.

In 2016, she became only the third person to receive the Scottish Public Service Awards' Lifetime Achievement Award.

She is a founding board member of the Palestine Festival of Literature. Since 2007 she has been Convener of the Scottish Council for Voluntary Organisations.

In 2018 she became General Secretary of The Royal Society of Edinburgh, of which she has been a Fellow (FRSE) since 2008.

== Artistic recognition ==
In 2004 the Scottish National Portrait Gallery commissioned a portrait of Elliot by Jennifer McRae.

== Honours ==
Elliot was appointed an Officer of the Order of the British Empire (OBE) in the 2003 New Year Honours for services to the Church of Scotland and Ecumenical Relationships, and promoted to Commander of the same order (CBE) in the 2018 Birthday Honours for public service.

== See also ==
- General Assembly of the Church of Scotland
- List of moderators of the General Assembly of the Church of Scotland

Religious titles
Preceded by Iain Torrance	Moderator of the General Assembly of the Church of Scotland; 2004–2005	Succeeded by David Lacy
