= Ministers and elders of the Church of Scotland =

Leaders of Church of Scotland congregations

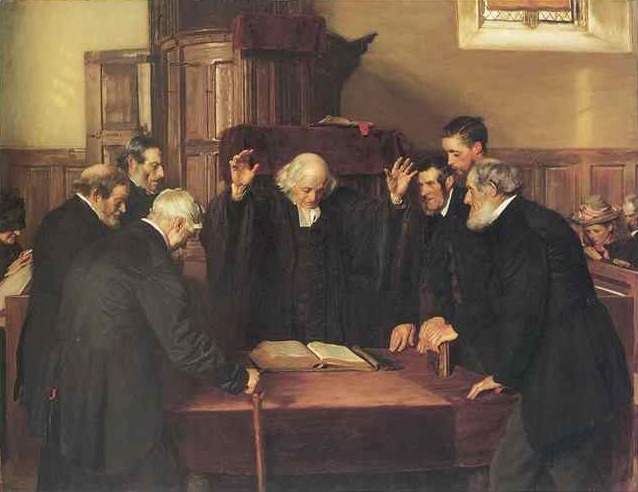
The Ordination of Elders in a Scottish Kirk, painting by John Henry Lorimer, 1891

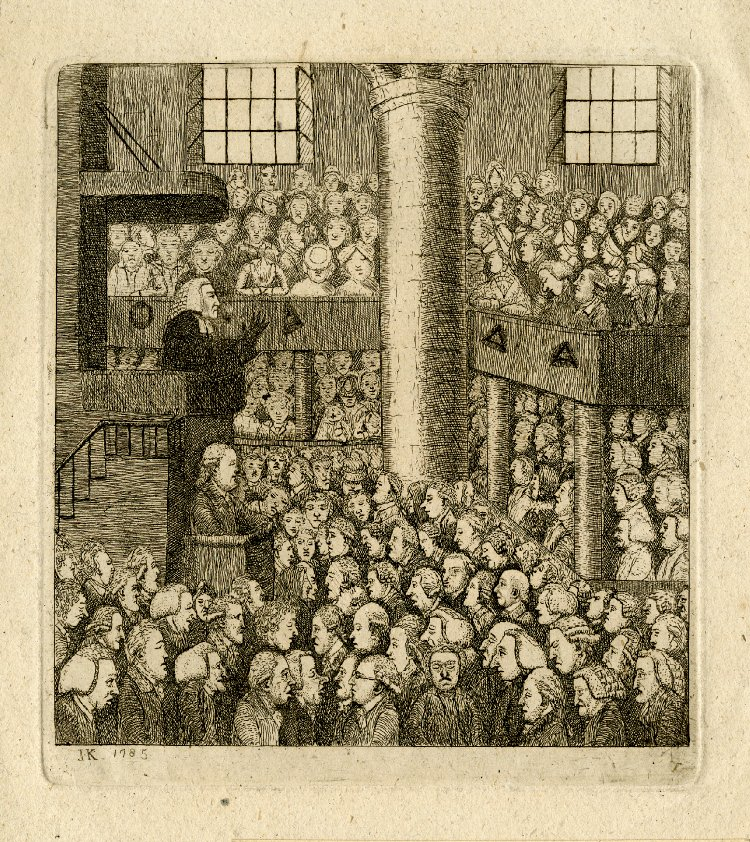
Alexander Webster, minister of the Tolbooth Kirk in St. Giles, Edinburgh and moderator of the Church of Scotland in 1753, was responsible for providing the first reliable estimate of Scotland's population in modern times. Based on returns from parish ministers, mostly for the year 1755, he calculated Scotland's population at 1,265,380. His census did not, however, include most of the country's small Roman Catholic minority, figures for which relied on ministers reporting the number of "papists" in their parishes. Internal evidence suggests that this was done inconsistently.

A Church of Scotland congregation is led by its minister and elders. Both of these terms are also used in other Christian denominations: see Minister (Christianity) and Elder (Christianity). This article discusses the specific understanding of their roles and functions in the Scottish Church.

== Terminology ==
The Greek term πρεσβύτερος presbýteros, used in the New Testament as a designation for the leaders of the Early Church (e.g. Acts 11.30), has three different equivalents in English: elder, presbyter and priest. Priest is the oldest, a borrowing into Old English via Latin, elder (first attested 1526) is a translation of the underlying meaning of the Greek word, and presbyter (1597) is a learned correction of the loan-word. However, the semantics of priest are complicated by the fact that it is traditionally used also as the translation of a different New Testament Greek word, ἱερεύς hiereús, which refers to those who perform sacrificial rites in the Jerusalem temple and in pagan temples, but also appears as a title for Jesus (Heb 7.26). Consequently, the word priest was rejected by the Reformed and Puritan traditions as a term for Christian leadership, as part of the more general rejection of sacrificial elements in the Catholic understanding of the mass. Elder and presbyter remain theoretically as synonyms in Church of Scotland usage, but in practice presbyter is often reserved for those elders who are members of presbytery, one of the higher courts of the Church.

Minister comes from a Latin word meaning servant, and is also used in the Church as a verb: to minister to the needs of God's people.

In Scottish Gaelic, a minister is called ministear, while an elder is referred to as èildear.

== Concepts ==
In calling itself a Presbyterian Church, the Church of Scotland declares itself to be a Church governed by elders. Although colloquial usage in the Church distinguishes between ministers and elders, the minister is understood theologically to be an elder with a special task. The minister is styled as a "teaching elder", the other members of Kirk Session are known as "ruling elders". All elders are ordained, and the ordination of ministers is understood to be an ordinance of a similar nature to that of elders, but with a different charge.

== Role of the minister ==
A minister is ordained by the Presbytery to the "ministry of word and sacrament", and is regarded as being the teaching elder.

A minister has the pastoral responsibility for a congregation, which they exercise under the supervision of the Presbytery. The minister is responsible for the conduct of public worship, and is alone authorised to administer the sacraments of baptism and communion.

The minister is moderator of the Kirk Session, is a member of the Presbytery, and on average is a member of the General Assembly once every four years.

== Selection and training of ministers ==
The longstanding system of ministry training has recently changed.

=== Selection ===
People who express interest in entering the ministry must first attend a one-day conference, at which various options (including the ministry of Word and Sacrament, the auxiliary ministry, the diaconate and other forms of church work) are outlined. Thereafter, applicants for the full-time ministry must undertake a variety of assessments, leading up to a residential two-day procedure known as an "Assessment Conference" (previously "Selection School") held at various locations around Scotland. Those who are accepted at the end of this selection procedure are recognised as candidates for the ministry. From this point on, they are under the supervision of their home presbytery, but also of the Ministries Council in the Church's offices in Edinburgh.

=== Initial training ===
All ministers of the Church of Scotland must have a university qualification in theology or divinity. While foreign qualifications are accepted, most candidates study for a Bachelor of Divinity (B.D.) degree at the theological colleges of the ancient universities of Scotland (St Mary's College, St Andrews; Trinity College, Glasgow; Christ's College, Aberdeen and New College, Edinburgh). In 2006 the Highland Theological College, Dingwall, was also approved as a centre for training.

An increasing number of ministers are opting to take a further qualification, such as the Diploma in Pastoral Theology (Dip.P.Th.), Master of Theology (M.Th.) or Doctor of Ministry (D.Min.) degree courses.

The B.D. course was traditionally a three-year post-graduate degree, though mature students may be permitted to take a shorter course of studies. Since the 1980s it has also been permissible for school-leavers to go straight to theological college to do a B.D. as a first degree; in this case the course of study is longer, at least five years. The recently revised system has introduced a course with a system of four placements in congregations, replacing the former student attachments, 12 or 18 month probationary period and "trials for licence".

In addition to their academic studies, they are also trained through a conference programme and through the "Ministries Trainling Network" in church law exams, public speaking, safeguarding and pastoral care.

On completing their studies, candidates were formerly "licensed to preach" by their home presbytery and became a probationer, serving a 12 or 18 month full-time probationary period in a parish. This probationary year has now been replaced by a final 15 month placement, although the objective remains very similar (albeit with more short residential training courses.)

When the training has been sustained, the candidate is free to seek a charge. The Church of Scotland does not ordain ministers without simultaneously inducting them into their first charge. This is because, theologically, ministers are ordained "to do" a task rather than "to be" a minister. This stands in contrast to some other denominations which ordain their clergy on completion of training.

=== Theological colleges ===
Before Church reunion in 1929, the United Free Church of Scotland maintained its own colleges in Edinburgh, Aberdeen and Glasgow, whilst candidates for the ministry in the Church of Scotland studied in the University Faculties of Divinity. The union of 1929 necessitated the integration of the two systems. The theological colleges now form integral academic schools at the universities of St Andrews, Glasgow, Aberdeen and Edinburgh. The Church used to appoint the Professors of Divinity along with certain other chairs but the cost of maintaining these chairs necessitated transferring patronage to the academic senate or university court of each university.

Though technically still Church colleges, these are almost indistinguishable from the university schools. The Church still advises on the appointment of professors and advises on the appointment of the principal of the college. The head of the School of Divinity at St Andrews is currently (2015) Mark Elliot. The principal of St Mary's College is Ian Bradley and as he is an ordained Church of Scotland minister, he is entitled to use the prenominal Very Reverend whilst in office.

== Role of the elder ==
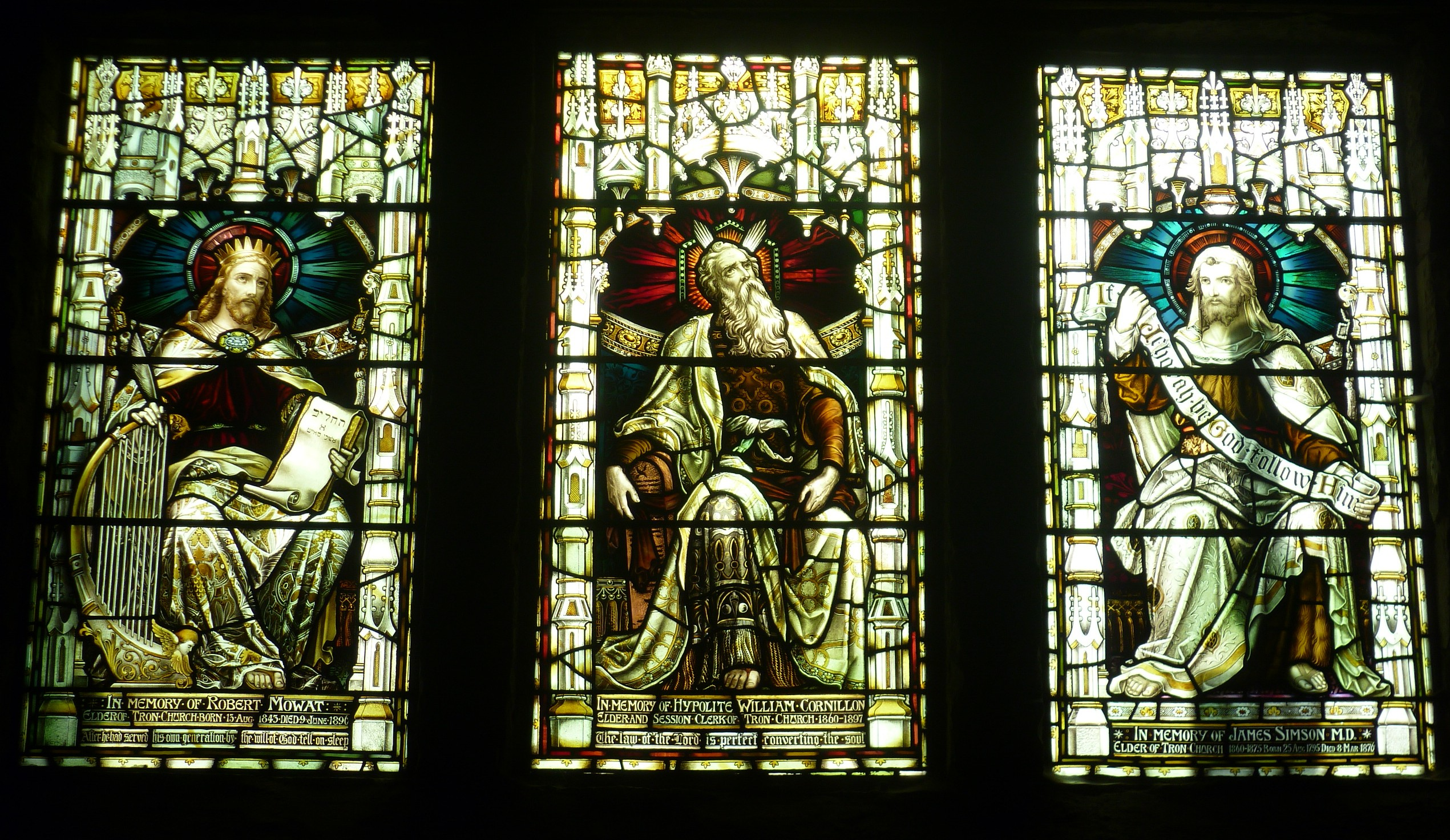
Memorial windows commemorating past elders of the Tron Kirk in Edinburgh

A ruling elder is ordained by the minister and Kirk Session of the parish, and is answerable to the Kirk Session. Like a minister, an elder is ordained for life.

Unlike members of parish councils in other denominations, elders are understood to have pastoral responsibilities, which they carry out under the guidance of the minister. Usually a parish will be divided into elders' districts, and the elders are expected to visit the church members resident in their district on a regular basis. Elders also often assist the minister in the distribution of the elements at a formal Communion Service.

All elders are members of the Kirk Session. They may also be members of the higher courts of the church. Each Kirk Session appoints one of its members to attend Presbytery, and on average once every four years, one of its members might be commissioned by Presbytery to the General Assembly. Since retired ministers, theology professors and ministers with non-parochial charges are members of Presbytery and sometimes of the Assembly, "equalising elders" are required in the higher courts of the Church to maintain the principle that ministers and elders are represented in equal numbers. Elders are eligible for appointment to any function in the higher courts, including Moderator of the Assembly.

When a congregation is unable to form a Kirk Session, for example when a new congregation is first founded, so-called "assessor elders", from neighbouring Kirk Sessions, may be appointed by the Presbytery.

== See also ==
- The Form of Presbyterial Church Government
- Ordination of women in the Church of Scotland
- Statistical Accounts of Scotland
