= General Assembly of the Church of Scotland =

Sovereign and highest court of the Church of Scotland

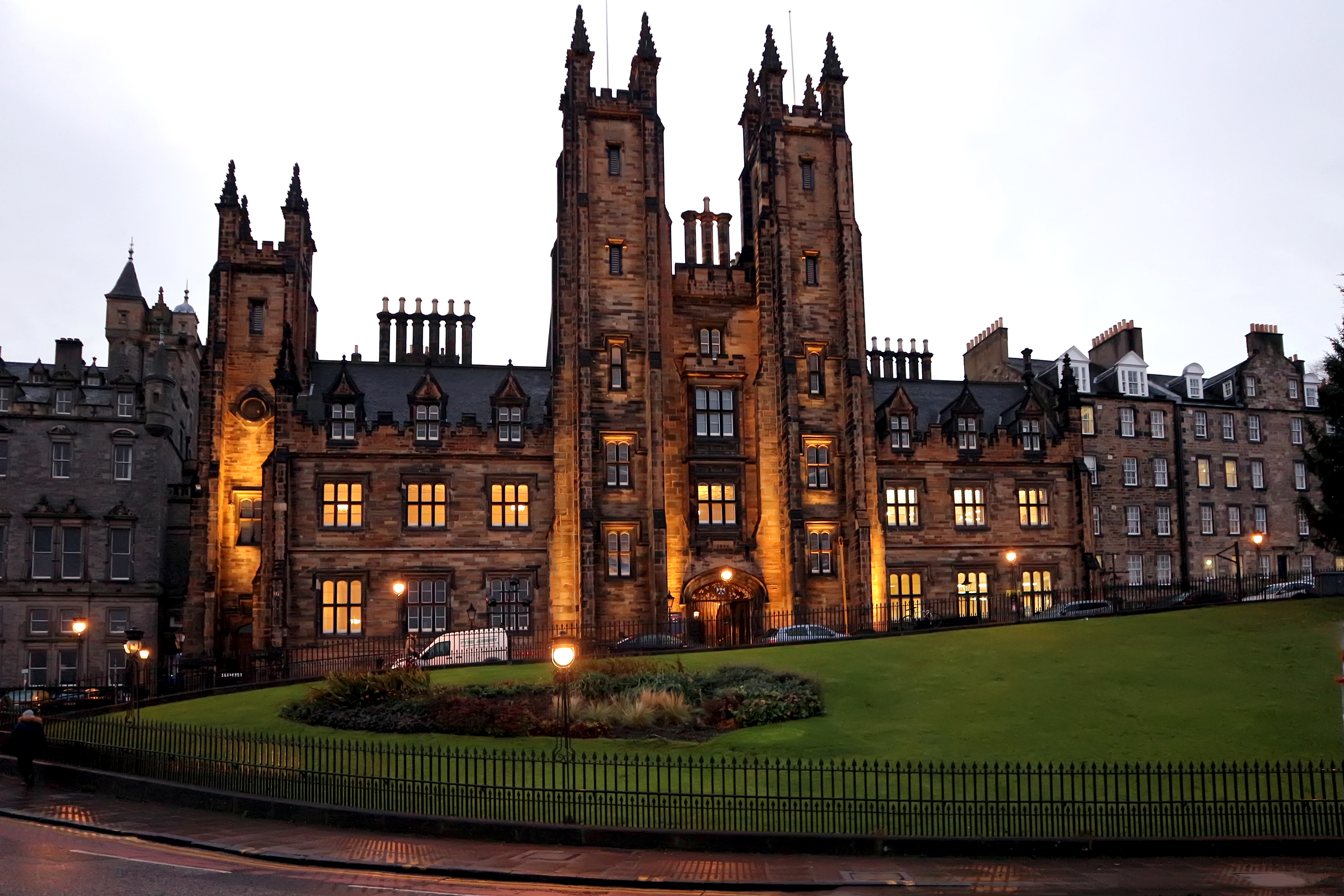
Entrance to the Assembly Hall from New College.

The General Assembly of the Church of Scotland is the sovereign and highest court of the Church of Scotland, and is thus the Church's governing body. It generally meets each year and is chaired by a Moderator elected at the start of the Assembly.

== Church courts ==
As a Presbyterian church, the Church of Scotland is governed by courts of elders rather than by bishops. At the bottom of the hierarchy of courts is the Kirk Session, the court of the parish; representatives of Kirk Sessions form the Presbytery, the local area court. Formerly there were also Synods at regional level, with authority over a group of presbyteries, but these have been abolished. At national level, the General Assembly stands at the top of this structure.

== Meetings ==
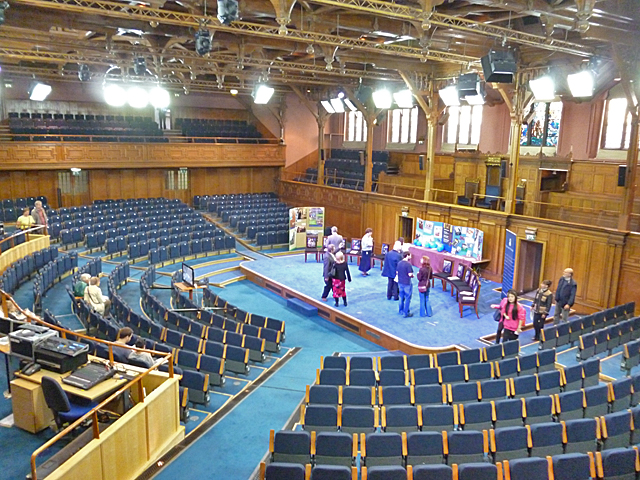
The General Assembly Hall (pictured in 2013)

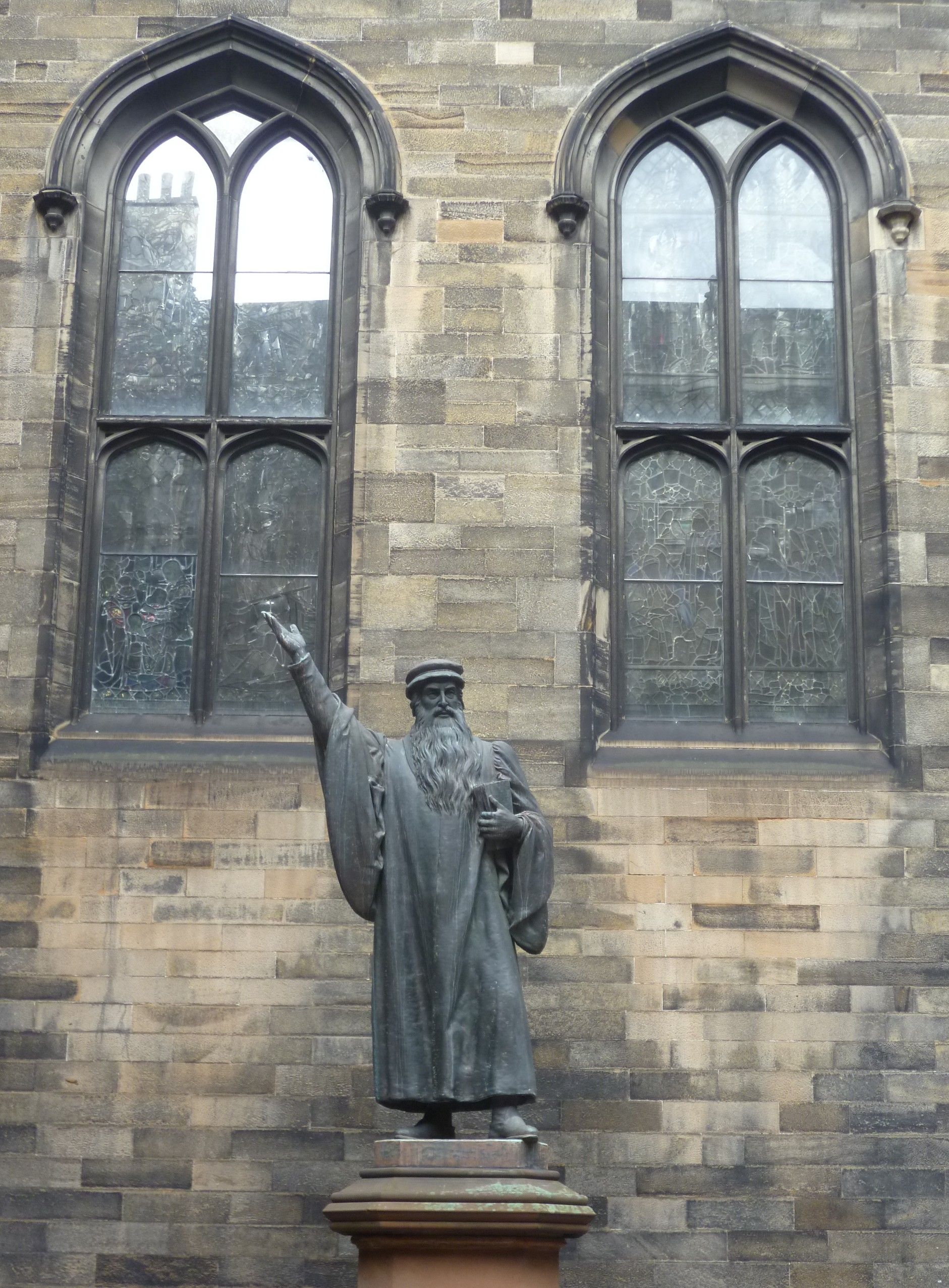
Statue of John Knox outside the Assembly Hall

General Assembly meetings are usually held in the Assembly Hall on the Mound, Edinburgh. This was originally built for the Free Church in the 19th century. Before this, from 1845 to 1929, the General Assembly had met in the Victoria Hall (the Highland Tolbooth Kirk) at the top of the Royal Mile, a purpose-built meeting hall and church whose 72-metre (236 ft) spire towers above the present Assembly Hall. When the Church of Scotland merged with the United Free Church of Scotland in 1929, the Mound premises were chosen as the Assembly Hall for the reunited Church of Scotland. Today the former Victoria Hall building is in secular use as the Hub. Earlier General Assemblies had taken place in different churches in Scotland's major burghs.

The Church of Scotland General Assembly usually meets for a week of intensive deliberation once a year in May. Ministers, elders and deacons are eligible to be "Commissioners" to the General Assembly. Typically a parish minister would attend the Assembly once every four years, accompanied by an elder from that congregation. The Assembly also has youth representatives and a few officials. Prior to each Assembly, a minister or elder is nominated to serve as Moderator for that year. At the start of the Assembly the Moderator is duly elected, although the election is considered a formality.

The Moderator presides from the Moderator's chair. Alongside them, the clerks to the Assembly and other officials are seated. Behind the Moderator is the throne gallery (used by the Monarch or the Lord High Commissioner), which can only be reached through a separate stairway not directly from the Assembly Hall; this symbolises the independence of the church from the Crown in matters spiritual, whilst recognising the status of the Monarch (both constitutionally and theologically).

The General Assembly can also meet elsewhere. A meeting of the Assembly was held in Glasgow to mark the city's status as European City of Culture. When the Scottish Parliament was instituted in 1999, the Assembly Hall was used by the Parliament until the new building at Holyrood was completed in 2004. During these years, the Assembly met in the Edinburgh International Conference Centre (1999) and the Usher Hall (2001); in the other years the Parliament temporarily moved out to allow the Assembly to use its own "home".

The General Assembly has its own Standing Orders. One particular example is Standing Order 54, which requires any proposal requiring additional expenditure to have been first considered by the Assembly's Stewardship and Finance Committee.

== Functions ==
The General Assembly has three basis functions: legislative, deliberative and judicial. The ongoing administration is delegated to councils and committees, which have to report annually to the Assembly.

The Assembly decides the Law of the Church. Thus each Assembly may amend the Law of previous Assemblies. This is moderated and controlled by means of the "Barrier Act" which forces the General Assembly to take account of the views of all Presbyteries if the proposal is one which is far reaching, and thus referred to Presbyteries and subsequently the next General Assembly.

== Membership ==
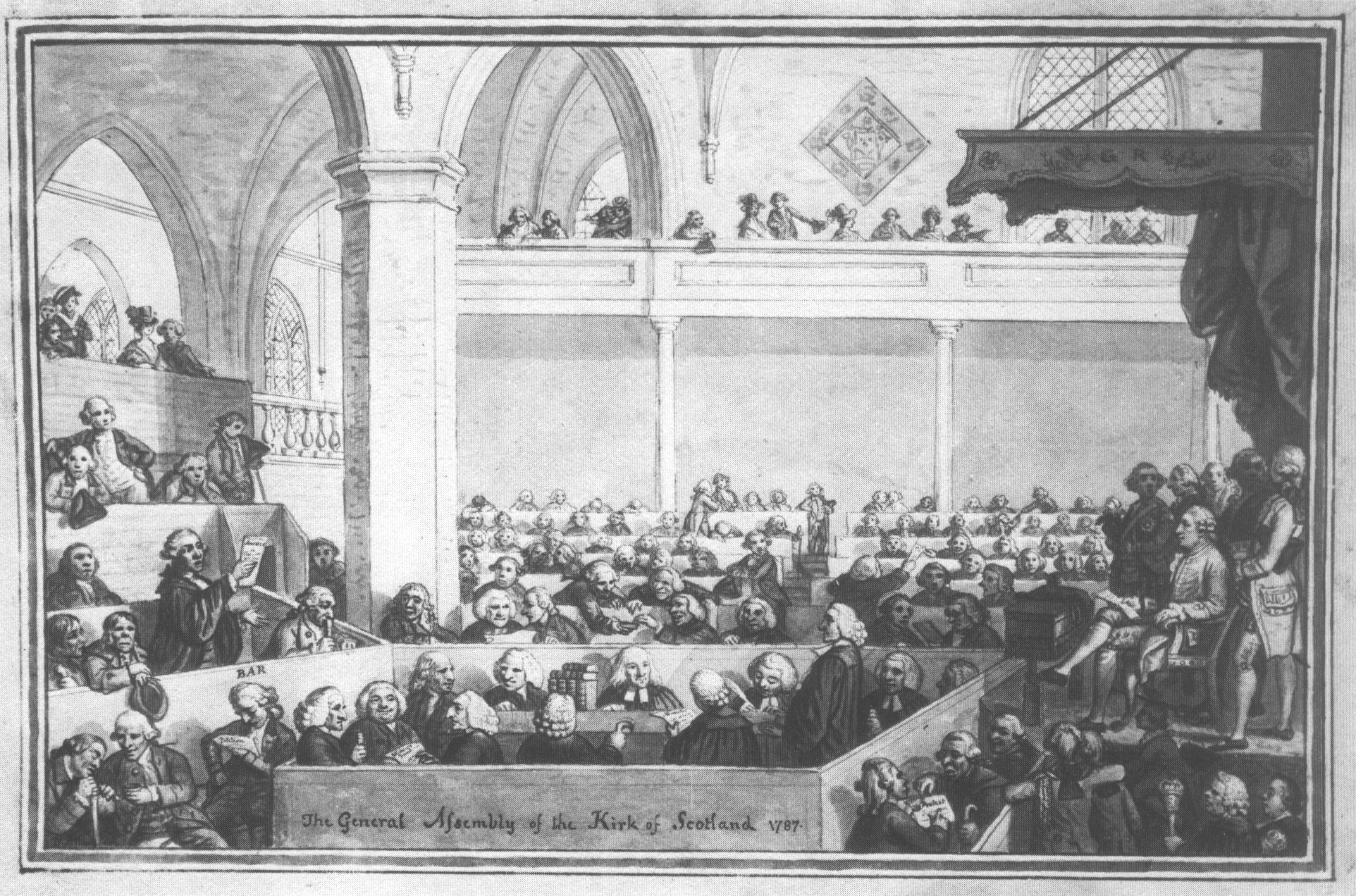
The General Assembly meeting in Edinburgh in 1787

Each Presbytery has to nominate Commissioners annually and these are chosen in rotation from the ministers and elders in the Presbytery's bounds (area). Elders who are commissioned need not be members of the Presbytery. In addition each Presbytery may appoint 'youth representatives' who are young people in the congregations of the presbytery. Youth representatives are also appointed by the 'Youth Assembly'. Youth representatives have the status of corresponding members of the Assembly.

Those elders who have, in the past, served as Moderators of the General Assembly are generally commissioned by their presbyteries in addition to the normal number of commissioners. They have, due to their experience in the Church, a heavy influence on the deliberations of the Assembly, which some commissioners and a range of Kirk members, find to be controversial.

The General assembly appoints 'corresponding members' who may speak and propose motions but may not vote. Apart from youth representatives these are guest commissioners from a wide range of partner churches around the world, and any of the Church of Scotland's Mission Partners (overseas workers) who may be resident in Scotland during the Assembly.

=== Legislation ===
The General Assembly can and does pass legislation governing the affairs of the Church. The Assembly discusses issues affecting church and society; the General Assembly is invited to "receive" reports from its committees and councils. Attached to each report are proposed "deliverances", which the Assembly is invited to approve, reject or modify. Presbyteries may put business before the General Assembly in the form of "overtures" which are debated and may be made into the Law of the Church.

=== Judicial functions ===
As a judicial body, the Assembly usually delegates most of its powers to the "Commission of Assembly" or to special tribunals. The General Assembly acts as a Court, and in matters spiritual cannot be appealed to any higher court. This is set out in the Acts Declaratory and the Church of Scotland Act 1921.

== Officials ==
The Assembly elects a Moderator to preside (see also the list of previous Moderators). The King is personally represented by a Lord High Commissioner, when the monarch is not personally in attendance, who has no vote. In 2025, Lady Elish Angiolini became the first practising Roman Catholic to be appointed Lord High Commissioner to the General Assembly of the Church of Scotland, the British Monarch's representative to the Assembly. She held the role again at the 2026 General Assembly.

The Assembly also has "members" separate from the Commissioners – mainly officials who sit at the clerks' table:

- The Principal Clerk who advises on church law and procedure;
- The Depute Clerk who records the minutes and assists the Principal Clerk
- The Procurator, the Kirk's chief legal adviser (always KC, a senior Advocate)
- The Solicitor, who also advises on legal issues
- The Convener and Vice-Convener of the Assembly's Business Committee
- The minutes recorder, who assists the Depute Clerk

In 2022 Rev Fiona Smith became the Principal Clerk. She was the first woman to hold the office after about forty men who have held the position since 1572. In May 2026, the Rev Dr Alistair May took up the appointment of Principal Clerk.

== See also ==
- General Assembly's Institution, now the Scottish Church College
