= Moderator of the General Assembly of the Church of Scotland =

Official in the Church of Scotland

- Flag of the Church of Scotland
- Incumbent; The Rt Revd Gordon Kennedy since 15 May 2026
- Style: The Right Reverend
- Member of: Standing Committee of the Church of Scotland
- Reports to: Standing Committee of the Church of Scotland
- Residence: 2 Rothesay Terrace, Edinburgh
- Nominator: Committee to Nominate the Moderator
- Appointer: General Assembly of the Church of Scotland
- Term length: 1 year
- Formation: 1562; 464 years ago
- First holder: John Knox

The moderator of the General Assembly of the Church of Scotland is the minister or elder chosen to moderate (chair) the annual General Assembly of the Church of Scotland, which is held for a week in Edinburgh every year. After chairing the Assembly, the Moderator then spends the following year representing the Church of Scotland at civic events, and visiting congregations and projects in Scotland and beyond.

As the Church of Scotland is a presbyterian church, meaning it has no bishops or other such religious leaders, the Moderator is one of the highest figures of authority in the Church of Scotland, arguably alongside the Lord High Commissioner to the General Assembly of the Church of Scotland.

The current Moderator is The Rt Revd Gordon Kennedy, minister of Craiglockhart Church in Edinburgh.

== Office ==
=== Selection ===
The moderator can be any minister, deacon or elder, within the Church of Scotland. Whoever is selected as moderator is often of considerable experience and held in high esteem in the Church of Scotland. The moderator is nominated by the "Committee to Nominate the Moderator", which consists of twelve people elected annually - comprising eleven ministers and elders, and one deacon. The moderator must then be formally elected by the General Assembly; this is done in the opening session, and is in practice a formality. A new moderator is elected each year, and usually announced in October.

In 2004 Alison Elliot became the first woman (and first elder for approximately 400 years) to be elected Moderator. Three years later Sheilagh M. Kesting became the first woman minister to be elected to the office. In total, there have been six female moderators.

Moderators who also serve as a minister are styled the Right Reverend during the term of office and the Very Reverend thereafter. This gives no further status beyond that of teaching elder.

=== Official residence ===
The Moderator has an official residence at Number 2 Rothesay Terrace in Edinburgh's West End.

=== Role in coronations ===
The Moderator first took part in the Coronation of the British monarch in 1953. The then-Moderator, James Pitt-Watson, presented a Bible to Queen Elizabeth II, saying:

"Here is wisdom; This is the royal law; These are the lively Oracles of God."

During the Coronation of Charles III in 2023, the then-Moderator, Iain Greenshields once again presented a Bible to The King, saying:

"Sir, to keep you ever mindful of the law and the Gospel of God as the Rule for the whole life and government of Christian Princes, receive this Book, the most valuable thing that this world has to offer. Here is Wisdom; this is the royal Law; these are the lively Oracles of God."

== Coat of arms ==
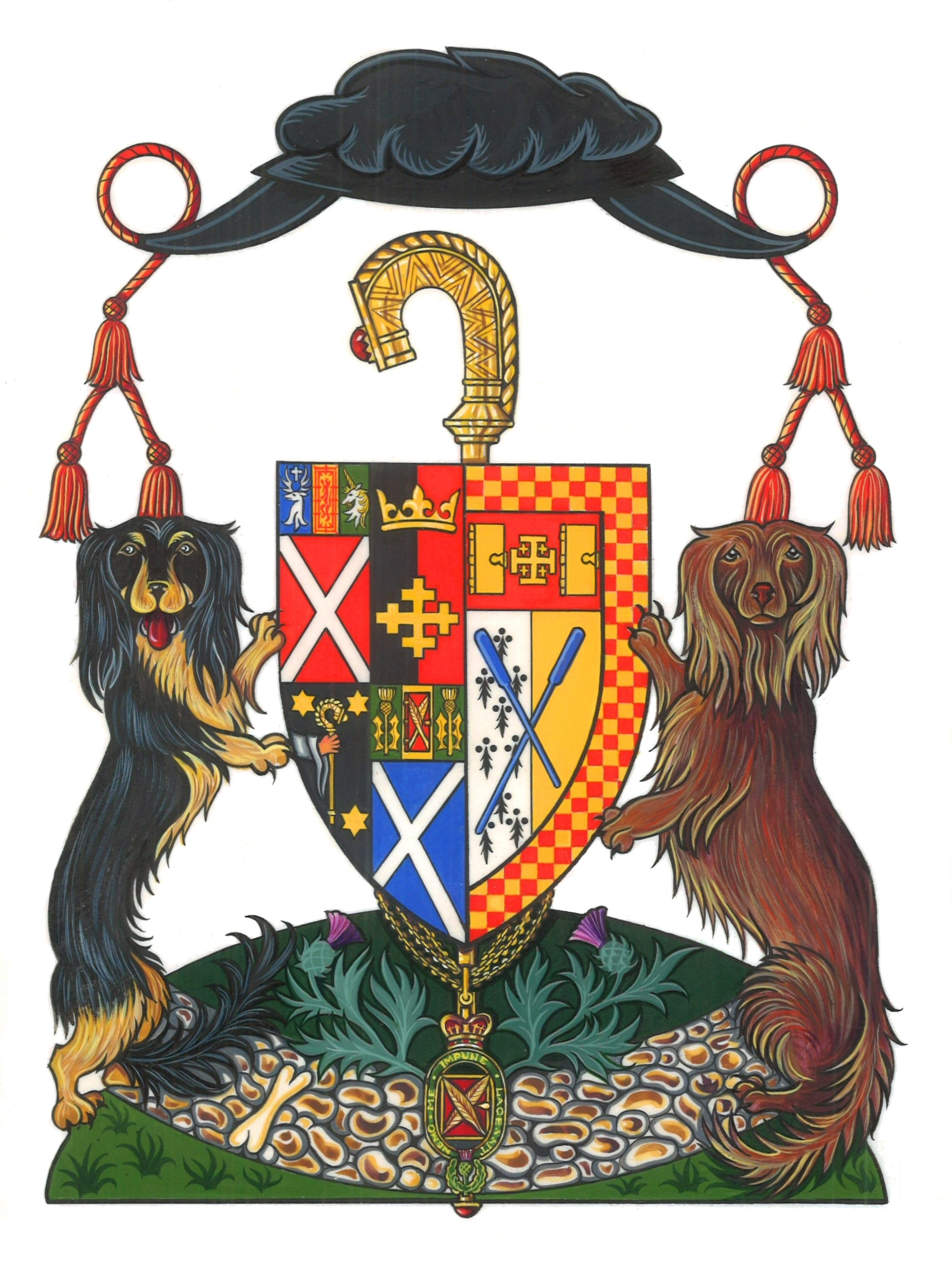
Coat of Arms of Iain R. Torrance, former Moderator, illustrating the Geneva bonnet and the crozier of St. Fillan

The Moderator of the General Assembly of the Church of Scotland has an official coat of arms awarded by the Lord Lyon King of Arms. It includes a shield showing the burning bush, plus the Quigrich - the crozier of St Fillan - behind the shield (with the curved head of the Quigrich visible above the shield). The shield is surmounted by a black Geneva bonnet - closely associated with John Knox. Similar to the coat of arms of an archbishop, there are the addition of twenty blue tassels arranged with ten on each side.

Arms of office shown without crozier of St. Fillan and with the tassels of a presbyter

== Order of precedence ==
By virtue of an Order of Precedence established by King Edward VII the Moderator ranks immediately after a sheriff principal in the sheriff principal's own sheriffdom.

Order of precedence in Scotland
Preceded by Sheriff Principal of that Sheriffdom	United Kingdom Order of Precedence in Scotland (gentlemen)	Succeeded by Keeper of the Great Seal of Scotland

== List of moderators ==
Since 2010, the following have been elected to the position of moderator:

- 2010: John Christie
- 2011: A. David K. Arnott
- 2012: Albert Bogle
- 2013: E. Lorna Hood
- 2014: Angus Morrison; initially nominated but withdrew on health grounds
- 2014: John Chalmers
- 2015: Angus Morrison
- 2016: Russell Barr
- 2017: Derek Browning
- 2018: Susan M. Brown
- 2019: Colin Sinclair
- 2020: Martin Fair
- 2021: Jim Wallace, Baron Wallace of Tankerness
- 2022: Iain Greenshields
- 2023: Sally Foster-Fulton
- 2024: Shaw Paterson
- 2025: Rosemary Frew
- 2026: Gordon Kennedy

== See also ==
- Moderator of the General Assembly
