= Hogback (sculpture) =

Stone carved Anglo-Scandinavian sculpture

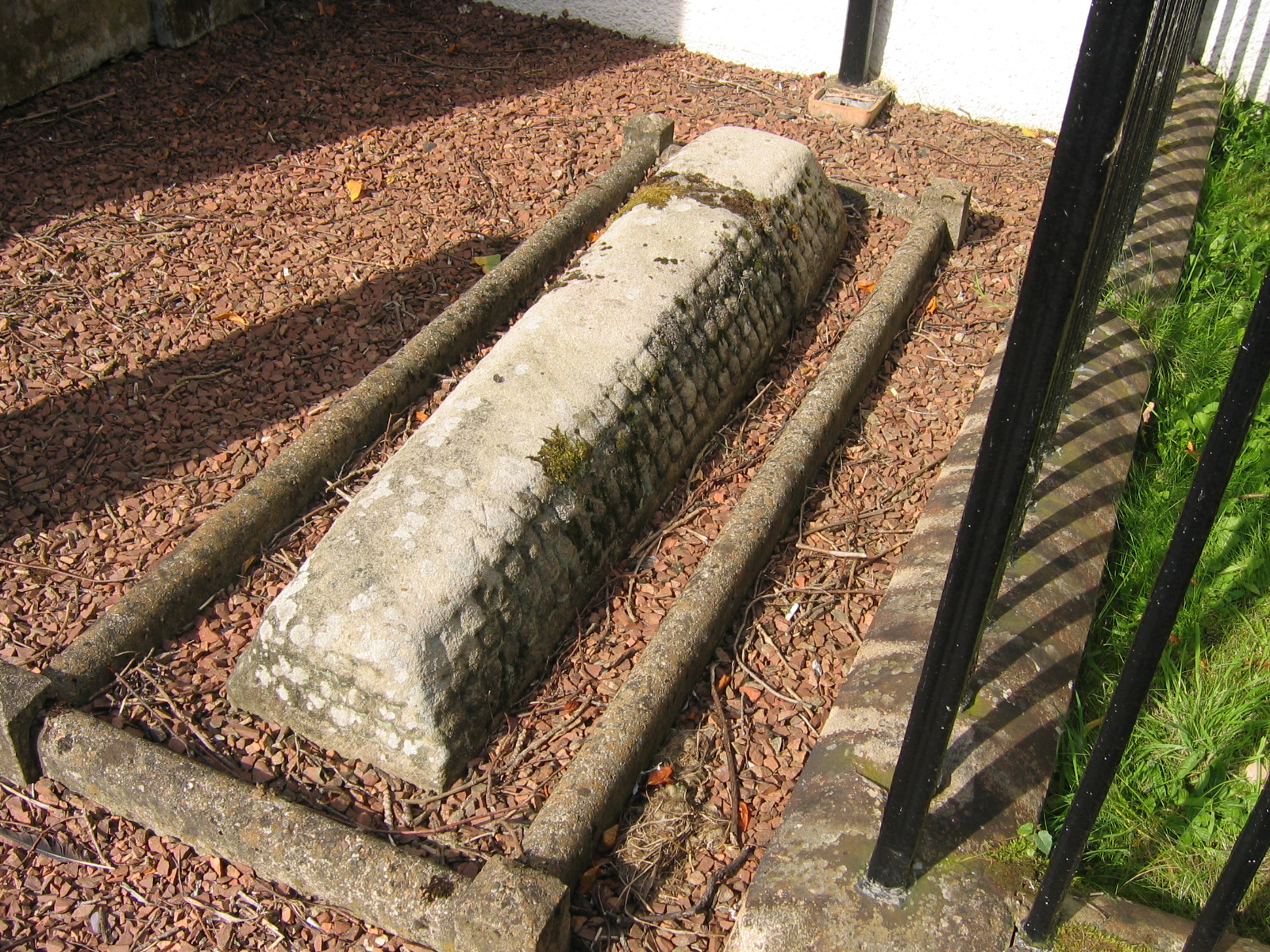
A hogback in Dalserf Churchyard in South Lanarkshire, Scotland; the stone was found on the site in 1897. The patterned carvings are thought to represent wooden roof shingles.

Hogbacks are stone carved Anglo-Scandinavian style sculptures from 10th- to 12th-century northern England and south-west Scotland. Singular hogbacks were found in Ireland and Wales. Hogbacks fell out of fashion by the beginning of the 11th century. Their function is generally accepted as grave markers. Similar later grave markers have been found in Scandinavia. In Cornwall similar stones are known as coped stones.

== Geography and description ==
Hogbacks take the form of recumbent monuments, generally with a curved ('hogbacked') ridge, often also with outwardly curved sides. This shape, and the fact that they are frequently decorated with 'shingles' on either side of the central ridge, show that they are stylised 'houses' for the dead. The 'house' is of a Scandinavian longhouse type associated with mead hall feasting at Valhalla in Old Norse religion. One theory is that hogbacks originated among Danes who emigrated to northern England in the 870s. However, there is not sufficient research to prove or disprove this. The monuments at Govan and Penrith are associated with local native British Cumbric speaking rulers of the period.

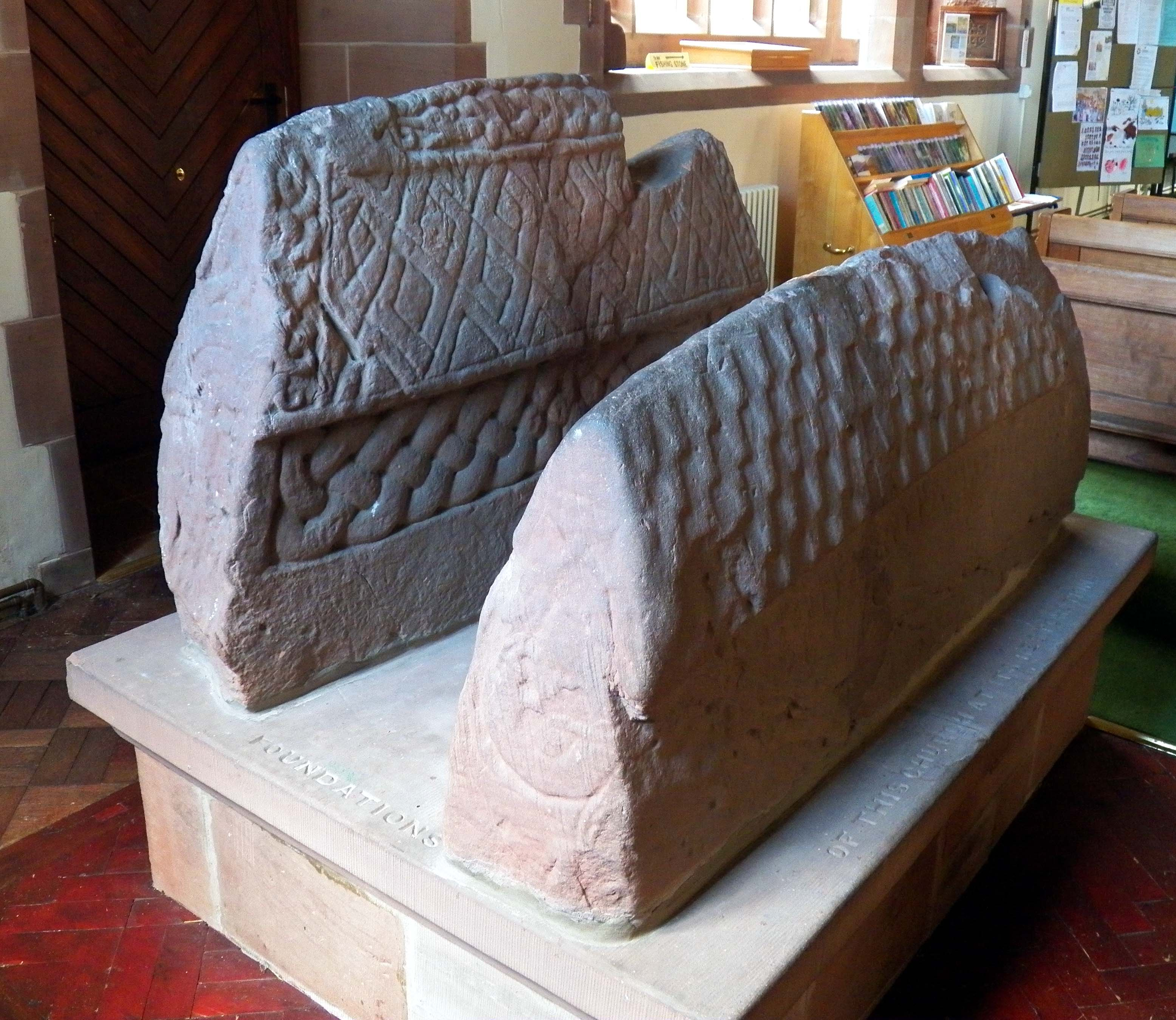
Hogbacks conserved in St Mary's Church, Gosforth, Cumbria

It has been suggested that the monument type was invented about 920. There are particular concentrations of hogbacks in Yorkshire, Cumbria, and in the Govan Stones collection at the former Govan Old Parish Church in Govan on the River Clyde – the first being their likely area of origin. Individual examples are found over a much wider area, however, from Derbyshire to Central Scotland.

The presence of hogbacks in Scotland is likely due to the Forth-Clyde route, which connected York to Dublin. Most hogback sites in Scotland are along waterway routes. There are stray examples as far afield as the Northern Isles and Orkney.

Ireland has a single example at Castledermot, County Kildare, which is similar to two hogbacks in Ingleby Arncliffe, North Yorkshire.

Wales has a single example of a hogback at Llanddewi Aberarth, a Norman church.

The most numerous collections are the ones preserved in St Thomas's church at Brompton, Northallerton. Discovered in 1867 following the restoration of the church, six were taken to Durham Dean and Chapter Library, leaving four whole ones and fragments of others at Brompton. They are characterized by carvings of bears hugging the slabs with strapwork in their mouths. Elsewhere, five impressive examples found in the early medieval churchyard of Govan Old are in the Govan Stones museum, situated in Govan Old Parish Church in Glasgow. There is a fine example in the visitor centre on Inchcolm in the Firth of Forth. The excellent and highly decorated Heysham hogback is in St Peter's Church, Heysham.

== Typology ==
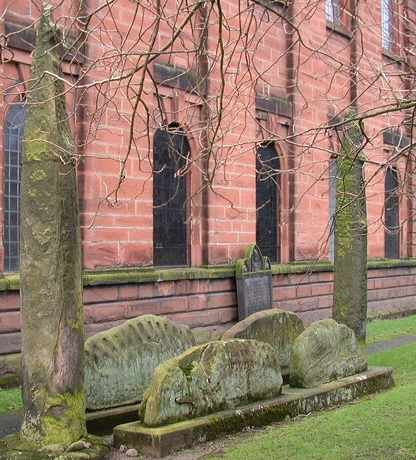
Hogbacks outside St Andrew's Church in Penrith, Cumbria.

There are two main types of hogbacks. One is the Brompton type, which is characterized by massive end beasts. The other type is the warrior's tomb, which looks more like a house. It does not have massive end beasts. Within the two main groups of hogback styles are smaller subsets. The scroll type hogback is a subset of the warrior's tomb type. It is characterized by scroll motifs on the horizontal band below the tegulation.

Different older types of carved stone monuments found in northern Britain include the 8th century St Andrews Sarcophagus and the Ancient Roman sarcophagi found in York.

== Hogbacks at Govan ==
Govan sits on the south bank of the River Clyde, and was the Christian centre of the Clyde Britons and the Kingdom of Strathclyde. It has the four largest known hogbacks. There are five hogbacks in the Govan Stones museum at Govan Old Parish Church. The earliest, known as 'Govan 2', has been dated to the tenth century. It has two rows of tegulation with concave, contoured lines. It has a band of interlace beneath the rows of shingles. The interlace pattern is not the same on either side. It is not continuous on either side. This is the only hogback at Govan with stopped-plait interlacing. The stopped plait on this hogback is characterized by a series of small, separated elements with pellet fillers. It also has a running ring-knot interlace with frets. On the other side, the sections of four-cord plait are stylistically reduced to a contoured diagonal bar crossed with a bar and four small pellets flanking it.

The later four hogbacks at Govan are dated to the later 10th century. The longest hogback at Govan does not have the decorative motifs that its earlier brother has. It is covered in rows of shingles, but they are not contoured. It is wider with a shallower roof pitch. The third hogback is massive. It has a full-bodied, three-dimensional end-beast with legs. This single animal straddles the monument from one end to the other. The fourth hogback is also characterized by a single end-beast. Its head faces outward, an uncommon feature in hogbacks. The animal's four bent legs point toward its head. The roof ridges resemble a spine, and the rows of tegulation are like scales. The fifth hogback has two end-beasts, one at either end. The beasts' faces and bodies are shown in profile with jaws gaping open, their legs intersecting along the base. This is the only known hogback with end-beasts in this position.

== Coped stones ==
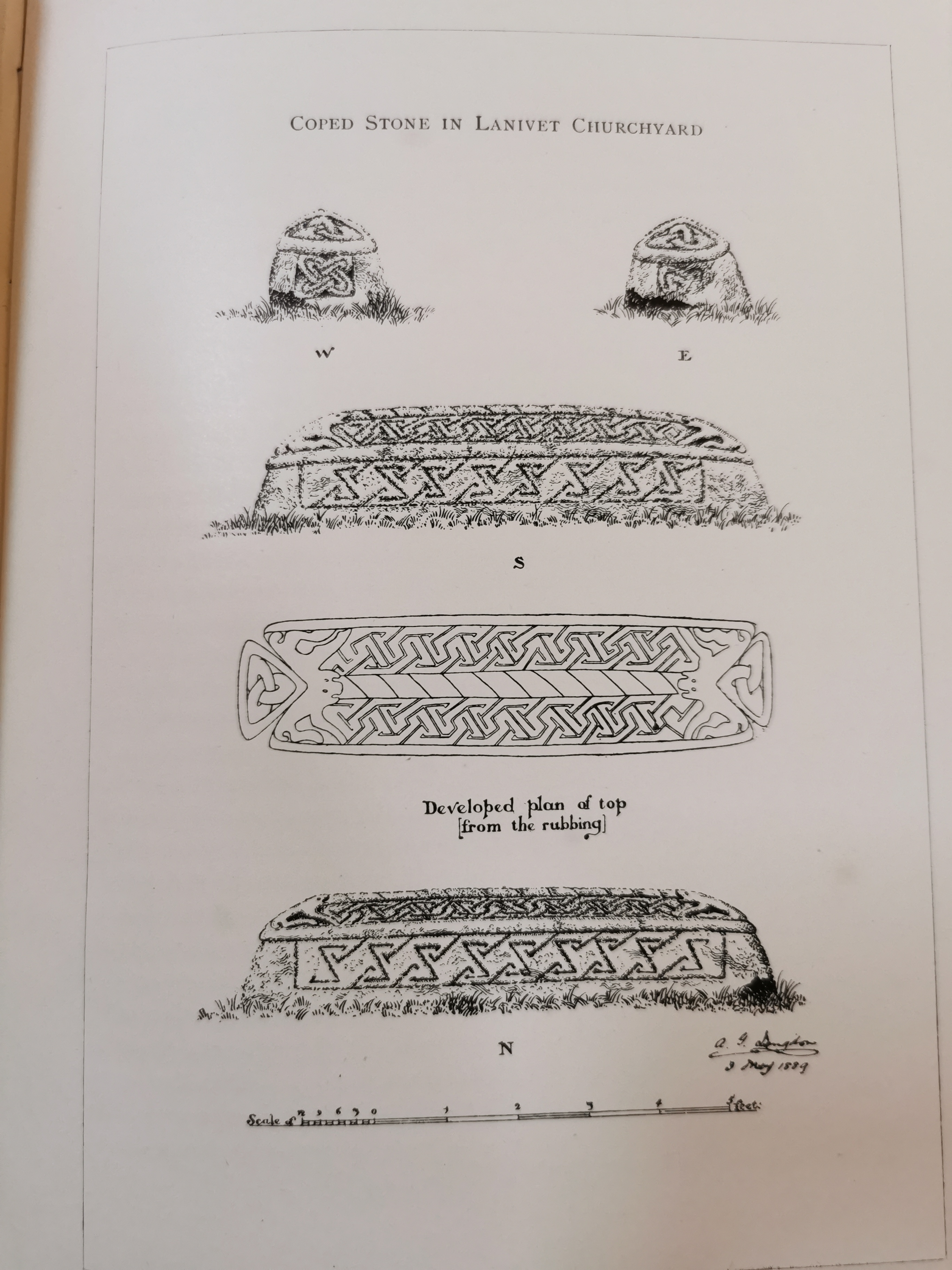
Lanivet Coped Stone, Cornwall

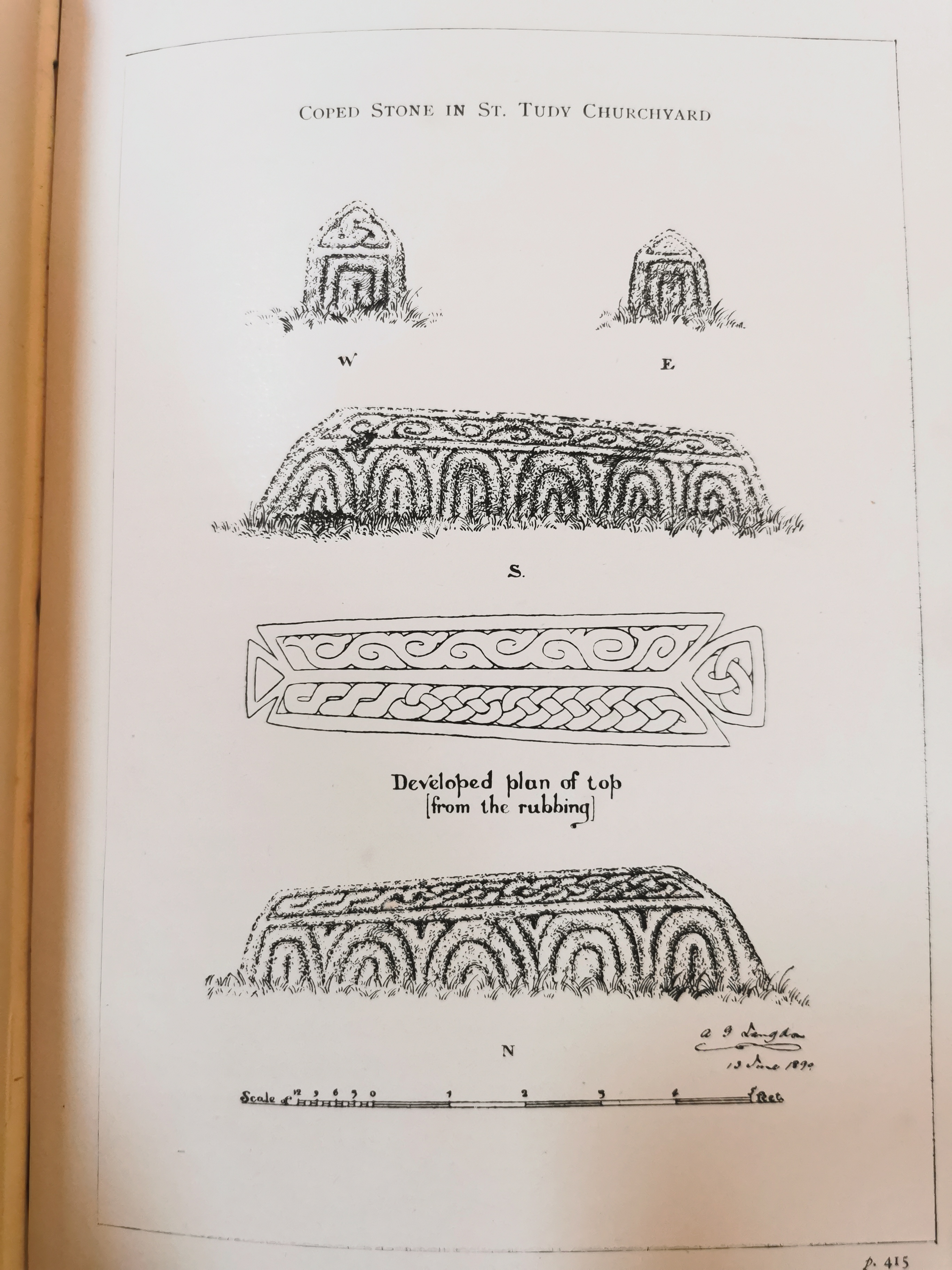
St Tudy Coped Stone, Cornwall

In Cornwall grave markers of the hogback type are known as coped stones. There are five known coped stones surviving, varying in their resemblance to hogbacks found elsewhere. One is found in St Buryan, another in Lanivet a third at Phillack, a fourth at St Tudy and in 2012 a fifth was excavated in Padstow. Cornish coped stones tend to be longer than normal hogbacks at over 2 metres in length, but shorter in height, and have an unusual hipped roof style. The Lanivet stone is the only known hogback in Cornwall to have beasts carved on the ends. The stones show both Scandinavian and local Cornish influence in their designs, indicating the inclusion of Cornwall in a "western British Viking-age sculptural tradition".

== See also ==
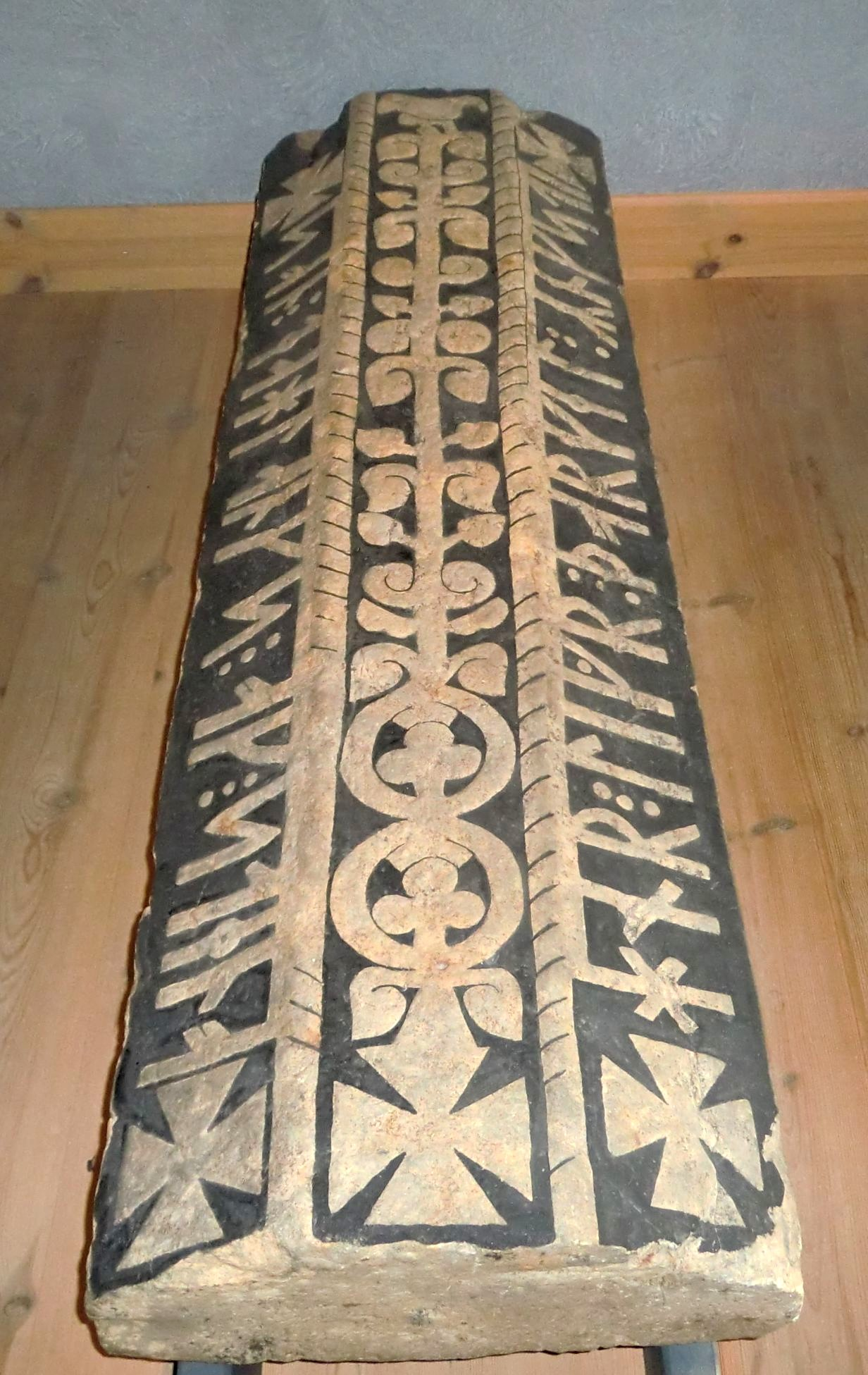
A grave slab of the lily stone type, from Näs Church, Västergötland, Falköping, decorated with a tree of life.

- Anglo-Saxon art § Monumental sculpture and wall painting
- Botkyrka monument
- Eskilstuna cist
- Lily stone
- Västergötland Runic Inscription 81
