= The Govan Stones =

Early medieval carved stones

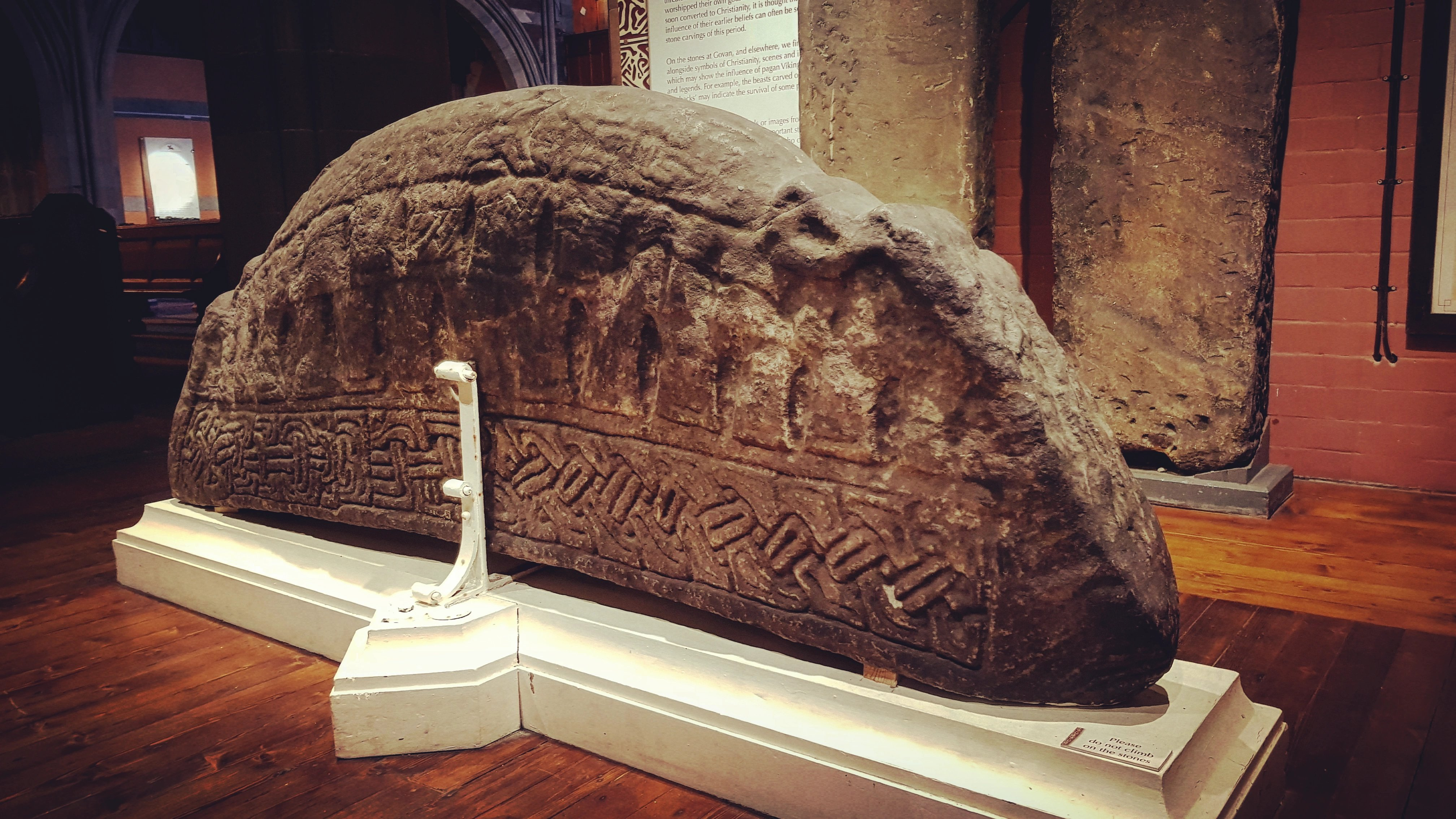
- The Govan 2 hogback in Govan Old Parish Church
- Established: 2007; 19 years ago
- Location: Govan Old Church, 866 Govan Road, Glasgow G51 3UU, Scotland, United Kingdom
- Coordinates: 55.8646°N 4.3129°W
- Key holdings: Collection of 9th to 11th C medieval stones Govan Sarcophagus
- Collection size: 31 monuments
- Owner: Govan Heritage Trust
- Public transit access: Govan
- Website: thegovanstones.org.uk

The Govan Stones is an internationally important museum collection of early medieval carved stones displayed at Govan Old Parish Church in Govan, Glasgow, Scotland.

The carved stones come from the surrounding 1,500-year-old early medieval churchyard and include the Govan Sarcophagus, five Anglo-Scandinavian style Viking-Age hogbacks, four upright crosses, the 'Govan Warrior' carving, and a wide range of recumbent cross-slab burial monuments, with most seemingly dating to between the 9th and 11th centuries AD.

== Description ==
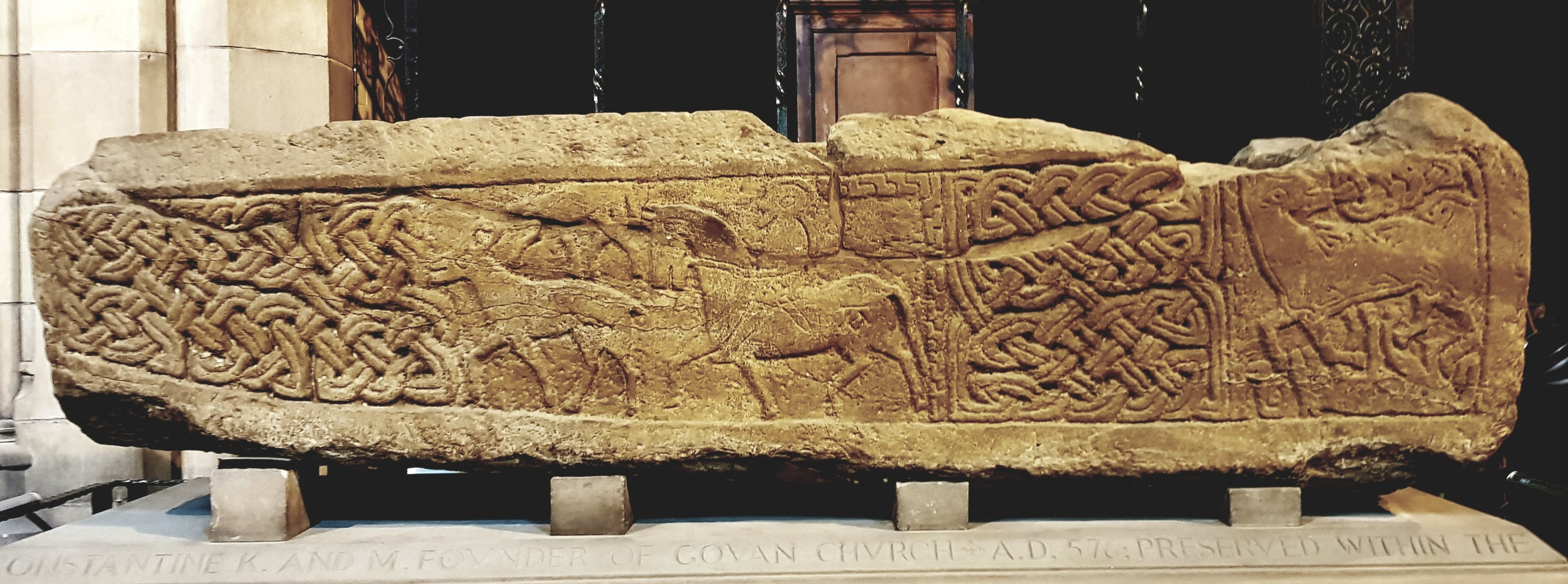
Side of the Viking-Age Govan Sarcophagus, thought to depict a royal saint killed by Vikings in the 870s

The carved stones are thought to have been created to commemorate the power and wealth of the rulers of the Brittonic Kingdom of Strathclyde, which was part of Yr Hen Ogledd ('The Old North').

Forty-five stones existed as late as the 1970s. However, fourteen 'recumbent gravestones' (funerary markers laid flat over the grave), which had not been taken into the church and were lying next to the east wall of the churchyard, were thought to have been destroyed when the neighbouring Harland and Wolff shipyard plating shed was demolished in 1973, with the damaged early medieval stones being mistaken for debris.

Nevertheless, one of these 'lost' stones was rediscovered in 2019 by a fourteen-year-old schoolboy, Mark McGettigan, working as part of the ‘Stones 'n' Bones’ community archaeology and heritage programme. Two more recumbent gravestones were uncovered subsequently, prompting hopes that more of the stones – possibly as many as the fourteen originally thought destroyed – had survived.

As of 2026, excavations of the approximately 1,500-year-old Govan Old graveyard are continuing, with new early medieval carved stones being uncovered by teams led by Prof. Stephen Driscoll of University of Glasgow Archaeology and Clyde Archaeology.

Notable recent finds include a fragment known as the 'Govan Warrior,' which was discovered in September of 2023 in the south-east corner of the graveyard, an area where excavations are unearthing an early medieval gravel roadway. In 2024, a fragment of median-incised interlace, typical of existing examples in the collection, such as the Govan Sarcophagus, was excavated. In 2025, a large posthole containing packing stones was uncovered in the vicinity of the roadway.

The remaining carved stones are the Govan Sarcophagus, five hogback stones (of a Viking-Age type originating in Anglo-Scandinavian Yorkshire), four standing crosses and twenty-one recumbents.

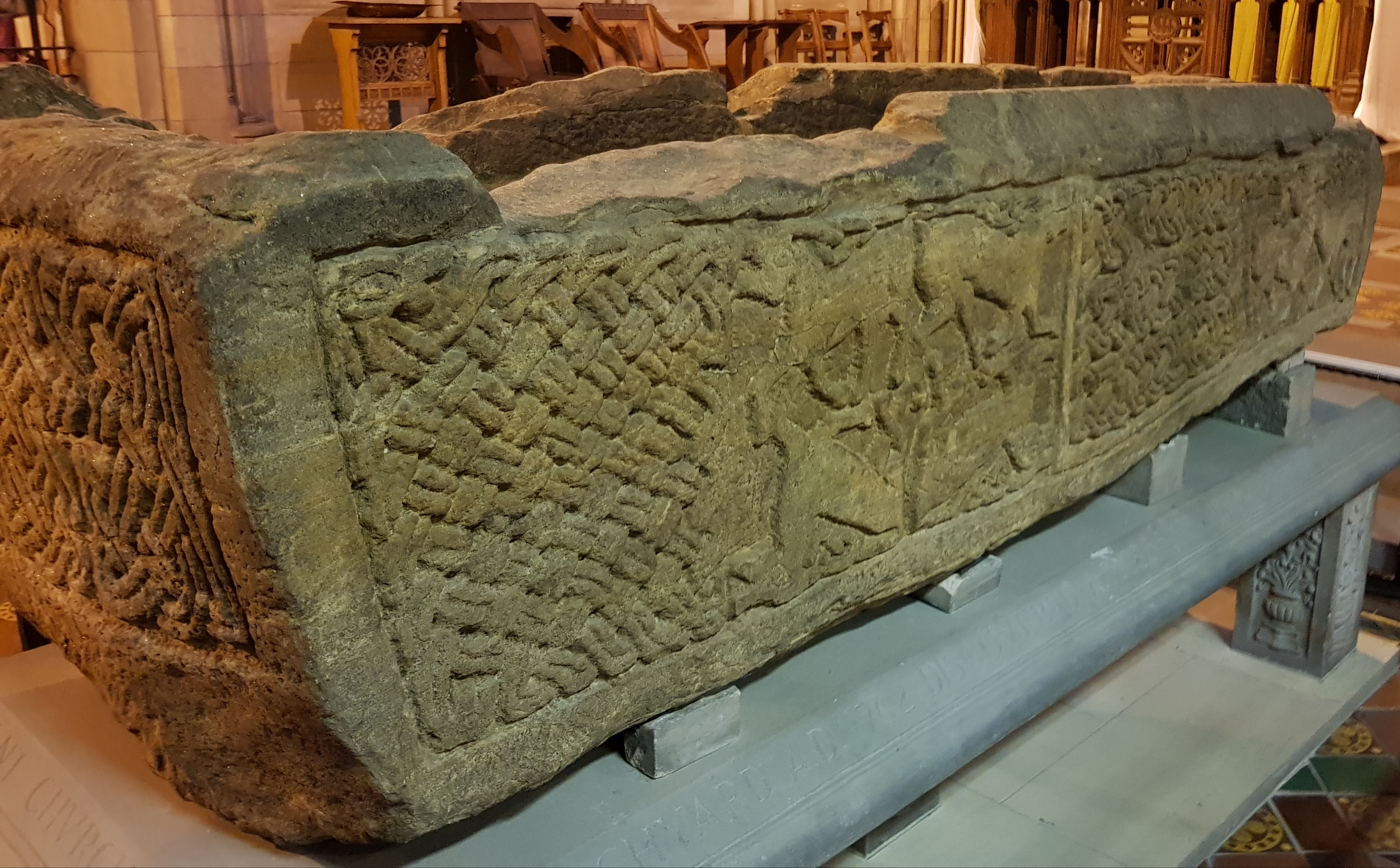
A side of the Govan Sarcophagus, with animal and interlace carvings

The centrepiece of the collection is the Govan Sarcophagus, which is thought to commemorate St. Constantine, the son of Pictish king Kenneth MacAlpin. It features carvings of a Pictish-style stag hunting scene and various stylised animals. Carved from solid sandstone, the sarcophagus is the only one of its kind from pre-Norman, Northern Britain.

== History ==
The stones have been dated back to the 9th–11th centuries, a period when Vikings raided the Clyde region and the territories beyond. The contemporary Annals of Ulster tell us that Vikings destroyed the Clyde Britons' twin citadel at Dumbarton Rock, strategically located at the confluence of the Clyde and Leven rivers, in AD 870 after a four-month siege. This fortress, known as Alt Clut or Alt Clud in the local Northern Brittonic (Cumbric) language, was the centre of an ancient Brittonic kingdom.

With the king of Alt Clut, Artgal, either killed or enslaved by the Vikings, Govan and Partick, further up the river, gained great strategic importance as a new dynasty was established for the successor realm, known as the Kingdom of Strathclyde ('the valley of the Clyde'). Govan, already an ancient Christian site with burials dating back to AD 450-600, became an important ecclesiastical centre for this new kingdom.

The presence of the five 'hogback' stones in Govan suggests regions around the Clyde and Leven were influenced or settled by Vikings (as certainly occurred at Loch Lomond) in the period after 870.

These large sandstone blocks, seemingly designed to resemble Scandinavian longhouses, were found exclusively in areas of northern Britain where Vikings settled. Nowhere else are there hogback stones quite as large as the five in Govan.

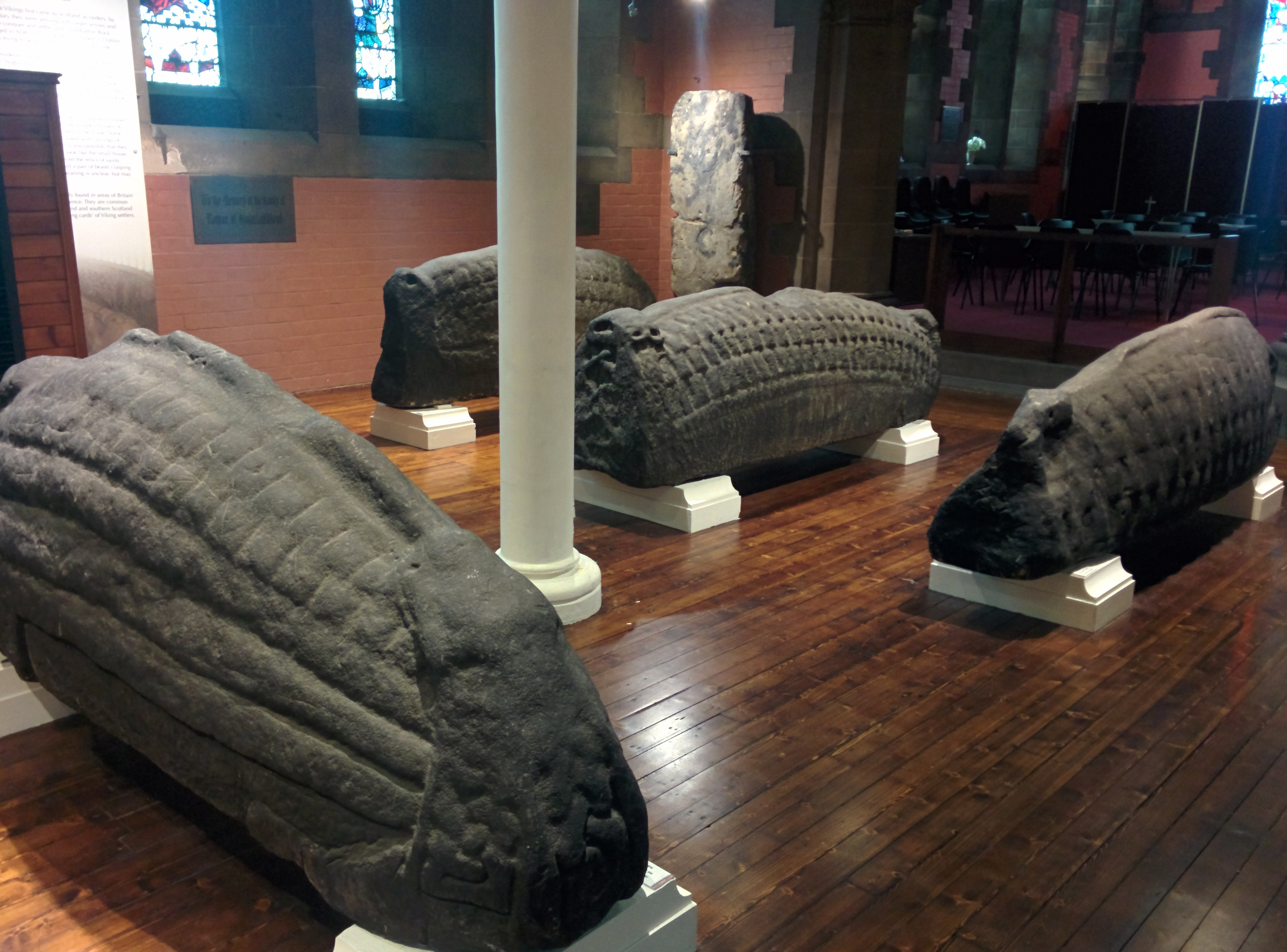
Hogback stones within the (ecclesiastical) north transept

"It underpins this idea that this British kingdom of Strathclyde has some strong connections with the Scandinavian world. My feeling is that this is meant to represent a lord's hall or a chieftain's hall." - Stephen Driscoll, Professor of Historical Archaeology at Glasgow University.

The sarcophagus was discovered in Govan Old's graveyard in 1855, when a grave was being dug to the south east of the church. Recognising their significance and to protect the stones from the elements, they were moved from the surrounding graveyard and placed on display within the church itself in 1926. Until that point, the stones had lain in the churchyard for over a thousand years.

== Creation of the site ==
It is believed that the site's earliest Christian activity began sometime between the early 5th and early 6th century AD.

Archaeological excavations in the 1990s uncovered two early Christian burials beneath the foundations of a later church; these burials were radiocarbon-dated between the 5th and 6th centuries AD (435-601 and 474-601).

Despite this early activity, it wasn't until the 9th and 10th centuries that Govan Old rose to prominence: indeed, there are few historical references to Govan in the interim, though there appears to be one reference included in Symeon of Durham's Historia Regum, compiled sometime in the 12th century AD. In it, Simeon records the return of the Northumbrian army from 'Ovania' after attacking Dumbarton Rock (Alt Clut) in AD 756.

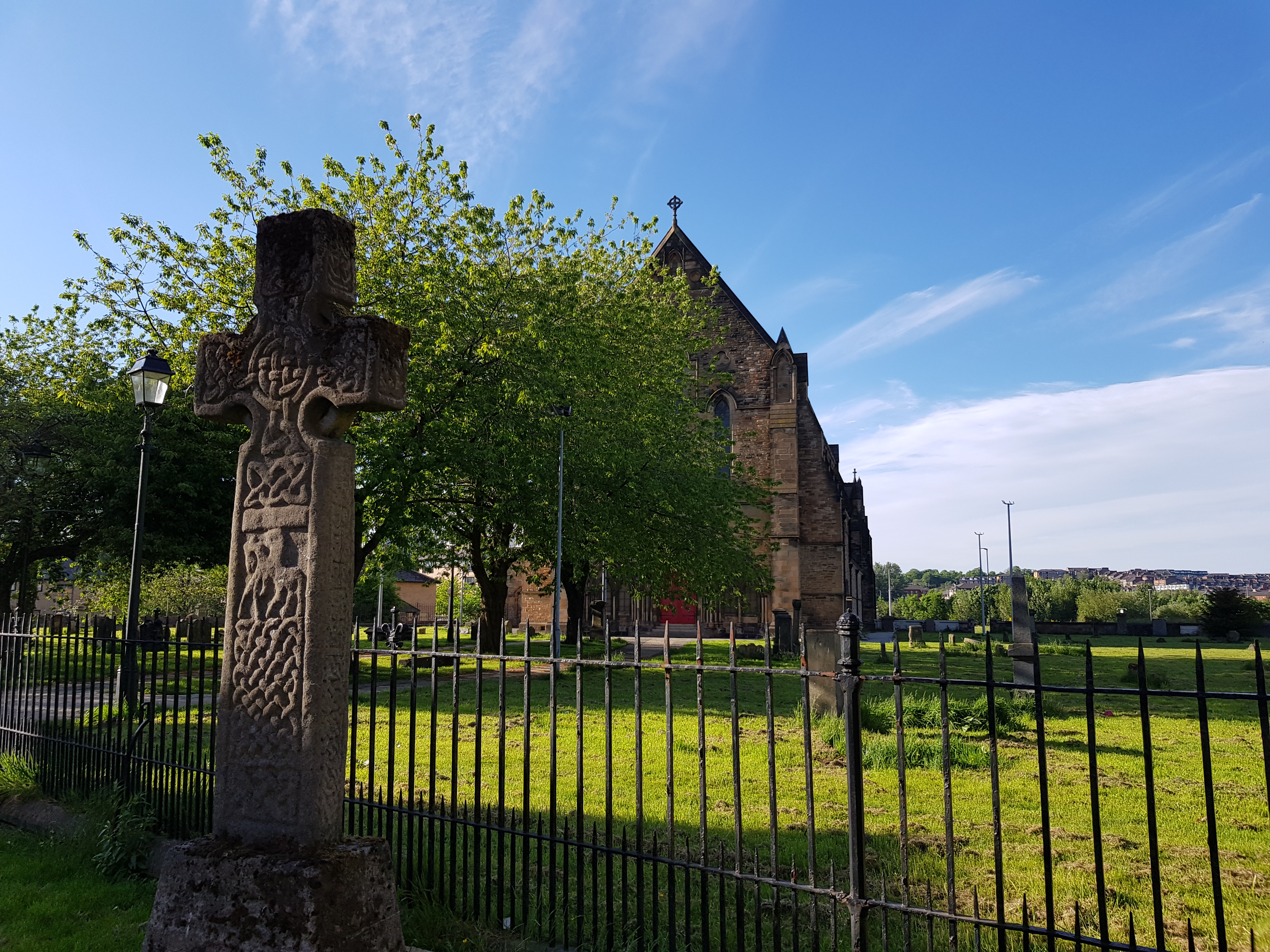

Originally, the Annals of Ulster recorded Dumbarton Rock as the centre of the Brittonic Kingdom of Alt Clud (usually pre-emptively referred to as the Kingdom of Strathclyde, but which is more accurately described as ‘the kingdom of the Rock of the Clyde’) from the 6th century AD until the later 9th century AD.

In AD 870, the Annals of Ulster record a Viking raid on Dumbarton Rock; after this point, the kings of Clyde Rock are no longer discussed.

In 872, the Annals of Ulster instead refer to the kingdom of Ystrad Clud, better known as the Kingdom of Strathclyde, which appears to mark the shift of political power from Dumbarton Rock further upstream to Govan.

It is possible that a predecessor of the 12th-century royal estate at Partick and the now-destroyed Doomster or Dempster Hill (thought to have functioned as a Viking-style 'thing' site or moot/meeting place, having been adapted from a possible Bronze-Age burial mound) played a part in this power shift.

The size of the graveyard and the sheer amount of early medieval sculpture suggest that the church was supported by royal patronage. Because the site has been in continual use since it was first established, it is difficult to tell what the original church looked like, but excavations in the 1990s revealed the foundations of a wall next to the south-east corner of the present building.

Based on depth and method of construction, it is thought that these foundations, which consist of boulders placed in a trench with smaller stones used to create a level surface, supported an early medieval wooden church .

== The Govan Sarcophagus ==
The Govan Sarcophagus is a monumental stone coffin with an ornately carved exterior; it was rediscovered when the church sexton was digging a grave in the south-east corner of the churchyard in December 1855, surrounded by roots from two elm trees.

No human remains were found with the sarcophagus, so it is thought that it was buried at an earlier date to protect the monument, perhaps during the Scottish Reformation when iconoclasm was common practice. Today, the sarcophagus is on prominent display in the Govan Stones museum.

The sarcophagus is supposed to have been dedicated to the patron saint of the church, St Constantine. There is much debate over which Constantine is the patron, and whether it is Constantine of Strathclyde, but most scholars agree that the coffin most likely would have been dedicated to Causantín mac Cináeda (AD 862–877) or Donald f. Constantine (889–900).

Because of its highly decorated exterior, it is assumed that the coffin was meant to display the remains of the saint as a focal piece in the church.

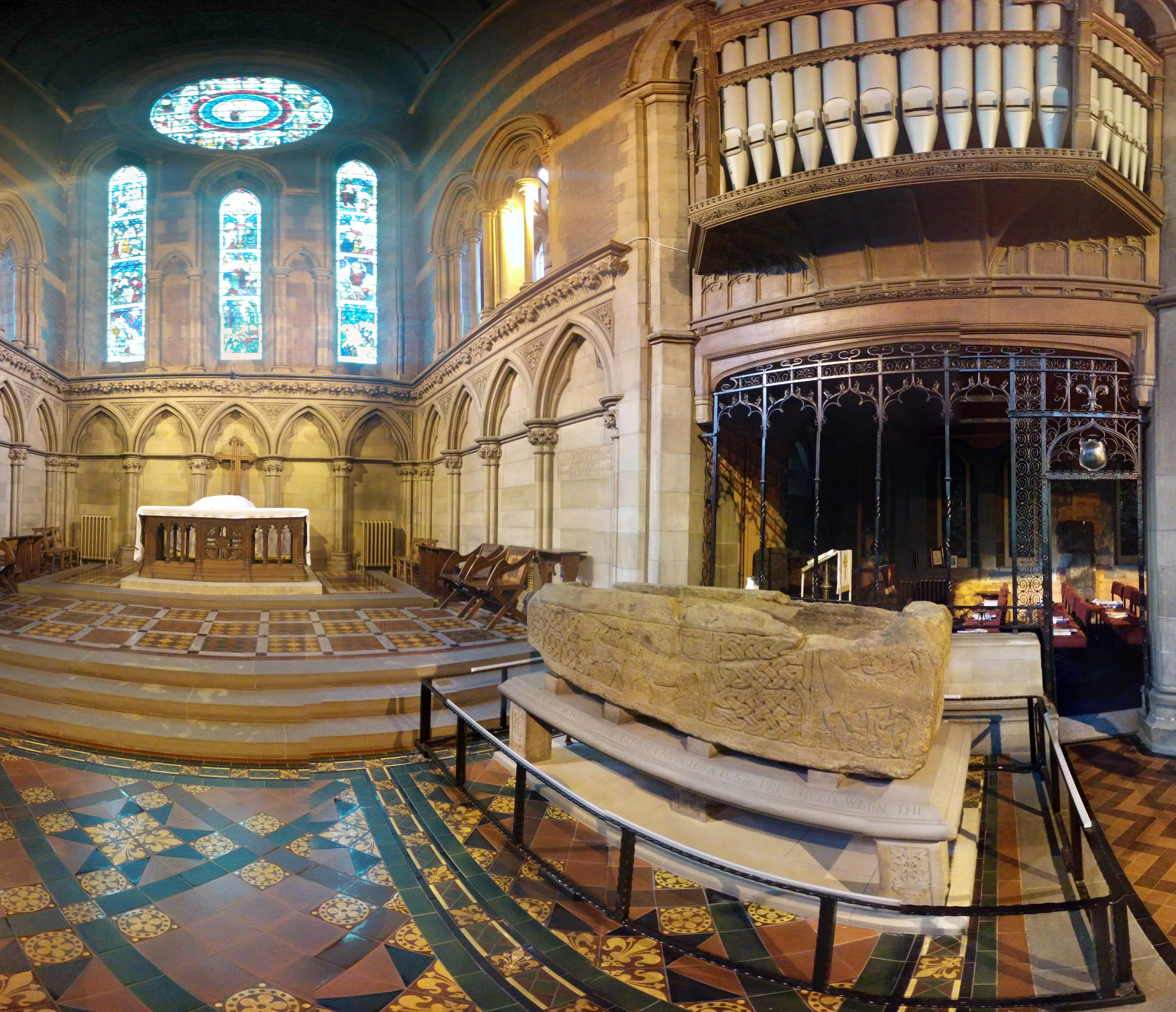
Govan, carved sarcophagus with Old Parish Church, generally linked with Saint Constantine

The coffin itself depicts Insular iconography, taking inspiration from different styles that were then popular in the Irish Sea Region.

One face of the sarcophagus shows a hunting scene of a horseman chasing a stag, perhaps accompanied by a dog, a motif frequently used in Pictish art that is thought to convey an association with royalty and power.

The sarcophagus also shows an animal trampling another two creatures: a snake and what may be a wolf; the angular decoration of the triumphant animal has led many scholars to suggest that this is a ‘Lamb of God’ motif.

Two panels depicting beasts in various configurations are found on the other long face of the sarcophagus: in one, four ‘beasts’ are pseudo-mirrored across the vertical and horizontal axes of the panel, though there are differences in each beast's design.

In the second panel, two long-necked animals cross necks and interlace their tongue/ears with the other beast's tail; similar motifs, where beasts cross legs, necks, or other body parts, can also be found in Pictish sculpture.

The rest of the space on the sarcophagus is filled with panels of median-incised interlace, some of which represent snakes, which a relatively common motif in Insular sculpture, thought to be a symbol of death and resurrection.

== Govan Hogbacks ==
There are five hogbacks at in the Govan Stones museum at Govan Old Parish Church.

While the earliest Govan hogback, known as Govan 2, is considered to date to the early 10th century, the later four hogbacks are thought to date to later in the 10th.

The five hogbacks in Govan Old are generally known as Govan 2, Govan 3, Govan 4, Govan 5 and Govan 6. All were discovered within the footprint of Govan Old's early medieval churchyard.

- Govan 2 is the smallest (2m in length), and probably oldest, of the Govan hogbacks. It was lent to the British Museum in 2014. It has been dated to the early 10th century. It has two rows of tegulation with concave, contoured lines. It has a band of interlace beneath the rows of shingles. The interlace pattern is not the same on either side. It is not continuous on either side. This is the only hogback at Govan with stopped-plait interlacing. The stopped plait on this hogback is characterized by a series of small, separated elements with pellet fillers. It also has a running ring-knot interlace with frets. On the other side, the sections of four-cord plait are stylistically reduced to a contoured diagonal bar crossed with a bar and four small pellets flanking it.
- Govan 3 has been re-carved at some point in its history, although likely still in the early medieval period. The re-carving appears designed to make the stone resemble a single beast. Originally, it may have looked similar to the Brompton hogbacks, with large beasts gripping the ends of the stone. Govan 3 is massive. It has a full-bodied, 3-dimensional end-beast with legs. This single animal straddles the monument from one end to the other.
- Govan 4 has, in a similar manner to Govan 3, been re-carved, particularly crudely, to look like a single beast. Govan 4 is also characterized by a single end-beast. Its head faces outward, an uncommon feature in hogbacks. The animal's four bent legs point toward its head. The roof ridges resemble a spine and the rows of tegulation are like scales.
- Govan 5 has a pair of gripping beasts on the panels at both ends, although one end is very worn. Traces of Govan School interlace surround the panels, which may represent the backs of the beasts. There is a pronounced roughly circular depression in the centre top of this stone, which seems to post-date the early medieval period. The tegulation, seemingly designed to resemble wooden roof shingles or tiles, on this hogback is in good condition. Govan 5 has two end-beasts, one at either end. The beasts' faces and bodies are shown in profile with jaws gaping open, their legs intersecting along the base. This is the only known hogback with end-beasts in this position.
- Govan 6 is much eroded, presumably largely due to its long exposure to the elements. The tegulation is distinctive, with concave sides. Despite the weathering, one end appears to have a dragon- or serpent-like beast that faces outwards from the end of the ridge. A matching design may have graced the opposite end, but this has been removed, either accidentally, or as part of the process seen on Govan 3 and Govan 4, whereby the end-beasts were recarved or removed to make the hogback as a whole resemble a single large beast. It is 2.4m in length. As with Govan 3 and Govan 4, Govan 6 may have had its original end-beasts or end panels removed and recarved to make it into a single front-facing creature.

== Crosses and upright cross-slabs ==
Two cross-shafts and two upright cross-slabs are also on display in the museum.

The cross-shafts include the Govan Cross, also known as the 'Jordanhill' Cross, and the Inverted (or Upside Down) Cross. These would have been decorated on all four faces and, when whole, would have been part of a free-standing cross, probably in a form similar to the more intact Barochan Cross, now housed at Paisley Museum.

The Govan Cross is often referred to as the Jordanhill Cross because it was gifted to the residents of Jordanhill House at some point when one of the churches was being replaced, though there are conflicting accounts as to when this took place. It was brought back to Govan Old in 1928. The cross is decorated with different variants of median-incised interlace, though its most notable feature is an eroded man on horseback that has lost much of its detail apart from the eyes of both horse and man.

The ‘Inverted’ or ‘Upside Down’ cross is so named because it is currently displayed upside down next to the hogback stones in the (ecclesiastical) north transept. Though most of the details on the broad face of the cross facing the visitor has been damaged or eroded, the two side faces are comparatively well-preserved. These are mostly decorated with median-incised interlace, though this also retains the only figural sculpture that can be interpreted as a biblical scene – possibly David being anointed by Samuel.

The two upright cross-slabs include the so-called Sun Stone and Cuddy Stane. The Sun Stone is heavily eroded, but it is decorated with a large boss from which emerge four snakes, arranged in such a way that it appears sun-like, above an angular interlace panel. On the other broad face, it is decorated with a cross, median-incised interlace, and a rider on one face. Though there is a tenon on top of the stone slab, some scholars have argued this was too small to have supported a (stone) cross-head and could indicate that the Sun Stone played an architectural function.

The Cuddy Stane takes its name from its rider's steed, which appears more like a donkey ('cuddy' in Scots language) than a horse. The stone has been damaged since it was illustrated in 1856, which records the rider's upper half, with probable sword and pony tail (the latter also seen on the Sun Stone, the Govan Sarcophagus and the Govan Warrior), and the tenon joint for the presumed cross-head. While the stone appears plain today, this is because it has been severely eroded and was also reused as an Early Modern grave cover with carved initials; hints of a panel of interlace are preserved under the horseman.

== Recumbent cross-slabs ==
The recumbent cross-slabs take up the largest proportion of the Govan Stones collection

21 of the originally recorded 37 are on display, arranged around the interior walls of the church. Unfortunately, these monuments have received less attention relative to the others because they have been differentially worn and liberally reused since at least the 17th century. This is despite similar recumbents being placed in highly-prominent positions in the Christian centre on Iona, suggesting their importance there and, by extension, at Govan.

While the cross-slabs vary in size, in shape and in the decorative motifs used, there are some features they share: they each exhibit a cross with an incised border, which consistently divides the stone into at least two panels. For each stone, there is a plain border that defines the edge of the monument. Finally, of the twenty-one recumbent cross-slabs on display, at least five show evidence for a regionally significant feature known as 'angle-knobs'.

These tombstones have been considered to be of particular importance to any future tourism development and hold great potential.

== Popularity: British Museum Loan and Scotland's Hidden Gem ==
The British Museum affirmed the importance of the collection when they took one of the hogback stones to London as part of the exhibition Vikings: Life and Legend (March 2014 to June 2014).

In August 2017, the Govan Stones were voted Scotland's best 'hidden gem' in a nationwide competition, receiving more than two thousand votes in the nationwide poll. They have been described as of international significance.

== Govan Warrior ==
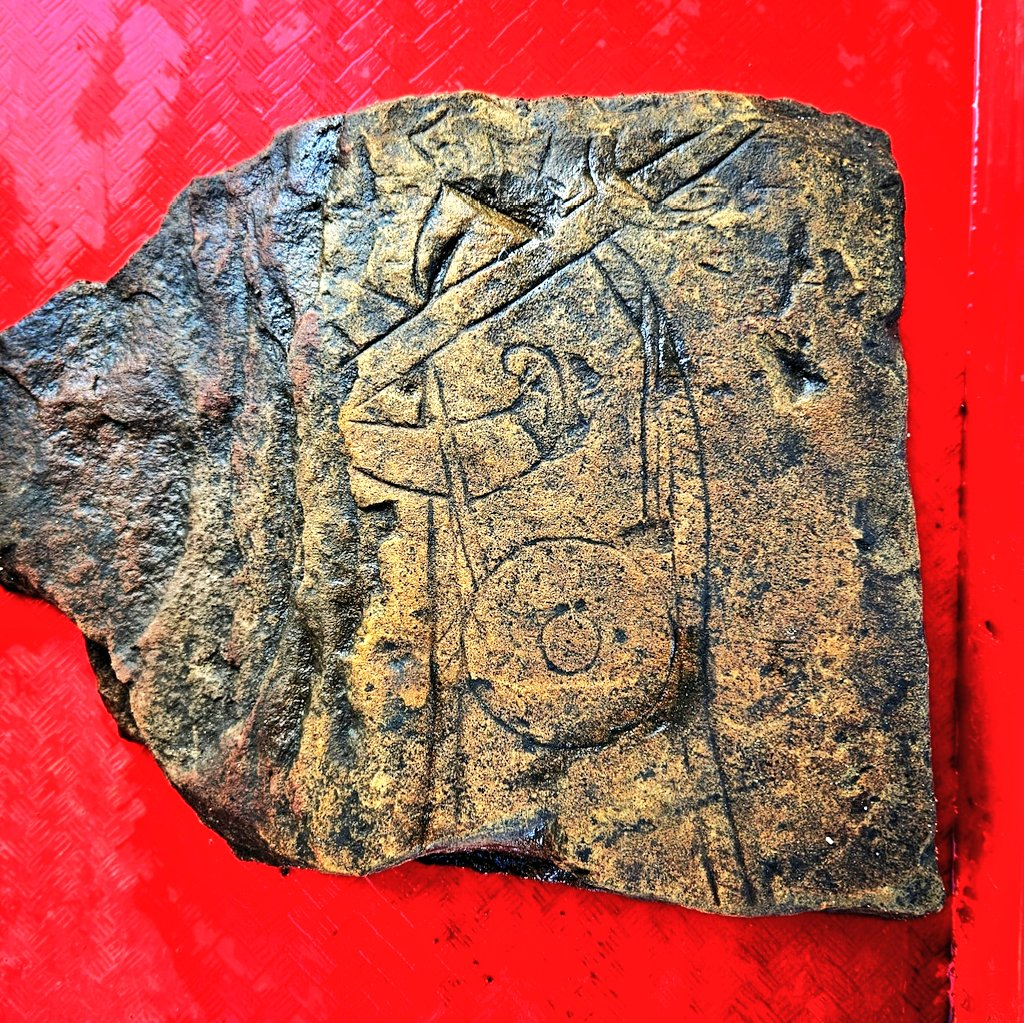

In September 2023, a previously undiscovered early medieval carved stone was discovered by Professor Stephen Driscoll during the re-excavation of an area Prof. Driscoll dug as part of the Time Team programme in 1996.

The stone differs from the other early medieval carved stones in the collection in that it is lightly incised. Although damaged, it depicts what appears to be a warrior, with a small, circular shield held over the shoulder of a side-on human figure via a strap. The person appears to be carrying a staff, spear or sword that is resting on the left shoulder. Much of the face is destroyed, but appears to show a sharply-pointed beard and a pony tail, with the latter aspect known from other stones in the existing collection.

Due to its find location and apparent martial attributes, the figure has been nicknamed the "Govan Warrior".

The excavations and surveys were undertaken by University of Glasgow Archaeology students, Clyde Archaeology and community volunteers.

== The Govan Stones in the Media ==
The Channel 4 archeology programme Time Team dug in the graveyard of the Govan Old in the fourth episode of series 4, recorded in summer 1996 and broadcast early 1997.

In March 2019, ′Stones and Bones′ community archaeologists with a schoolboy named Mark McGettigan revealed long-lost medieval stone carvings. The stones were assumed to have been demolished by chance when the neighbouring Harland & Wolff shipyard plaring shed was demolished in the 1970s.

As Professor Stephen Driscoll noted, "This the most exciting discovery we have had at Govan in the last 20 years. The Govan Stones are a collection of international importance and these recovered stones reinforce the case for regarding Govan as a major early medieval centre of power."

In September 2023, the discovery of the 'Govan Warrior' made national news across a range of media, including newspapers such as The Scotsman, The Herald and the Evening Times, British Archaeology magazine, and on the BBC Scotland news programme, The Nine.

In January 2024, the Govan Early Medieval Podcast (GEMcast) began to feature the Govan Stones and the early medieval Kingdom of Strathclyde and its neighbours. In July 2024, Current Archaeology included the podcast in its What's On listings.
