= New Govan Parish Church =

- Govan & Linthouse Parish Church
- New Govan Parish Church
- 55°51′47″N 4°18′38″W
- Location: Glasgow
- Country: Scotland
- Denomination: Church of Scotland
- Website: Parish Website

History
- Former name: St Mary's Church
- Status: Active
- Founder: Free Church of Scotland

Architecture
- Functional status: Parish church
- Architect: Robert Baldie
- Architectural type: Church
- Style: Neo-Gothic
- Completed: 1873

Specifications
- Capacity: 650

Administration
- Parish: Govan & Linthouse

Listed Building – Category B
- Designated: 15 May 1987
- Reference no.: LB33349

New Govan Parish Church, currently named Govan & Linthouse Parish Church, is a 19th-century church building located in the Govan area of Glasgow, Scotland. It is one of three church buildings of the Parish of Govan & Linthouse, however, it is considered as the main Parish church.

== History and description ==
The church building was founded as St Mary's Free Church. It was designed by Robert Baldie in the Neo-Gothic style, and built in 1873. It was built with a three-gabled façade, which includes three entrance archways, three pointed windows above and a curved window in the gable. A major restoration took place between 2014 and 2018.

=== History of the congregation ===
The original congregation was part of the Free Church of Scotland, until the merger of 1900, when it became a part of the United Free Church of Scotland. After September 1929, the church became part of the Church of Scotland and was renamed St Mary's Church of Scotland. In 1975, the congregation of Fairfield Parish Church united with St Mary's, forming St Mary's Fairfield Church. In April 1982, the congregation of Trinity Govan Parish Church, also united with St Mary's Fairfield, and the church was renamed New Govan Church. The most recent amalgamation took place in 2008, when the two parishes of Govan, Govan Old and Govan New, united with Linthouse, to form the Govan & Linthouse Parish, with the Govan New building serving as the main church, but still retaining use of the Govan Old and Linthouse buildings. Between 2014 and 2018, whilst the Govan new building underwent restoration, the congregation mainly worshiped in the Linthouse building. On the 26th of March 2018, the Govan New building was reopened for use. During autumn of 2020, former minister Elenor McMahon who lead the congregation during the renovation, left and was replaced by minister David Gray who has been there since.
