= Ibis (1886) =

History
- Name: Ibis
- Owner: British Government
- Builder: Fairfield Shipbuilding and Engineering, Govan, Scotland
- Yard number: 295
- Completed: 1886
- Status: Active (2004)
- Notes: Laid up at Cairo

General characteristics
- Class & type: Exploration Vessel
- Propulsion: Stern Paddle

The Ibis was a paddle-propelled steamship built in 1886 at Fairfield Shipbuilding and Engineering, Govan, Scotland for the British Government's Nile Expedition.

== See also ==
- More Ships Built at Govan
