= Norman Shanks =

Norman Shanks (born 15 July 1942) is an ordained Church of Scotland minister, who prior to his retirement in June 2007 was minister of Govan Old Parish Church, Glasgow. He is married to Ruth, and has a daughter and two sons, and seven grandchildren.

He was Convener of the Church of Scotland's Committee on Church and Nation from 1988 to 1992, a member of the BBC Broadcasting Council for Scotland from 1988 to 1993 and the UK Board of Christian Aid from 2000 to 2004. Educated at Stirling High School and the Universities of St Andrews (MA, 1964) and Edinburgh (BD, 1982), before entering the ministry he served as a senior civil servant from 1964 to 1979, including a term (1975–77) as Private Secretary to the Secretary of State for Scotland.

He was Chaplain to the University of Edinburgh from 1985 to 1988, Lecturer in Practical Theology at the University of Glasgow from 1988 to 1995 and Leader of the Iona Community from 1995 to 2002 and served as Moderator of the Presbytery of Glasgow from June 2002 to June 2003. From 1998 to 2006 he was a member of the Central Committee of the World Council of Churches and served as moderator of the planning committee for the 9th Assembly of the WCC, held in Porto Alegre, Brazil in February 2006. From August 2010 to July 2016 he was a non-executive member of the Greater Glasgow and Clyde Health Board.

He received an honorary DD from the University of Glasgow in June 2005 and was one of three candidates for nomination to be Moderator of the General Assembly of the Church of Scotland in 2007. In 1999 he was Drummond Lecturer at Stirling University and from September to December 2007 was a visiting scholar at Columbia Theological Seminary, Decatur, Georgia, USA. A revised edition of his book Iona – God's energy: the vision and spirituality of the Iona Community, originally published by Hodder and Stoughton in 1999, was published in 2009 by Wild Goose Publications.
