= Constantine of Strathclyde =

Son and successor of King Riderch Hael of Alt Clut

Saint Constantine of Strathclyde
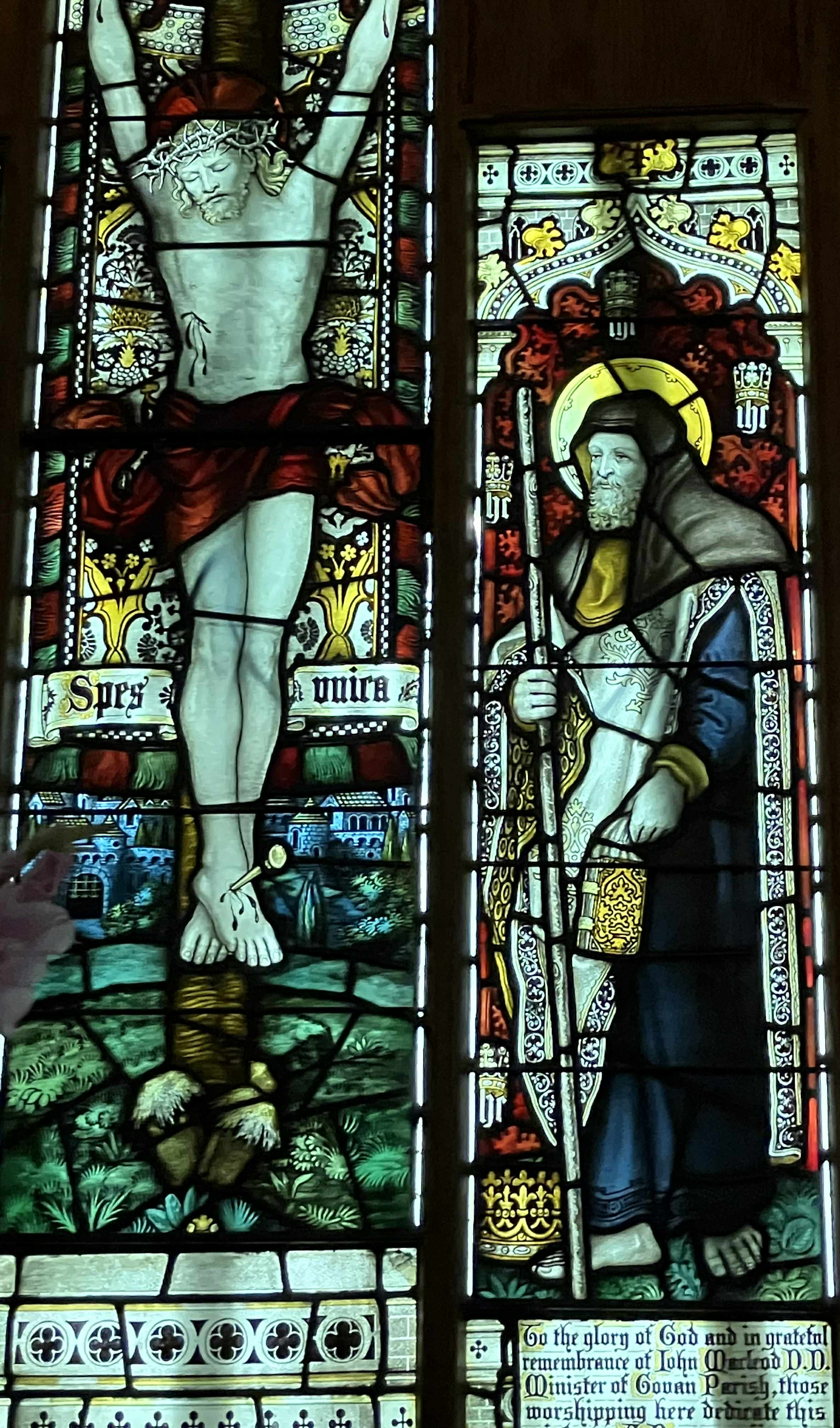
- Constantine (right of the crucified Christ)

King of Strathclyde
- Born: c. 570 AD
- Died: 636 AD; Govan, Glasgow
- Venerated in: Eastern Orthodox Church; Roman Catholic Church
- Major shrine: Govan Old Parish Church
- Feast: 11 March

Constantine was reputedly the son and successor of King Riderch Hael of Alt Clut, the Brittonic kingdom later known as Strathclyde. (The modern English name of Alt Clut is Dumbarton Rock.) He appears only in the Life of St. Kentigern by Jocelyn of Furness, which regards him as a cleric, thus connecting him with the several obscure saints named Constantine venerated throughout Britain.

According to Jocelyn, Constantine was the son of Riderch and his queen Languoreth. He succeeded his illustrious father upon his death, but later stepped down to become a clergyman. However, no other sources mention a son of Riderch named Constantine. He is absent from the pedigrees of Northern British kings in the Harleian genealogies and the Bonedd Gwŷr y Gogledd (This is the Descent of the Men of the North). A Saint Constantine was venerated in the area around Glasgow, the setting of much of Jocelyn's narrative; the early church in the nearby burgh of Govan was dedicated to him. However, by the 12th century Saint Constantine's biography was obscure, so it is likely that King Constantine was a literary invention created to provide a narrative for the shadowy early figure.

The compilation of hagiographies in the Orthodox Church known as the "Great Synaxaristes" includes Saint Constantine of Strathclyde, giving his feast day as 11 March. It also states that he was guided to Christianity by Saint Columba, became a missionary of the faith in England and Ireland, and died around 640.

St Constantine of Strathclyde and Govan is a saint recognised by the Greek Orthodox Church. Whilst there are no robust historical records of his existence, the available legend narrates that he abdicated the throne of Strathclyde in 612 AD to become a monk, and later a priest. It is also said that he was Christianised by St Columba. Notwithstanding the lack of reliable information, the date 612 AD would be in a time range that would be contemporary with the date of Christian occupation of the Govan church yard, where archaeological investigation has confirmed Christian use from the 5th and 6th centuries. However, the sarcophagus commonly believed to have housed his relics occupies a stylistic date range of the 9th to 10th centuries. This does not exclude the possibility that the sarcophagus was created at a later date to house the remains or part of the remains of the earlier saint, as such a practice was common during the Medieval age of relic cults across Christendom. There are three later Scottish kings known by the name Constantin(e), who all reigned several centuries after the legendary figure associated with Riderch Hael of Alt Clut.

Matters become further confused as there is a Cornish St Constantin(e) associated with the Dark Age kingdom of Dumnonia, which itself is very similar in culture and origin to the British Kingdom which centred on Strathclyde, then known as Damnonii/Damnonia. With the current lack of original sources there is a divided scholarly opinion as to whether Constantine of the British Kingdoms was the same figure, or examples where one figure was fabricated in emulation of the other, or whether there was indeed several who were named at birth popularly as Constantin(e). Further scholarship and archaeological investigation would be required to establish further conclusions.
