= Govan Old Parish Church =

- The Parish Church of St Constantine of Strathclyde
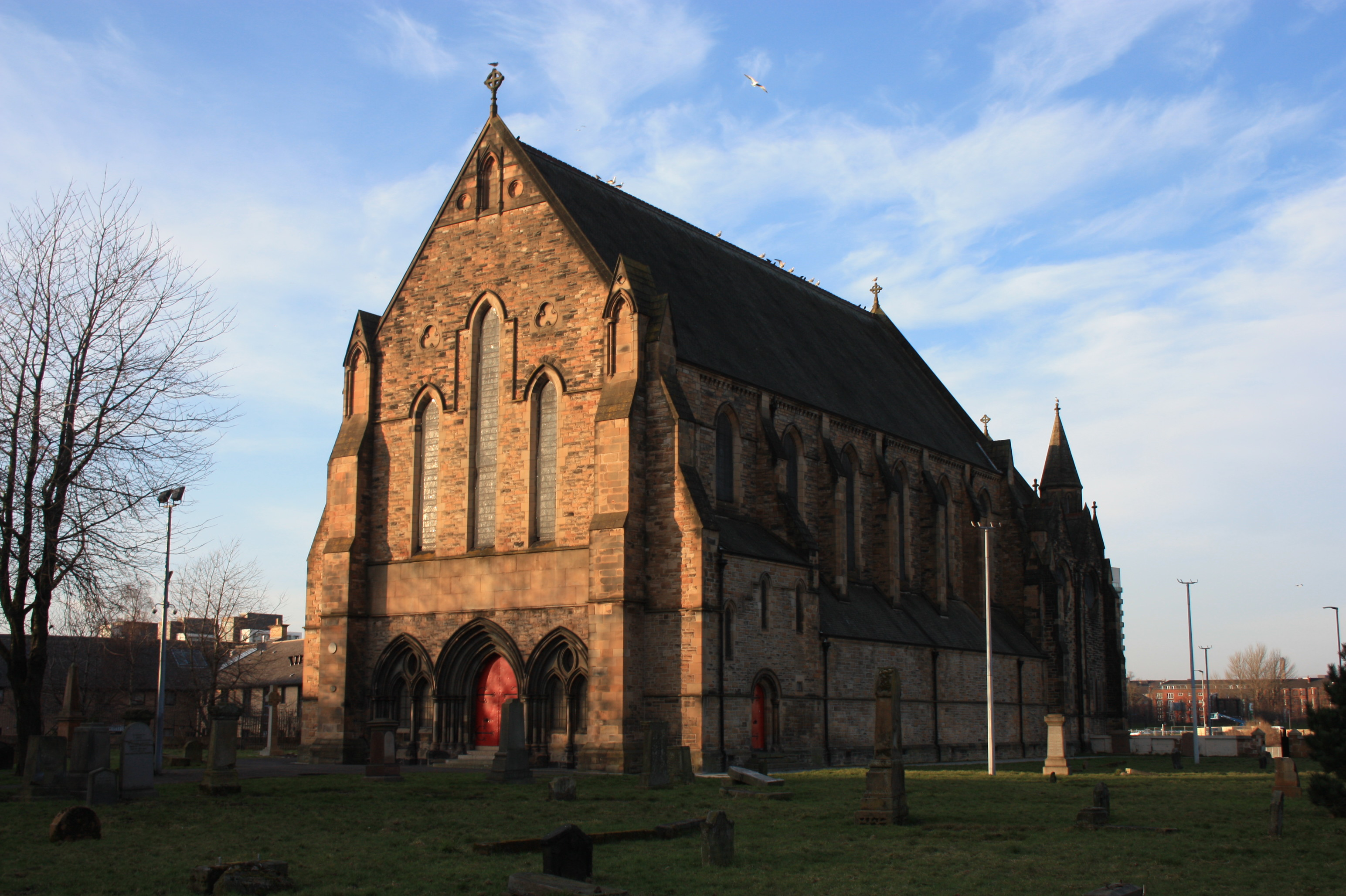
- Govan Old Parish Church
- 55°51′53″N 4°18′46″W
- Location: Glasgow
- Country: Scotland
- Denomination: Church of Scotland
- Website: https://thegovanstones.org.uk/

History
- Status: Closed
- Founded: c.5th to 6th Century
- Dedication: Constantine of Strathclyde
- Dedicated: 19 May 1888

Architecture
- Functional status: Museum & Historic Church
- Architect: Robert Rowand Anderson
- Years built: 1884-1888
- Groundbreaking: 6 December 1884
- Closed: October 2007

Administration
- Parish: Govan & Linthouse

Listed Building – Category A
- Designated: 6 July 1966
- Reference no.: LB33353

Govan Old Parish Church is a former parish church serving Govan in Glasgow from the 5th or 6th century AD until 2007. In that year, the Church of Scotland united the two Govan congregations with Linthouse and established the parish church at Govan Cross, making Govan Old redundant. A decade later, Govan Old Walkway was opened, connecting both with a new riverside path.

Govan Old is no longer used for regular Sunday services, but the building remains a place of worship with a daily morning service and is open to visitors in the afternoons. The church, dedicated to a Saint Constantine, occupies a Scottish Gothic Revival building of national significance (A-Listed by Historic Environment Scotland) within a churchyard designated a Scheduled Ancient Monument (Historic Environment Scotland).

The church houses an internationally significant collection of early medieval sculpture, known as the Govan Stones. All the carved stones come from the churchyard and include the Govan Sarcophagus, four upstanding crosses with figurative and interlace decoration, five Anglo-Scandinavian hogbacks, and a wide range of recumbent burial monuments, all seemingly dating to the 9th–11th centuries AD.

== Early-medieval churchyard ==
It is believed that the site's earliest Christian activity began sometime in the 5th or 6th century AD. Archaeological excavations in the 1990s uncovered two early Christian burials beneath the foundations of a later church; these burials were radiocarbon-dated between the 5th and 6th centuries AD (AD 435-601 and AD 474-601).

Despite this early activity, it wasn't until the 9th and 10th centuries that Govan Old rose to prominence: indeed, there are few historical references to Govan in the interim, though there appears to be one reference included in Symeon of Durham's Historia Regum, compiled sometime in the 12th century AD. In it, Simeon records the return of the Northumbrian army from 'Ovania' after attacking Dumbarton Rock (Alt Clut) in AD 756.

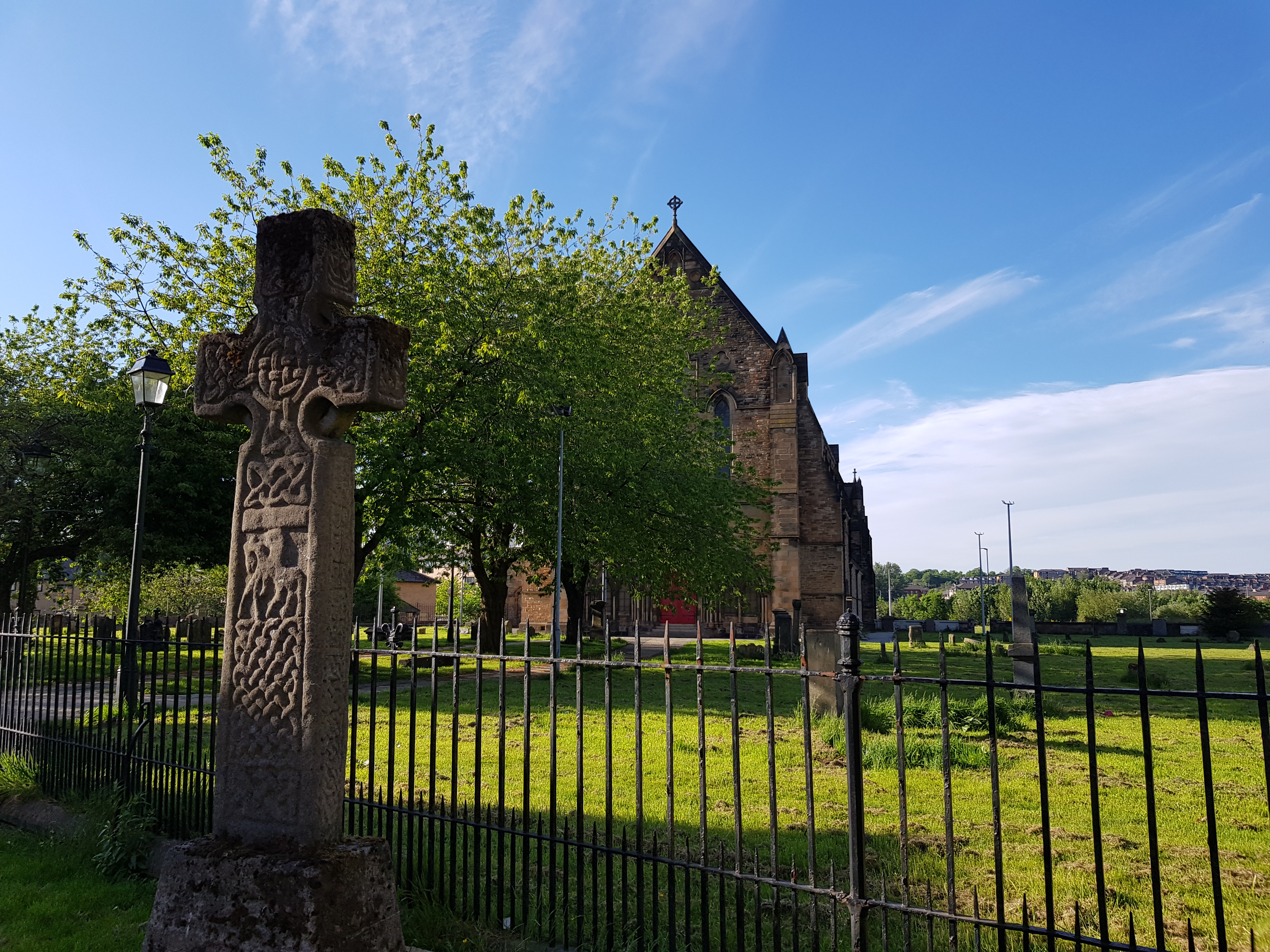

Originally, the Annals of Ulster recorded Dumbarton Rock as the centre of the Brittonic Kingdom of Alt Clud (usually pre-emptively referred to as the Kingdom of Strathclyde, but which is more accurately described as ‘the kingdom of the Rock of the Clyde’) from the 6th century AD until the later 9th century AD. In AD 870, the annals record a Viking raid on Dumbarton Rock; after this point, the kings of Clyde Rock are no longer discussed. In 872, the Annals of Ulster instead refer to the kingdom of Ystrad Clud, better known as the Kingdom of Strathclyde, which appears to mark the shift of political power from Dumbarton Rock further upstream to Govan.

It is possible that a predecessor of the 12th-century royal estate at Partick and the now-destroyed Doomster Hill (which is thought to have functioned as a Viking-style 'thing' site or moot/meeting place, having been adapted from a possible Bronze-Age burial mound) played a part in this power shift.

The size of the graveyard and the sheer amount of early medieval sculpture suggest that the church was supported by royal patronage. Because the site has been in continual use since it was first established, it is impossible to tell what the original church looked like, but it is clear that it always had Christian associations.

== Church building ==
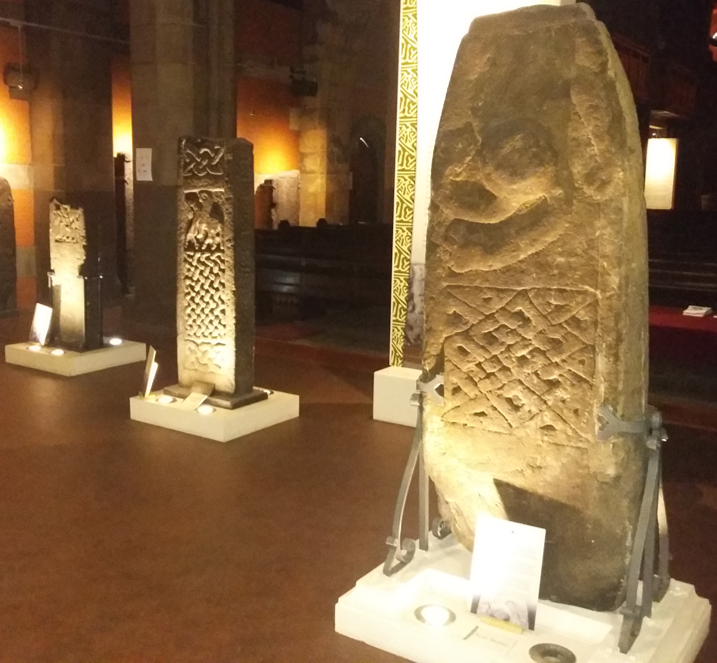
Early medieval upright crosses at Govan Old

Excavations have revealed that there has been a succession of churches built on the site of the present church building. Little is known of the early churches however it is documented that the medieval church building had a belfry at the west end and was expanded with the addition of a north aisle in 1651. Its foundations were uncovered during excavations that took place between 1994 and 1996. The medieval church was demolished in 1762 when a new church was built. This 18th century church was replaced with a new church built in 1826 in the Georgian Gothic Style. This building was dismantled in 1884 and rebuilt in Golspie Street as the Elder Park Parish Church. Elder Park Parish Church closed in 1970 and the building was demolished in 2008 after it burned down.

The present Govan Old Parish Church is an ornate, Category A listed building of significant architectural merit, designed by Robert Rowand Anderson and influenced by features at Pluscarden Abbey near Elgin.

The majority of the current church building was constructed 1884–1888, although the site is one of the oldest places of Christian worship in Scotland. It was opened and dedicated on 19 May 1888. Unusually, the axis of the church was turned to orientate north–south rather than the traditional east–west orientation, but this allowed the main door to face south to the main street.

Upon construction, the congregation was closely associated with the Scoto-Catholic High Church movement within the Church of Scotland—several former ministers have been actively involved with the Scottish Church Society. Notable former ministers include the Reverend George MacLeod, later the Lord MacLeod of Fuinary, and Norman Shanks, Leader of the Iona Community from 1995 to 2002.

Govan Old also has noteworthy stained glass windows. Two of the church's windows were given by Robert Malcolm Kerr; the Emmaus window in 1891, and Christ blessing the children in 1902. Both were made by Heaton, Butler and Bayne.

The church's museum collection of early medieval Christian carvings, known as the Govan Stones, is of international significance. This was first properly recognised in December 1855 when the digging of a grave led to the rediscovery of a sarcophagus. The discovery prompted scholars to illustrate and record the Govan Sarcophagus and other early medieval monuments in the churchyard. A photographic record of forty-six carved stones was commissioned and published by John Stirling Maxwell. For this publication, Robert Foster of Stirling made plaster casts of each of the stones; these casts were then taken to the studio of renowned photographers T & R Annan & Son and photographed in ideal lighting conditions to emphasise the carving. These photographs were used in the J. Romilly Allen and Joseph Anderson's Early Christian Monuments of Scotland, though only thirty-nine were included in their volume; however, of these thirty-nine, one stone was not recorded by Stirling Maxwell, which puts the number of probable early medieval stones from Govan at forty-seven.

In the 1960s, Ralegh Radford saw the stones as a means to understand Govan's early significance and made close comparisons between the carved stones from Govan and those found at Inchinnan, which, along with other monuments in the region, are described as belonging to a ‘Govan School’ of carving.

Today, thirty monuments are currently on display inside the church, and a single recumbent monument of medieval date remains in the graveyard. Sixteen of the stones that were not brought into the church were thought to have been buried or removed after the demolition of the Harland & Wolff factory building in 1973, but a recent community archaeology dig identified the location of at least three of the lost stones.

Of the thirty-one monuments on display at Govan Old, there is one sarcophagus, two cross-shafts, two upright cross-slabs, five hogbacks, and twenty-one recumbent cross-slabs.

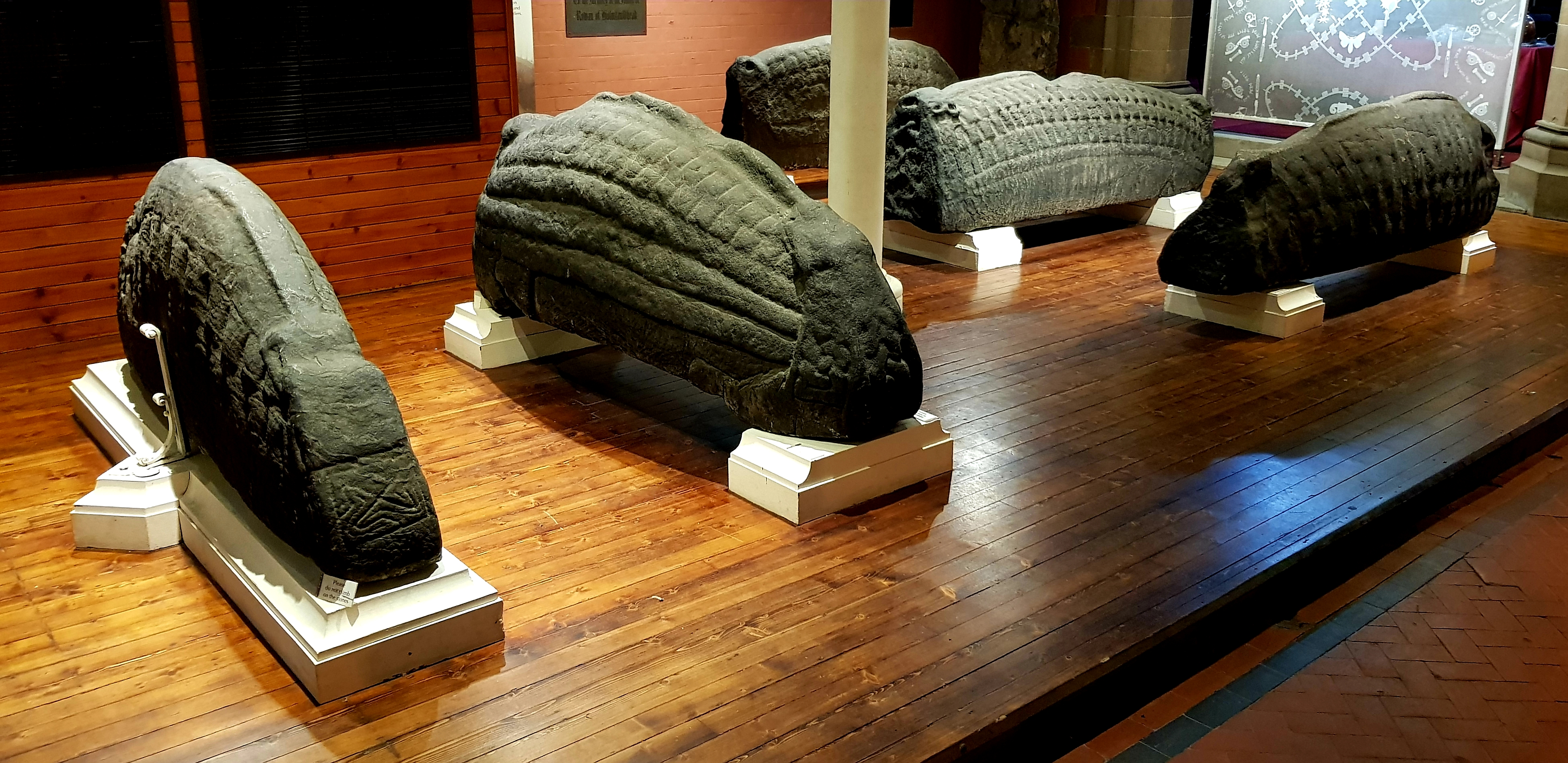
The Govan hogbacks

Govan Old and the Govan Stones museum are open daily between April 1 and October 31 from 1pm-4pm (visitors can contact the museum to arrange tours in the off season). Admission to the museum is free, although there is the option for visitors to make donations, and a small gift shop inside including books and local handicrafts which raises money for the upkeep of the property and its collections.

== Amalgamation ==
Following arbitration, the Church of Scotland's Presbytery of Glasgow decided upon a union of the three local Church of Scotland congregations in the Govan area. Govan Old (along with the charges of Linthouse St Kenneth and New Govan) was terminated on 28 October 2007, becoming part of Govan and Linthouse parish and congregation.

After 2007, the future of the Govan Old Parish Church was uncertain. In 2008, an options appraisal study was undertaken by Govan Workspace Ltd, which applied for funding to redisplay the sculpture. The funding was secured in 2011, allowing the redisplay to be completed by Northlight Heritage/York Archaeological Trust in 2013. Govan Old's future was secured when the Govan Heritage Trust obtained a grant from the Scottish Government in 2016. The trust aims to develop the church into a self-sustaining community-run cultural, museum and business complex, but requires further financial support to bring it to fruition.

The former minister of the Govan and Linthouse Parish Church was the Rev Moyna McGlynn, who died in August 2016.

The church is located near Govan Station on the Glasgow Subway. Its main entrance is next to the Govan War Memorial, which is to the immediate west of the Pearce Institute on Govan Road.

== Archaeology ==
The Channel 4 archeology programme Time Team dug in the graveyard of the Govan Old Parish Church in the fourth episode of series 4, recorded in mid-1996 and broadcast in early 1997.

In March 2019, Stones and Bones community archaeologists with a schoolboy named Mark McGettigan revealed long-lost medieval stone carvings. The stones were assumed to have been demolished by chance when the neighbouring Harland & Wolff shipyard plater shed was demolished in the 1970s.

"This the most exciting discovery we have had at Govan in the last 20 years. The Govan Stones are a collection of international importance and these recovered stones reinforce the case for regarding Govan as a major early medieval centre of power", said Stephen Driscoll.

== Restoration ==
In April 2026, a restoration project began to transform the site into a museum and visitor attraction displaying the Govan Stones.

== Notable ministers ==
- Andrew Melville (1577–1580)
- Thomas Smeaton (1580–1584)
- Patrick Sharp (theologian) (1585–1614)
- Robert Boyd (university principal) (1615–1621)
- Hugh Binning (1650–1653)
- Matthew Leishman (1794–1874), father of Thomas Leishman. Matthew was Moderator of the General Assembly of the Church of Scotland in 1858, was minister of the parish 1821 to 1874.
- George MacLeod (1930–1938), who left Govan in 1938 to found the Iona Community
- David Orr (1960–1980), whose efforts led to the establishment of the Govan Housing Association.
- Tom Davidson Kelly (1989–2002) established the Friends of Govan Old and brought attention to the early medieval sculpture at Govan by persuading scholars to consider the collection at a conference in 1992.
- Moyna McGlynn (2008–2016) maintained the building after its closure and supported the old congregation, allowing time for a community-based trust to assume responsibility for the site.

== See also ==
- List of Church of Scotland parishes
