= Presbytery of Glasgow =

The Presbytery of Glasgow is one of the 14 Presbyteries of the Church of Scotland. It dates back to the earliest periods of Presbyterian church government in the Church of Scotland in the late 16th century. The Presbytery of Glasgow currently has 110 congregations, making it one of the largest Presbyteries in the Church of Scotland (only eclipsed by the Presbytery of the South West). Until the mergers of Presbyteries in the early 2020's, Glasgow had been the largest.

Congregations vary in location from suburbs and urban priority areas (representing part of the poorest 5% of Scotland’s population) to outlying towns and villages. The Presbytery boundaries extend beyond the City of Glasgow to include parts of four other local authority areas (East Dunbartonshire, East Renfrewshire, North Lanarkshire and South Lanarkshire).

== Presbyterianism ==
As a Presbyterian church, the Church of Scotland has no bishops. Instead courts of ministers, elders and deacons have collective responsibility for the governance of the church. The Presbytery is the intermediate court of the church, subject to the General Assembly and responsible for the oversight of Kirk Sessions (at a congregational level.) As with all courts of the Church, the Presbytery is chaired by an annually elected Moderator.

== Moderator of the Presbytery ==
Each year Presbytery nominates a Moderator to serve for one year. The Moderator begins their term in June, and represents the Presbytery at church, ecumenical, inter-denominational and civic events, among others. In 2003-2004, the Rev. Adah Younger (minister at Dennistoun Central Parish Church) became the first woman to be Moderator of the Presbytery.

== Presbytery meetings ==
The Presbytery meets each month (except January, July and August). Twice a year, smaller regional meetings are held covering a number of topics. All meeting dates, times and venues are advertised on the Presbytery website (https://www.presbyteryofglasgow.org.uk/).

== Presbytery structure ==
The Presbytery is based around a committee structure made up of: Business, Community Responsibility; Ecumenical Relations & Interfaith Matters; Education; Learning & Nurture; Ministries; Mission Plan Implementation; Mission Plan Review, Mission, Pioneering and Planting, Nominations; Property; Staffing; Stewardship & Finance; Superintendence (including Safeguarding); World Mission; and Worship.

== Presbytery Clerk ==
The Presbytery Clerk is Rev. S Grant Barclay, formerly minister of Kilmarnock St Kentigern's and Glasgow: Orchardhill. Previous Presbytery Clerks include Rev. George S. Cowie, formerly parish Minister at South Holburn in Aberdeen Presbytery , who also served as a Chaplain in Ordinary to His Majesty the King; Very Rev. Bill Hewitt (Moderator of the General Assembly of the Church of Scotland 2009-2010), Rev. Dr Graham Blount, Rev. Dr Angus Kerr, and Very Rev. Dr David Lunan, (Moderator of the General Assembly of the Church of Scotland 2008-2009).

The Presbytery Office is located in Glasgow city centre within the Renfield Centre, attached to St Andrew’s West Church, at 260 Bath Street, Glasgow G2 4JP.

== See also ==
- Govan Old Parish Church - no longer used for regular worship
- List of Church of Scotland parishes
- Norman Shanks - a former Presbytery Moderator
- Presbytery of Aberdeen (Church of Scotland)
- Presbytery of Europe (Church of Scotland)

=== Other denominations ===
- Diocese of Glasgow and Galloway (Scottish Episcopal Church)
- Roman Catholic Archdiocese of Glasgow
