= Västergötland Runic Inscription 81 =

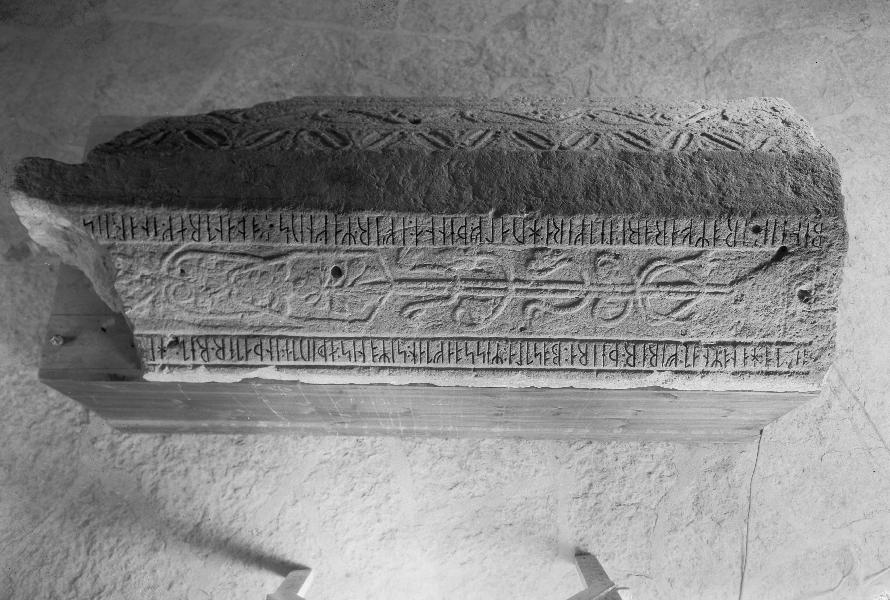
Vg 81

The Västergötland Runic Inscription 81 is a 12th-century runestone engraved in Old Norse with the Younger Futhark runic alphabet. It is in the form of a grave slab and it was found in the old cemetery of Broddetorp in Falköping Municipality, but it is presently located in the Västergötland Museum in Skara.

== Inscription ==
ben(d)ikt · romfarari : let (g)era : hualf : þenna : ifir · ma(g)nus · (k)oþan dræ(g) · ------s... ¶ ok : d(o) : (h)(a)n om nat : firir · þeira : postla : messo(a)ftan : simonis : æð iute : in þat er · ret · hu... ...
Bendikt {} Romfarari {} let gæra {} hvalf {} þenna {} yfiʀ {} Magnus, {} goðan dræng {} ... {} Ok {} do {} hann um natt {} fyriʀ {} þæiʀa {} postla {} messuaftan {} Simonis {} et Juda. {} En þat eʀ {} rett {} hv[ærium] ...
"Bendikt Rome-traveller had this vault made over Magnus, a good valiant man ... And he died in the night before the eve of the mass of the apostles Simonis et Juda. And that is right for everyone ... "
