= Govan =

Area of Glasgow, Scotland

Coordinates: 55.8615°N 4.3083°W

Govan: Scottish Gaelic: Baile a' Ghobhainn
- District, parish and former burgh
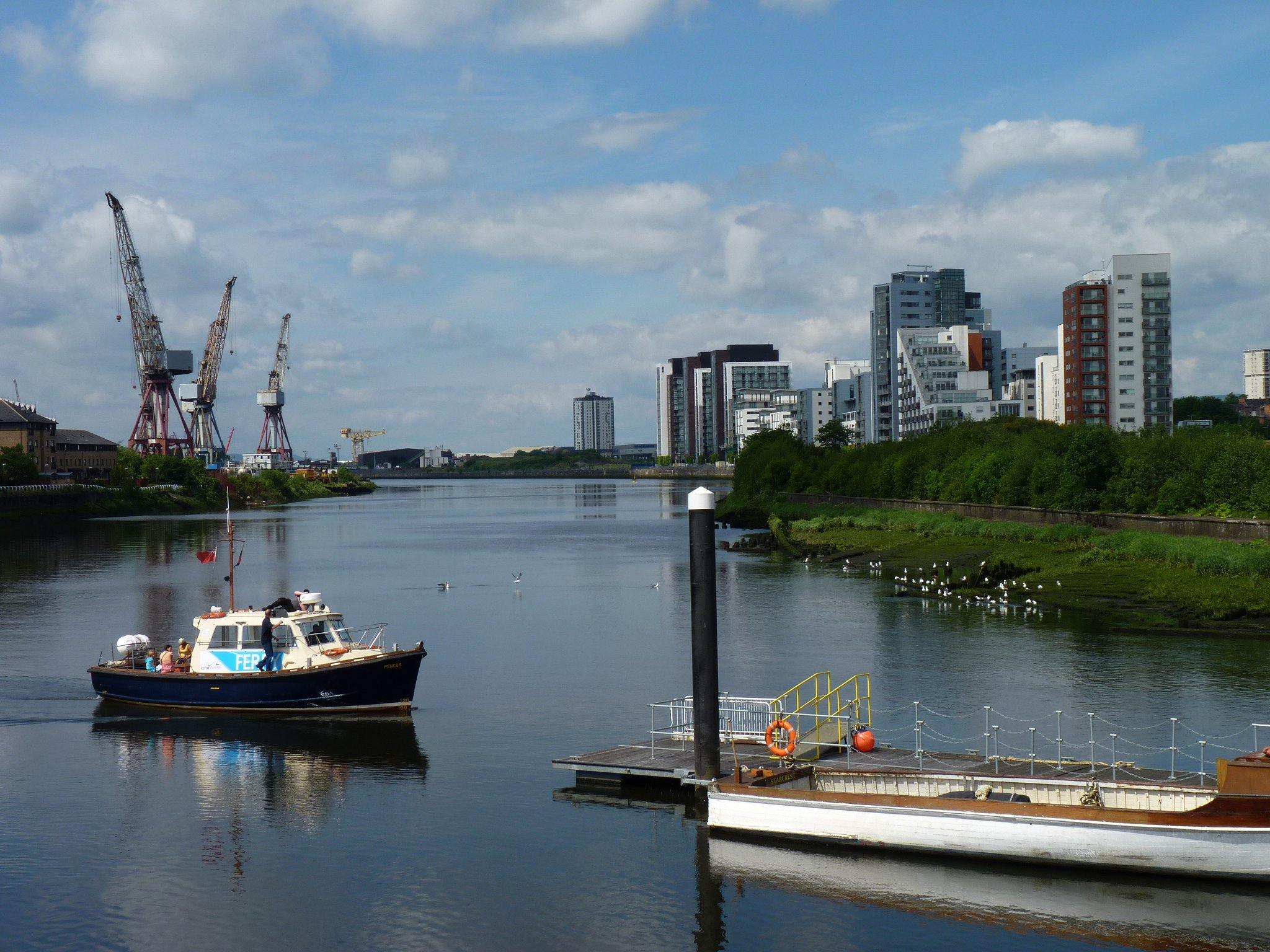
- The local Govan Ferry on the River Clyde, with new harbour development

- Location within the Glasgow City council area Location within Scotland
- Area: 1.63 km^{2} (0.63 sq mi)
- Population: 5,860 (2015)
  - Density: 3,595/km^{2} (9,310/sq mi)
- OS grid reference: NS555655
  - Edinburgh: 45 mi (72 km) E
  - London: 346 mi (557 km) SSE
- Council area: Glasgow City
- Lieutenancy area: Glasgow
- Country: Scotland
- Sovereign state: United Kingdom
- Post town: GLASGOW
- Postcode district: G51
- Dialling code: 0141
- Police: Scotland
- Fire: Scottish
- Ambulance: Scottish
- UK Parliament: Glasgow South West
- Scottish Parliament: Glasgow Pollok Glasgow Southside

Govan (/ˈɡʌvən/ GUV-ən; Scottish Gaelic: Baile a' Ghobhainn) is a district, parish, and former burgh now part of southwest Glasgow, Scotland. It is situated 2 1/2 miles (4 kilometres) west of Glasgow city centre, on the south bank of the River Clyde, opposite the mouth of the River Kelvin and the district of Partick. Historically it was part of the County of Lanark.

In the early medieval period, the site of the present Govan Old churchyard was established as a Christian centre for the Brittonic Kingdom of Alt Clut (Dumbarton Rock) and its successor realm, the Kingdom of Strathclyde. This latter kingdom, established in the aftermath of the Viking siege and capture of Alt Clut by Vikings from Dublin in 870, created the stone sculptures known today as the Govan Stones.

Govan was the site of a ford and later a ferry which linked the area with Partick for seasonal cattle drovers. In the eighteenth and nineteenth centuries, textile mills and coal mining were important; in the early-nineteenth century, shipbuilding emerged as Govan's principal industry. In 1864, Govan gained burgh status, and was the fifth-largest burgh in Scotland. It was incorporated into the City of Glasgow in 1912.

== History ==
=== Early history ===
Recent studies of the archaeology of Govan Old have revealed the presence of an ancient Christian church. Two associated Christian burials are radiocarbon dated to the 5th or 6th centuries, making Govan the earliest known Christian site in the region. Govan is believed to have then been part of a kingdom ruled from Dumbarton Rock, known as Alt Clut, the rock on the Clyde. During the Viking Age, following the sack of Dumbarton Rock in 870, Govan is believed to have been one of the major centres of the Kingdom of Strathclyde. In 1855, an elaborately carved sandstone sarcophagus was found during digging in the churchyard. It is now kept inside the church, as part of the Govan Stones museum collection. It may have been used to contain the body or relics of St. Constantine, a Pictish king seemingly killed by Vikings in 877 – the style of carving indicates an origin in the late 9th or early 10th century.

Govan's earliest recorded name may be found in the Historia regum Anglorum attributed to Symeon of Durham. This is a 12th-century Latin source, but one believed to be based on much earlier materials; it records a place near Dumbarton Rock named Ouania. Based on this, Govan's Cumbric language name has been reconstructed as *(G)uovan. Govan is Baile a' Ghobhainn (the smith's town) in Scottish Gaelic. Bishop Leslie in his Scotia Descriptio of 1578 says it got its name from the excellence of its ale (God-win), whereas Chalmers in his Caledonia says it is derived from Scottish Gaelic, Gamhan (a ditch).

The earliest references to Govan are found in connection with the Christian church. In 1136, when Glasgow Cathedral was formally consecrated, King David I (1124–53) gave to the See the lands of Partick and also of the church at Govan (on opposite sides of the River Clyde), which became a prebend of Glasgow. Govan Old Parish Church was rebuilt in 1762, 1826, and again 1884–1888. Within it and its roughly circular churchyard is one of the finest collections of Early Christian stones in Britain, known as the Govan Stones, dating from the c.9th to 11th centuries.

Not much is known about any medieval village that may have surrounded the church until 1454 when it is recorded that whole houses, barns and mills in the village were brought down by a great flood.In 1756 the Govan Weavers Society was formed to assist members and their families and this organisation continues as a charity in Govan holding annual events and supporting local causes. See www.govanweavers.com .

By the 16th century, extensive coal mine workings had been developed around Craigton and Drumoyne.

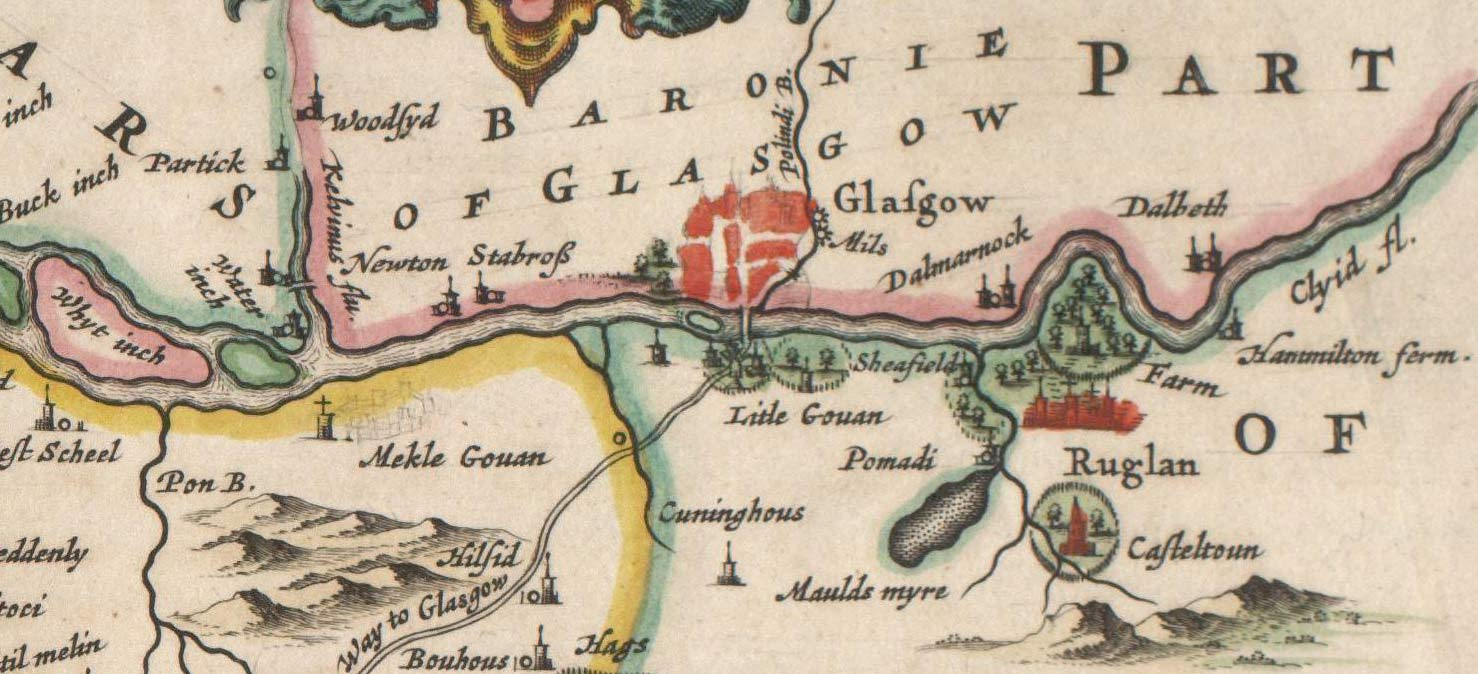
A part of Blaeu's 1654 map of Scotland. Modern Govan is at the site labeled Mekle Gouan ("Big Govan"). The small town of Glasgow is on the north bank of the Clyde, across from Litle Gouan ("Little Govan") In 1756 the Govan Weavers Society was formed to provide benevolent assistance to distressed members and their families and widows and the Society continues as a charity to this day holding several events in Govan annually.

There is an oddity whereby part of eighteenth-century parish of Govan (which was in Lanarkshire) is counted as being within Renfrewshire. There existed a hospital in the area, and as quasi-religious foundations were not taxed, it had never been assigned to a sheriffdom. Thus, when Renfrewshire was created out of a sheriffdom of Lanarkshire in the early fifteenth century, the lands associated with the hospital (Polmadie) were not technically in the newly created shire, as they were not part of the sheriffdom. They were, however, very much a part of the physical landscape that became Renfrewshire. A similar uncertainty existed regarding the nearby lands of Pollokshields and Westends. People lived with the inconsistency in the records. When the railway was to be built in the late nineteenth century, however, the confusion over proper descriptions in the land titles made necessary legal transactions difficult and had to be reconciled. The county added to the description of these lands, the phrase: "but now by annexation in the County of Renfrew."

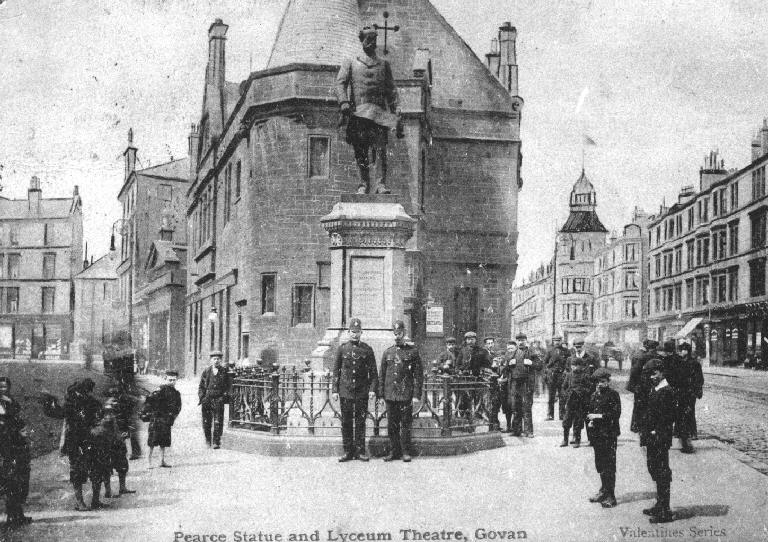
Pearce Statue and Lyceum Theatre, 1904.

By the early part of the 19th century, Govan was rapidly losing its rural appearance and assuming the character of a town with the development of new industries and factories, including Reid's Dye Works and Pollok's Silk Mill. Town officials arranged for the deepening of the Clyde in 1759, the reclamation of the channels between the islands (The Whyte Inch, The Black Inch, and The King's Inch), and the construction of quays and docks. This facilitated the development of shipbuilding as a major industry. By the 1860s, the village needed a higher order of administration and it was made a burgh in 1864, under the General Police and Improvement (Scotland) Act 1862. At the time, it was the fifth largest burgh in Scotland and contained within its boundaries the areas of Plantation, Cessnock, Ibrox, Craigton, and Drumoyne. in 1901 the Burgh boundaries increased further west to include Linthouse and West Drumoyne.

With Morris Pollok as its first Provost, the Burgh and its Commissioners ensured that during the next 48 years Govan became a well-equipped, modern town. During the late 19th century, the population of Govan increased more than tenfold: from 9,000 in 1864 to 95,000 by 1907. In 1901 Govan was the 7th largest town in Scotland. In 1912, Glasgow annexed Govan after a series of annexation battles.

A prominent feature of the Govan landscape was the Doomster or Moot Hill, which stood near the river, north of the present Govan Cross. It was removed in the early 19th century and Reid's Dyeworks was erected on the site. The origins of the Doomster Hill are a mystery. One hypothesis is that it was a prehistoric burial mound. In 1996, a team from Channel 4's Time Team programme carried out an archeological excavation at the site. They suggested that the hill may have been a 12th-century Norman motte.

=== 20th century to the present ===
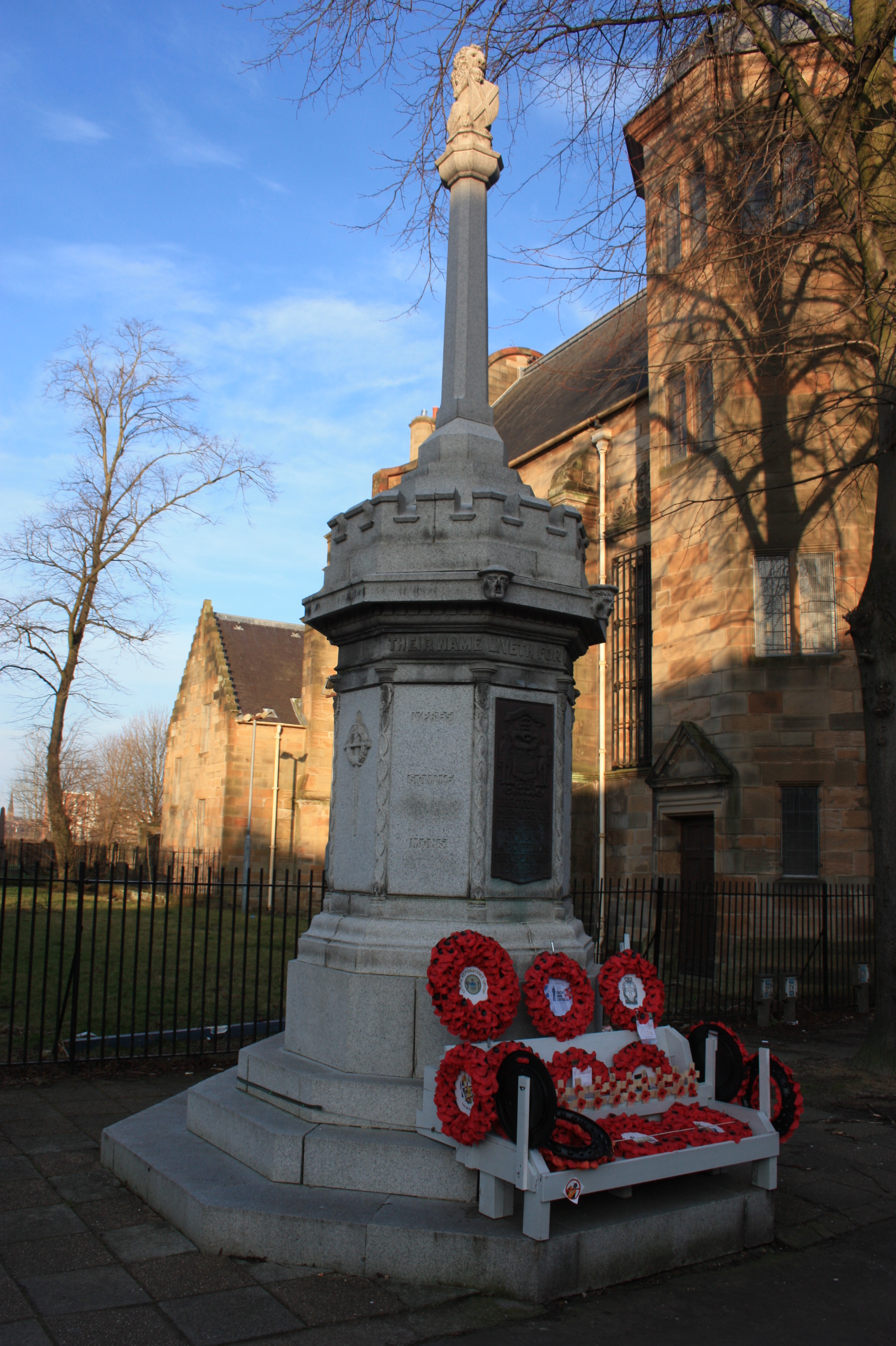
Govan War Memorial

Traditionally viewed as a lower working-class area, Govan has typically supported the Labour Party, but the Scottish National Party (SNP) has also been strong there. In 1973, the SNP won a by-election with Margo MacDonald as their candidate. The SNP won another by-election victory in 1988, this time with Jim Sillars as candidate. The latest victory for the SNP was in the 2007 Scottish parliamentary elections, when Nicola Sturgeon became the MSP for the constituency.

The area has had a reputation for deprivation and poverty, partly due to the construction of housing estates in the 1930s to relieve the overcrowded slum district of The Gorbals. The most famous of these housing estates is Moorepark, sometimes referred to jocularly as "The Wine Alley" – this area was named by The Independent newspaper in April 1994 as one of the worst areas in Britain, with drug abuse being a widespread problem and unemployment standing at nearly 30% (up to three times the national average at the time).

It was parodied by the BBC sitcom Rab C. Nesbitt. Although Govan was the stated setting for the show, episodes were seldom filmed there.

Despite these developments, there were numerous older buildings around Govan until quite recently, most notably the terraces and tenements situated around Govan Road. These were not cleared until well into the 1970s. However, there is the potential for tourism development, for example, the planned development of the Govan Old site, which hosts the historically significant stone carvings, has led to the development of the surrounding townscape and new infrastructure. Such developments benefit the aesthetic and connective appeal of the Govan area for future visitors.

== Economy ==
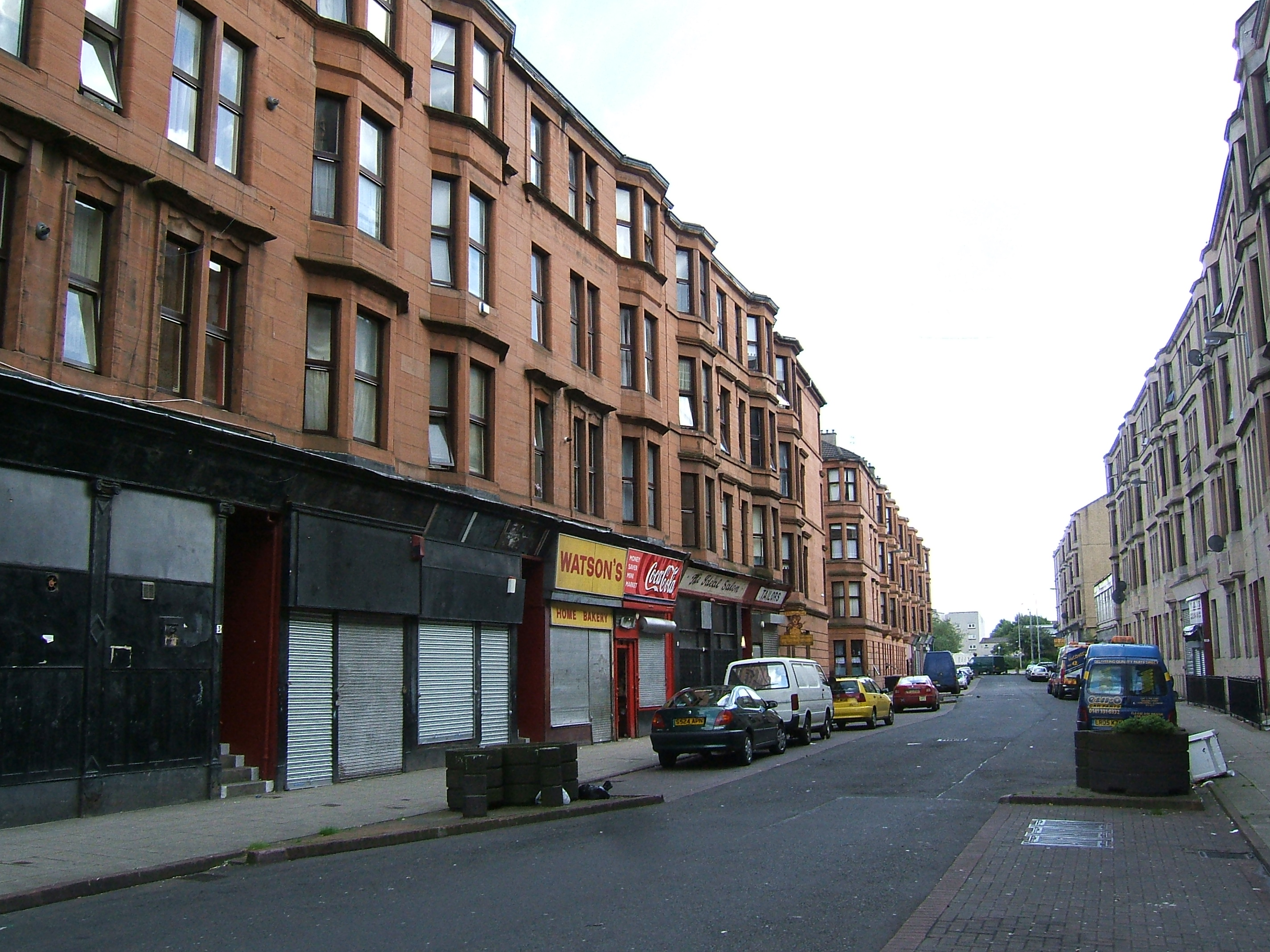
Govan street scene

Govan was at one point the centre of the world-renowned Clydeside shipbuilding industry. In 1841, Robert Napier began iron shipbuilding in Govan, and in 1843 produced its first ship, Vanguard. He also procured a contract with the Royal Navy to produce vessels, notably Jackal, Lizard, and Bloodhound. He also allowed naval officers in training to visit the shipyard to familiarise themselves with the new vessels. Napier's Shipyard in Govan was later acquired by William Beardmore and Company in 1876 and incorporated into William Beardmore and Company in around 1900.

Govan's other major shipbuilding firm, Randolph, Elder and Company who had taken a lease of Robert Napier's Old Yard at Water Row in 1860, launched their first ship at the yard in 1861, however in 1863 the company acquired land at nearby Fairfield estate to lay out a new larger shipyard. After John Elder's death in 1869 the company was renamed John Elder and Company. In 1885, under William Pearce, the company was reorganised as the Fairfield Shipbuilding and Engineering Company Ltd. This company continued until 1965, when it filed for bankruptcy. The following year in 1966, the yard was again reorganised as Fairfields and guaranteed by the government in response. The following year, Fairfields and the other major Clydeside yards (Stephens, Connels, Yarrows and John Browns) were merged to form Upper Clyde Shipbuilders (UCS).

In 1971, Upper Clyde Shipbuilders went into receivership and the Conservative government led by Edward Heath refused to give them a £6,000,000 loan. Rather than go on strike, which was the traditional form of industrial action, the union leadership of the yards decided to have a work-in and complete the orders that the shipyards had in place. In this way they dispelled the idea of the workers being "work-shy" and also wanted to illustrate the long-term viability of the yards. Fairfield Shipbuilding and Engineering Company was renamed Govan Shipbuilders in 1973.

In 1977, the Labour government of James Callaghan passed the Aircraft and Shipbuilding Industries Act 1977 (c. 3) which nationalised Govan and grouped it with other major British shipyards as British Shipbuilders. In May 1979, Margaret Thatcher was elected Prime Minister and her ministry soon began its privatisation programme. British Aerospace, established by the same act, was privatised in 1981. British Shipbuilders road to privatisation was not as swift, and the group was sold piece by piece throughout the course of the 1980s.

Kværner of Norway, as part of a planned development of a large international shipbuilding group, took over Govan. British Shipbuilders' sale of Govan to the Norwegian firm was completed in 1988, and the yard was renamed Kvaerner Govan.

In 1999, GEC's Marconi Marine division purchased the yard when Kværner announced its departure from the shipbuilding industry. GEC's Marconi Marine division already owned YSL (purchased in 1985) and VSEL (purchased in 1995). Marconi Electronic Systems and its Marconi Marine unit were sold to British Aerospace in 1999 to form BAE Systems. The shipbuilding operations became BAE Systems Marine, which subsequently became part of BVT Surface Fleet, a naval shipbuilding joint venture between BAE Systems and VT Group, which became BAE Systems Surface Ships in 2009.

Alexander Stephen and Sons also established a shipyard in nearby Linthouse in 1870. The yard eventually closed in the wake of the collapse of the Upper Clyde Shipbuilders consortium in 1971.

=== Ships built at Govan ===
- PS Vanguard (1843)
- PS Scotia (1861)
- HMS Northampton (1876)
- HMS Nelson (1876)
- HMS Curacoa (1878)
- SS Arizona (1879)
- Ibis (1886)
- Akasha (1886)
- Livadia (1880)
- Victoria (1886)
- RMS Campania (1891)
- RMS Lucania (1893)
- HMS Venus (1895)
- HMS Diana (1895)
- HMS Highflyer (1898)
- HMS Hermes (1898)
- HMS Cressy (1899)
- HMS Aboukir (1900)
- HMS Good Hope (1901)
- HMS Bedford (1901)
- SS Armadale Castle (1903)
- RMS Port Kingston (1904) renamed RMS Tahiti
- HMS Cochrane (1905)
- HMS Commonwealth (1905)
- RMS Empress of Britain (1906)
- RMS Empress of Ireland (1906)
- SS Volturno (1906)
- HMS Indomitable (1907)
- SS Balmoral Castle (1910)
- HMS New Zealand (1911)
- HMAS Sydney (1912)
- RMS Empress of Russia (1913)
- RMS Empress of Asia (1913)
- SS Calgarian (1913)
- HMS Valiant (1914)
- HMS Renown (1916)
- RMS Empress of Canada (1922)
- SS Athenia (1922)
- Aorangi (1922)
- TSS Tuscania (1923)
- SS Letitia (1924)
- MV Speybank (1926)
- HMS Berwick (1926)
- HMS Norfolk (1928)
- RMS Empress of Japan (1930)
- HMS Delight (1932)
- HMS Woolwich (1934)
- HMS Liverpool (1937)
- HMS Phoebe (1937)
- HMS Howe (1940)
- HMS Bellona (1942)
- HMS Implacable (1942)
- HMS Theseus (1944)
- HMS Chichester
- HMS Blake (1945)
- SS Karanja (1948)
- TS Oxfordshire (1955)
- TS/SS Empress of Britain (1956)
- TS Leecliffe Hall (1961)
- HMS Fife (1964)
- HMS Antrim (1967)
- USNS Harkness (1968)
- Jervis Bay (1969)
- Pacifique (1969)
- USNS Chauvenet (1970)
- Pacific Peace (1981)
- MV Selkirk Settler (1983)
- MV Saskatchewan Pioneer (1983)
- St. Lawrence Seaway (1983)
- Sir Charles Parsons (1985)
- MV Norsea (1986)
- MV Havis (1992)
- Sea Launch Commander (1996)
- RFA Wave Ruler (2003)
- RFA Mounts Bay (2004)
- HMS Daring (2006)
- HMS Dauntless (2007)
- HMS Diamond (2007)
- HMS Dragon (2008)
- HMS Defender (2009).
- HMS Duncan (2010)

A list of almost 3000 ships built at Govan has been collected in the "Clydebuilt Database". Ships built by the following companies: Robert Napier & Company, Randolph Elder & Company, Dobbie Hedderwick & Co., Dobie & Company, Mackie & Thomson, Smith & Rodgers, London & Glasgow Engineering and Iron Shipbuilding Co. Ltd., William Beardmore & Company, John Elder & Company, Fairfield Shipbuilding & Eng. Co. Ltd., Alexander Stephens & Sons, J & G Thomson, Harland & Wolff and more.

== Transport ==
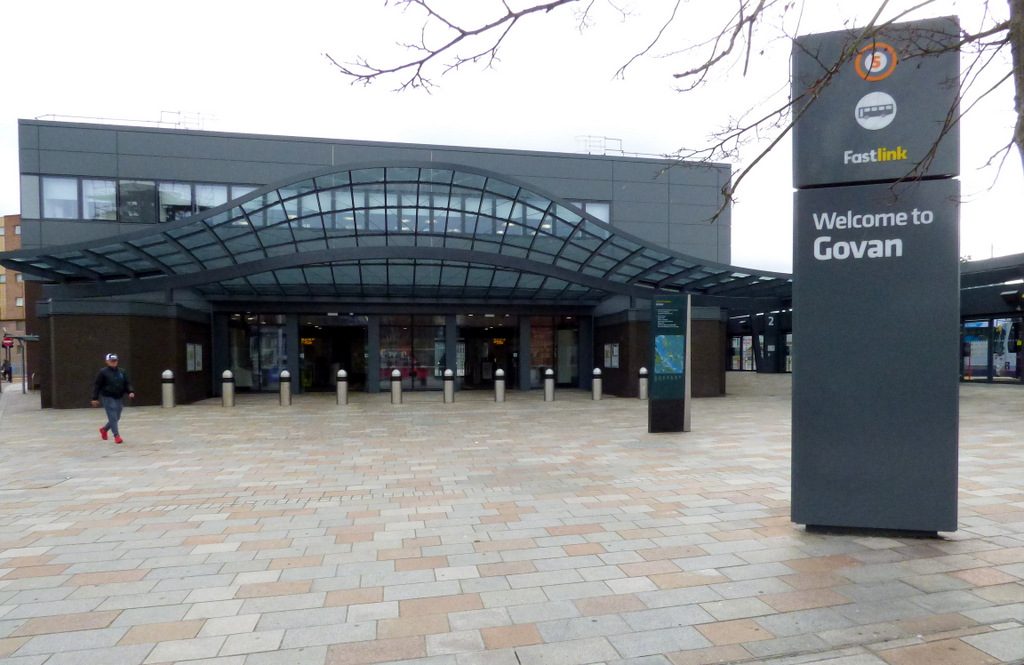
Govan Interchange

Govan is served by Govan Subway Station, Ibrox Subway Station and Cessnock Subway Station on the Glasgow subway system.

Govan railway station opened on 2 December 1868. It closed permanently to regular passenger services on 9 May 1921.

Regular bus services, mainly operated by McGill's Bus Services and First Glasgow, offer frequent routes to Glasgow City Centre, as well as to numerous locations in Renfrewshire.

== Sports ==
Govan borders the district of Ibrox, home to the Scottish football club Rangers F.C. who traditionally incorporate the red and black civic colours in the socks of their kit; their Ibrox Stadium has a stand named for Govan (the closest to the heart of the burgh), although officially this was re-named after their former player Sandy Jardine in 2014.

Govan is home to the Scottish Junior football team Benburb F.C. who until March 2014 played at Tinto Park (Drumoyne) then moved to the adjacent New Tinto Park. They share a rivalry with St Anthony's F.C. who originated from the Helen Street area of Govan, but are now based further west at Shieldhall. Linthouse and Parkgrove were 19th century senior sides, who fell into decline and are now defunct.

There were two other sporting venues for local residents and workers located in the south of Govan (with no space available in the industrial northern area at the Clyde): White City Stadium and Albion Greyhound Stadium, both now entirely demolished.

== Media ==
Govan is served by community radio station Sunny Govan, broadcasting on 103.5FM to the city of Glasgow and surrounding districts, discussing local issues and providing advice, and with diverse musical output covering soul, hip-hop and reggae.

Govan has had several local newspapers over the years such as the Govan Chronicle and Govan Press published by the Cossar Family (1851–1983) and by John Maclean (2006–2014) which also served the communities of Kinning Park, Cardonald, Penilee and Hillington, and the Govan Post (1983–1988) published by Cook, Paton & Co. of Paisley, now part of Dunfermline Press.

== Religion ==
=== Church of Scotland ===
The church of Govan was a prebend of Glasgow. It was dedicated to St Constantine, who had been buried at Govan. On 13 July 1577, the teinds of Govan were granted to the University of Glasgow, and the Principal of the University ex officio was appointed minister of the parish. This settlement was set aside on 20 December 1621, and only the patronage of Govan was left to the University. There was a chapel in the parish at Partick. Govan Church was rebuilt in 1762, and again in 1826. A later rebuilding was begun in 1884 and was opened 19 May 1888.

== List of Provosts of Govan ==
- 1864–1867 Morris Pollok
- 1867–1869 William Cruickshank
- 1869–1872 Thomas Reid
- 1872–1880 James Wilson
- 1880–1883 John Thompson
- 1883–1886 Alexander Campbell
- 1886–1889 George Ferguson
- 1889–1892 Neil McLean
- 1892–1901 James Kirkwood
- 1901–1904 John Marr
- 1904–1908 Sir John Anthony
- 1908–1912 David McKechnie

== Popular culture ==
- Scottish TV sitcom Rab C Nesbitt is set in Govan; although the series is mostly filmed elsewhere.
- Channel 4's Time Team filmed a Series 4 episode in Govan, where they excavated the Churchyard at Govan Old, home of the Govan Stones, and a local carpark to the immediate east of Water Row.

== Notable people ==
- Mary Barbour, resident in Govan while helping to organise the Glasgow Rent Strikes
- Isabella Elder, philanthropist who gifted Elder Park and Elder Park Library to the people of Govan, as well as many other projects.
- Hugh Binning child genius, professor of philosophy and minister of Govan
- Leo Blair (senior), father of former Prime Minister Tony Blair and high court judge Sir William Blair, raised on Golspie Street
- Ivor Cutler avant garde performer
- Sir Alex Ferguson, football manager and player widely known for managing Manchester United from 1986 to 2013 (won more trophies than any other manager, considered one of the greatest of all time)
- James Hedderwick, poet and newspaper proprietor, born and raised in Govan.
- Jimmy Speirs, footballer (scored the winning goal in the 1911 FA Cup Final, received the Military Medal during the First World War)
- James Kelman, writer
- George MacLeod, minister of the Church of Scotland's Govan Old Parish Church (founded the Iona Community, whose offices are still based in Govan)
- David Meiklejohn, Rangers and Scotland footballer
- Andrew Melville minister of Govan, reformer and scholar at Glasgow and St Andrews (exiled)
- Belle Moore, Olympic Gold Medalist
- Thomas Ashburton Picken, lithographer
- Johnny Quigley, footballer
- Jimmy Reid, trade unionist
- Iain Robertson, actor
- Chick Young, football pundit
- Johnny Beattie, actor and stand-up comedian
- Bill Martin, songwriter, music publisher and impresario
- Lady Elish Angiolini KC, Lord Advocate of Scotland and former Solicitor General for Scotland, brought up in Govan
- Peter Barr, nurseryman and merchant better known as "The Daffodil King"
- Jim Craig, Celtic player and Lisbon Lion
- George Rossi, Scottish actor

== See also ==
- Glasgow Govan (UK Parliament constituency)
