= Tony Coxon =

Sociologist (b. 1938, d. 2012)

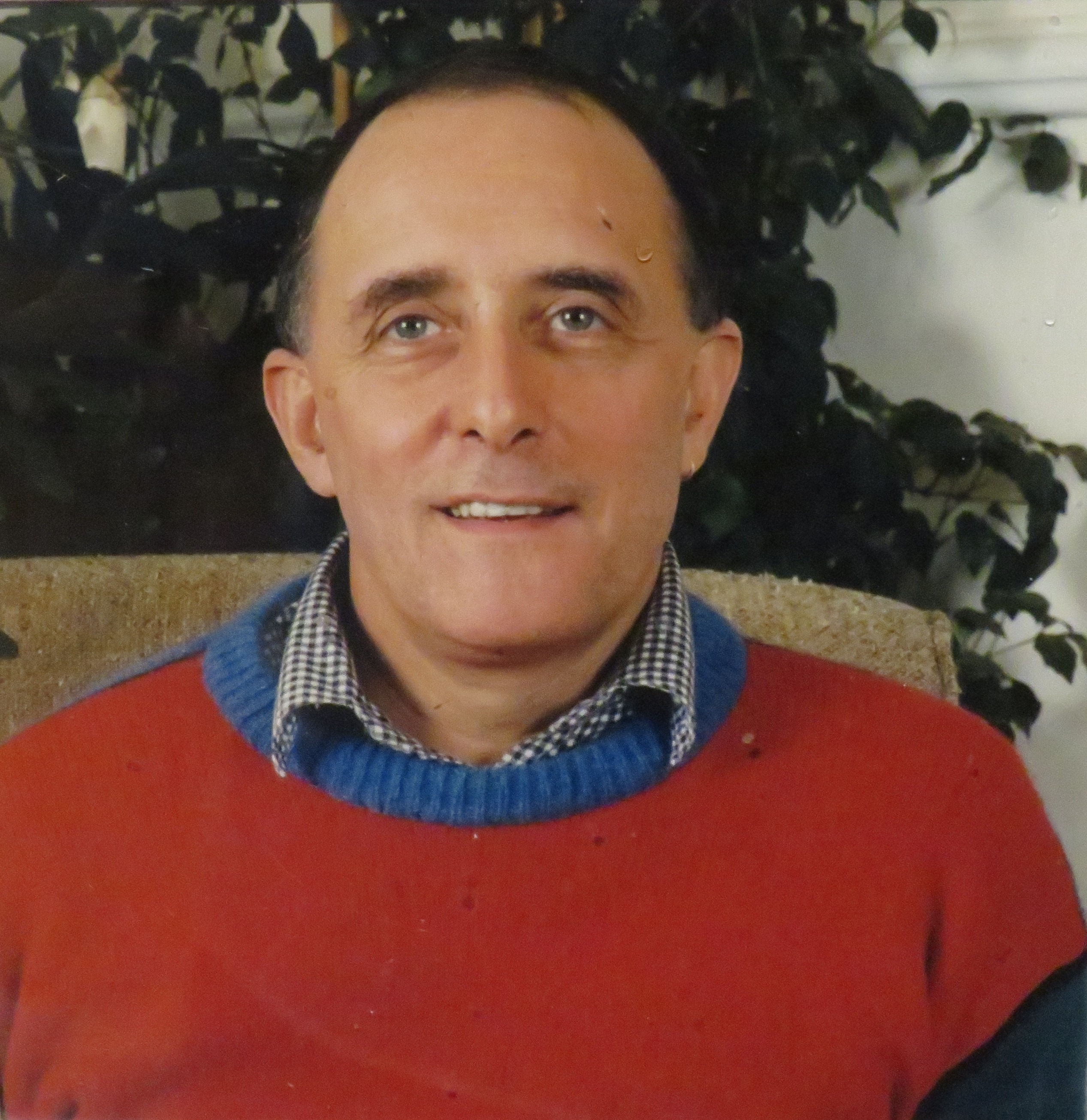
Professor Anthony 'Tony' Peter Macmillan Coxon (1938-2012), Sociologist

Anthony Peter Macmillan Coxon (1938–2012), better known as Tony Coxon, was a sociologist and pioneer of multidimensional scaling. His fields of research included religion, occupations, social networks and male sexuality. Appointed professor at the age of 35, Coxon later became first director of the ESRC Research Centre and subsequently worked at the Institute for Social and Economic Research of the University of Essex, where he managed the British Household Panel Survey.

== Family ==
Tony was born on 7 March 1938 at Thornleigh Nursing Home, Sale, Cheshire, in what is now Greater Manchester, the son of Agnes Muriel, née M[a]cMillan, and Leslie Wilson Coxon, A.C.W.A.He had two siblings, an elder sister, Máire, and a brother, Tim.Tony Coxon's maternal grandfather Robert McMillan was from Carsphairn in Kirkcudbrightshire, where his great grandfather, George Campbell McMillan (an elder brother of [John] Campbell McMillan, father of Tony's first cousin twice removed, the renowned aviator Norman Macmillan), and his 2x great-grandfather Robert McMillan, had worked as joiners. The latter's wife, Agnes Campbell, Tony's 2x great-grandmother, was a sister of Rev James Campbell of Traquair in Peeblesshire, who in turn was the father of Rev George Campbell, minister of Eastwood in Renfrewshire, whose son, the Very Rev James Montgomery Campbell, was a moderator of the General Assembly of the Church of Scotland.

== Childhood ==
A cabinet maker like his brother George, who remained in Carsphairn, Robert McMillan, Tony’s grandfather, left the village with a friend, and found work in Dumfries at the Crichton Royal Mental Hospital, but the job was only short-term, and he moved on to bustling Manchester. He married a Yorkshire lass called Rose Leadbeater, and the couple brought up three children, Jean, Muriel and Bob. When World War 2 broke out, Muriel, Máire and Tony’s mother, was evacuated together with the children to stay with aunts and other relatives at the family’s ancestral village of Carsphairn, where the threat of enemy bombing raids was not as acute as in Manchester.

Máire: "Not long after Tony had begun to walk, when he pulled a hot pot of tea over his foot. The doctor was called (from another village I think) and he bandaged the foot and gave orders that the dressing had to be changed daily. I don’t know if that was the practice then, but today the skin would be given time to heal before removing the dressing. His walking was delayed for several months and he bears the scar on his foot to this day!"

== Education ==
Tony was educated at The King's School, Canterbury, after which, from 1952-1956, he attended Cheadle Hulme School. While still at school, Tony acted in theatre plays such as Christopher Fry's The Lady's not for Burning, where he appeared as the chaplain.Following school, in view of his pacifist leanings, Tony worked as a nursing assistant in place of National Service before joining the Mirfield monastic community with a view to becoming an ordained Anglican priest, but shortly after beginning his studies in Philosophy and Sociology at Leeds University in 1958, he had a temporary lapse of faith which led to him abandoning his plan to enter the ministry. After Leeds, Tony continued his studies in Edinburgh. Tony's brother-in-law, via his elder sister Máire, was the Scottish Gaelic and Esperanto scholar Garbhan MacAoidh (Girvan Christie McKay, 1929-2024), a Church of Scotland minister. All three were members of the Manchester Branch of An Comunn Gaidhealach Gaelic Society, whose Gaelic Study Circle Girvan McKay taught Scottish Gaelic in. In 1966, Tony married Morfydd "Monnie" Williams, a teacher from South Wales, with whom he had three children, but after coming out as gay in 1977, the couple eventually separated, remaining on friendly terms until Monnie's death in 1995 at the age of fifty.

== Career and research ==
Coxon lectured at the Universities of Leeds, Edinburgh and Cardiff where he specialised in research methods, and subsequently in sexualities and health studies. Thanks to a research scholarship and visits to Harvard and MIT, Coxon became familiar with pre-Internet computing and Artificial Intelligence at an early stage. During his time in the USA, he became strongly influenced by the political climate of the 1960s:

"This brings us to 1968: Europe and the US were experiencing the student revolt and through my involvement with Peace Research (the committed version of Conflict Research), I was invited to Harvard and MIT as a visiting professor. What a year! – both institutions "blew up"; teach-ins addressed by people like Noam Chomsky on the Vietnam war; introduction to newly developing disciplines like Artificial Intelligence; the experience of interactive computing and of the beginnings of what now is the WWW (then ARPAnet); I was convinced."

Tony had already fathered a daughter, but with a son on the way, there were new potential issues to confront. With the Vietnam War in full swing, the Coxons had to set priorities: Tony was happy living in Massachusetts, but was concerned that if his son was born on American soil, he would run the risk of later conscription and involvement in a war, so the couple returned to Leeds in 1969 for the birth of the baby. On an interim visit to her parents in Wales along with her daughter, Monnie expressed the opinion that America "is not the sort of place one would like to live in permanently, but it’s nice for a visit." After Leeds, Coxon took up a post at Edinburgh University, which was known for its social sciences and early AI technology, and stayed there for six years. An added bonus was that the institution possessed a rare IBM computer which was compatible with US software.

At 37, Coxon was offered a chair of Sociological Research Methods at Cardiff University, where he soon became Department head. In 1989 he took up the post of Director of the new Interdisciplinary Research Centre of the University of Essex, as the ESRC was then called.From Occupational Cognition, he moved on to Multidimensional Scaling and Content Analysis. Between 1997 and 2002, he was Professor of Sociology and Health Studies.

== Sundry activities ==
In the 1980s, during the AIDS crisis, Professor Coxon took charge of a major research study conducted by the Social Research Unit at University College, Cardiff, looking into AIDS and the changing lifestyle of homosexuals.Coxon was co-director of the Institute for Behavioural Research on AIDS, University of Wales College of Medicine, Cardiff, and professor in the Bro Tâf Health Authority. He was a member of the health education subcommittee of the DHSS expert advisory group on health education and AIDS and a member of the Welsh Office Health Education advisory committee, subcommittee on AIDS. He was co-founder with Dr Tom McManus and Dr Peter Davies of the panel study funded by the MRC and DHSS, Project SIGMA (Sociosexual Investigations of Gay Men and Aids) and was principal investigator at the South Wales and Essex sites (1982–2002); consultant and adviser of WHO Special (later, Global) Programme on AIDS (1987–92) and coordinator of the seven nation International Studies of Gay and Bisexual Behaviour and Aids and a member and Chair of the ESRC Steering Group on AIDS. He was also consultant to Barnet, Brent and Harrow, Bro Tâf, South-East London and North Essex Health Authorities’ HIV/AIDS research advisory and Education Units on PSE (Public Sex Environment) and Outreach Project (1996–2002).

== Political life ==
Coxon was a member of the Committee of 100, and of the National Administrative Council of the Independent Labour Party.

== Death ==
Tony Coxon died of a brain tumour on 7 February 2012 at Marie Curie Hospice, Penarth, Wales.
