= Carsphairn =

Village in Dumfries and Galloway, Scotland

Coordinates: 55.21019°N 4.26463°W

Carsphairn: Scottish Gaelic: Cars Feàrna
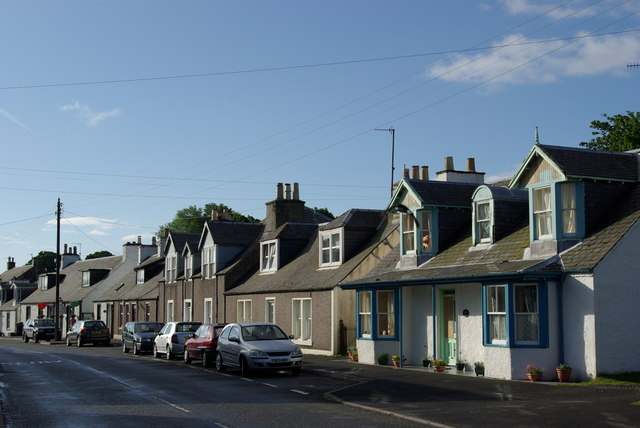
- Carsphairn

- Location within Dumfries and Galloway
- OS grid reference: NX561933
- Council area: Dumfries and Galloway
- Lieutenancy area: Kirkcudbrightshire
- Country: Scotland
- Sovereign state: United Kingdom
- Post town: CASTLE DOUGLAS
- Postcode district: DG7
- Police: Scotland
- Fire: Scottish
- Ambulance: Scottish
- UK Parliament: Dumfries and Galloway
- Scottish Parliament: Galloway and West Dumfries

Carsphairn (Scottish Gaelic: Cars Feàrna) is a village in the historic county of Kirkcudbrightshire in Dumfries and Galloway, Scotland. It is located about halfway between Dalmellington and St John's Town of Dalry, on the A713 road. Carsphairn annual sheep show is held in the village. Cairnsmore of Carsphairn is to the north east of the village in the Carsphairn and Scaur Hills. To the west is the ridge of the Rhinns of Kells in the Galloway Hills.

The village has many features ranging from an ancient stone circle to a nuclear listening post (now disused), and includes local amenities such as a shop, tearoom, a primary school and a village hall.

Carsphairn Church, Church of Scotland was built in 1815 on site of an earlier church. Additions and alterations in the 1930s include the apse and porch.

The Knockengorroch World Ceilidh takes place here annually.

== History ==
Carsphairn was made an independent parish around 1627, prior to which it had been a part of the Parish of Dalry, and was created a Free Burgh in 1672 under a charter requested by Robert Grierson of Lag.

== People with Carsphairn roots and notable residents ==
- Rev James Campbell, Carsphairn-born Church of Scotland parish minister of Traquair, who, whilst serving as a tutor to the Hart family of Castlemilk, wrote numerous early 19th century letters describing his travels from France to Spain to Italy to Paris and on to Holland, with details of their flight from France to Spain during the return to power of Napoleon in France; now archived and transcribed by the Carsphairn Heritage Archive.
- Rev George Campbell, parish minister of Eastwood, author, and founder of the Church Service Society, a forerunner of the Scottish Church Society; son of James Campbell and father of Very Rev James Montgomery Campbell
- Very Rev James Montgomery Campbell, a Moderator of the General Assembly of the Church of Scotland
- Prof Thomas Jackson FRSE (1773–1837) physicist was born and raised here.
- John Loudon Macadam (1756–1836). Lagwyne just outside the village was his childhood home.
- Colonel Alexander Clark-Kennedy of Knockgray (1780–1864) captured the eagle and colours of a French regiment at the Battle of Waterloo.
- Wing Commander Norman Macmillan, the renowned aviator and author, was the son of Campbell Macmillan (McMillan), a Carsphairn-born toolmaker in Glasgow, and the grandson of Robert McMillan, a carpenter, and his wife Agnes, sister of Rev James Campbell
- John Semple (c1602-c1677) First Presbyterian minister and Scots Worthy

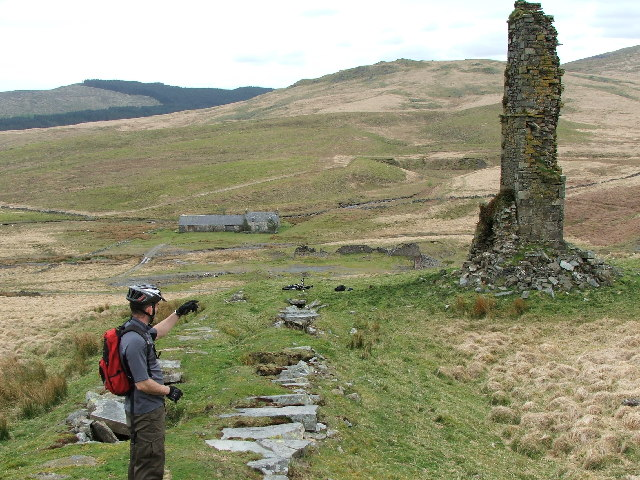
Disused lead mines, Woodhead, Carsphairn

== Industry ==
Industry is mainly rural, but, historically, a significant mining industry existed, particularly of lead, following the discovery of significant quantities in 1837. By the mid-1850s the mine was producing 1,000 tons annually. Mining continued in the area, with peak production between 1906 and 1914. Following the end of the First World War, the industry collapsed and by 1928 all lead mining operations had ceased.

== List of listed buildings ==
List of listed buildings in Carsphairn, Dumfries and Galloway
