= George Campbell (19th-century minister) =

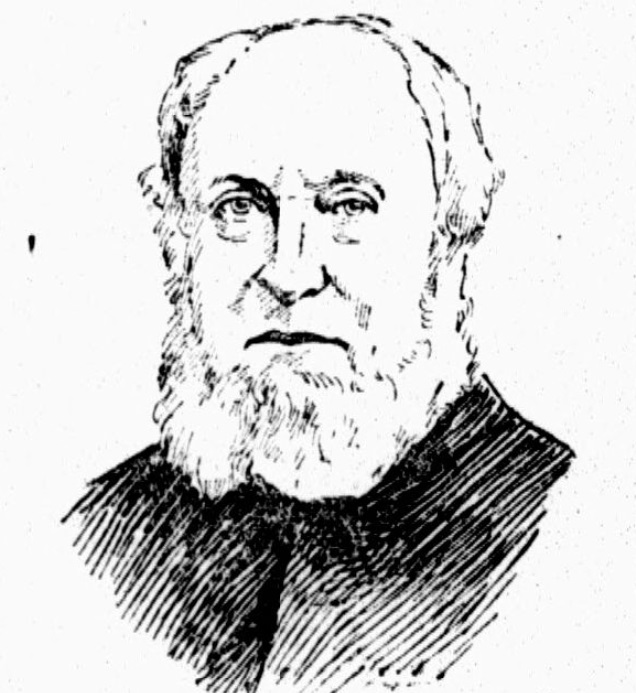

Scottish clergyman and author

Personal details
- Born: 9 September 1827 Traquair, Peeblesshire
- Died: 30 April 1904 (aged 76) Eastwood, Renfrewshire
- Spouse: Euphemia Harriet Drummond Graham
- Children: 12, including Very Rev James Montgomery Campbell
- Parents: James Campbell (father); Mary Combe (mother)
- Education: Edinburgh

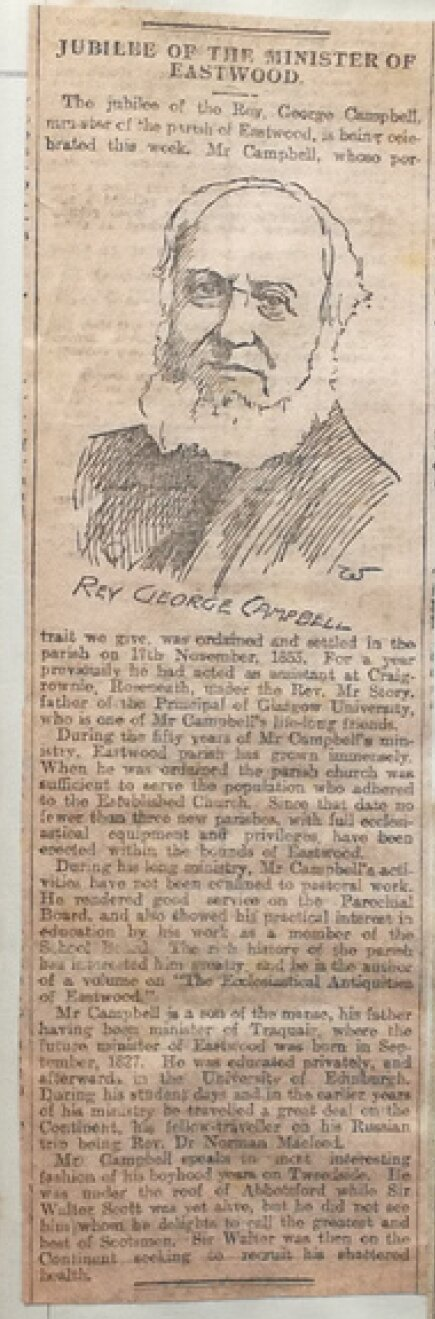
Rev George Campbell Jubilee (unknown newspaper)

Rev George Campbell (1827–1904), born in Traquair, Peeblesshire to Rev James Campbell and Mary, née Combe, was a long-serving Glasgow Church of Scotland clergyman, co-founder of the Church Service Society and author of the Glasgow parish history Eastwood: Notes on the Ecclesiastical Antiquities of the Parish.

== Ministry ==
Campbell was the parish minister of Eastwood on the outskirts of Glasgow between 1853 and 1904. He was privately educated, after which he attended Edinburgh University. During his youth on Tweedside, he was at Abbotsford whilst Sir Walter Scott was still alive, although the two never met since Scott was on the Continent at the time. Like his father, Campbell travelled extensively as a student on the Continent and during the early years of his ministry. This included a trip in 1860 to Tsarist Russia along with the Rev Dr Norman Macleod, a later Moderator of the General Assembly.

=== Rosneath ===
After a "distinguished career" at the University of Edinburgh, Campbell went to Rosneath as an assistant clergyman to Rev Robert Story, the father of Very Rev Robert Herbert Story, the Principal of Glasgow University, and in that parish was the driving force behind the erection of a chapel at Craigrownie which later functioned as a parish church. Campbell served as minister of the latter for little more than a year. In 1853 he was ordained to Eastwood, the parish he served for more than five decades until his death. In his time a new manse, church, and parish school were erected. At his induction, Sir John and Lady Matilda Maxwell, George Campbell's patrons, treated him to a "sumptuous banquet" at the Star Hotel, Glasgow, in the presence of numerous clergymen, the service having been conducted by the Rev Andrew Wilson of the Abbey, Paisley.Months after his induction, Campbell advertised for a parish schoolmaster for the growing district, "competent to teach all the branches of an English Education, together with Latin and Greek, and at least one Modern Language." A "maximum Salary" was offered for the strenuous position, to which were added duties as the parish's Session Clerk. In 1855, not long after he had started out as a minister, thieves forcibly broke into Eastwood manse and stole a large amount of silver plate and other items, including silver sacramental cups belonging to the church.

On 31 January 1865, George Campbell was a co-founder of the Church Service Society, whose purpose it was to study the liturgies of the Christian church and to prepare and publish forms of prayer for public worship and services for the administration of the sacraments in the Church of Scotland, and its members included high-ranking Scottish clergymen. Rev Campbell was the society's secretary.The historical work "Renascence of Worship" by Rev John Kerr includes Church Service Society co-founder Rev George Campbell’s summary of the origins of the "very first formation" of the ecclesiastical organisation:

[...] I may say that, in, I think, the month of November 1864, I was assisting at the Communion in a country parish in the neighbourhood, where I spent several days with Dr Cameron Lees, then of Paisley, and a co-Presbyter of my own. Our minds were full, as were those of many others at the time, of improvements in Church services. I had been taken with the idea of a Society for the purpose first propounded by Dr Sprott in a pamphlet shortly before published by him, bearing the title of, ‘The Worship, Rites and Ceremonies of the Church of Scotland,’ or such like. You will see, therefore, that the first idea was his, but on account of his absence at that time in Ceylon he was not the first actual mover in the matter. Dr Cameron Lees took it up eagerly, and he often dwells in a conversation with me on a winter morning walk which we took together, and he identifies the very spot on the Eaglesham Road where we came to the resolution to proceed actively in the matter. It was agreed that I was to write to Dr Story and inform him of what we had concluded, asking his co-operation. This he agreed to most cordially, and I recollect that in his reply to me he stated that he had been pondering the formation of a society, with like aims, to be called the Leighton Club. We three conspirators then met in Glasgow and agreed to sound the views of various like-minded ministers, and to invite them to attend a meeting for the purpose. This was held in Glasgow, early in 1865, as your Minutes will show, at which the project was launched. [...]

From 1868 to 1888, George Campbell was clerk of Presbytery in Paisley. This demanding duty involved mediating in controversial cases, such as when a zealous minister complained bitterly that a Roman Catholic school was using books of "decidedly Popish character, containing passages of a kind grossly idolatrous, with superstitions historically false, most revolting to the feelings and principles of Protestants, and strongly calculated to prejudice and mislead the infant mind..." During Campbell's ministry, the parish, on the outskirts of Glasgow, grew significantly. Through his energy, several chapels were erected and endowed in Pollokshaws and surrounding. He was active on all public Boards in the parish, and greatly encouraged education via the School Board.

=== Jubilee ===
Shortly before Rev Campbell's death, in 1903, a festive dinner was given at Windsor Hall, Glasgow, to celebrate the long-standing minister's jubilee, presided by Dr Robert Stirling Maxwell, MP, and attended, inter alia, by the eminent principal of Glasgow University, Robert Herbert Story, whose father, Rev Robert Story had been parish minister of Rosneath in the period when Campbell had been an assistant prior to his ordination, and the Right Rev John Gillespie, who said it was "gratifying to find a better spirit prevailing among the different churches compared with the time when their guest was ordained." Also present was the liturgical scholar Thomas Leishman, of the Church Service Society. At a congregational "conversazione" in Pollokshaws in connection with the jubilee, Rev Campbell was presented with a silver salver and a cheque for £500.

Rev George Campbell made a valuable contribution in book form to the parish history of Eastwood, the later suburb of Glasgow where he spent fifty-one years of his life. The title of his work, Eastwood: Notes on the Ecclesiastical Antiquities of the Parish, is a little misleading insofar as it is mainly a history of the area, named after a long-since-vanished wood, from early Celtic Christianisation until the 19th century, and less about the relics and ancient monuments we normally associate with the term "antiquities". Although these artefacts are mentioned, too, most of the book constitutes a tribute to the many clergymen who served the district over the centuries. Using sources such as Kirk Session records, Campbell does not hesitate to mention negative aspects of Christianity such as stories of witches and the ensuing trials and hangings. As someone who lived in a period when people of modest origin, like Campbell's minister father James before him, were dependent, beside the Kirk, on the support of baronets if they wanted to enter the ministry, and in doing so, become respected middle class citizens, Campbell does not forget to pay homage to his patrons Sir John and Lady Matilda Maxwell. As a token of appreciation, he tactfully describes in detail the contribution the Maxwell family made to the Pollok/Eastwood district. When Sir John Maxwell of Pollok died in 1865, Rev Campbell held the Presbyterian funeral service at the baronet's mansion, Pollok House.

== Personal life ==
Rev George Campbell married Euphemia Harriet Drummond Graham, daughter of William Graham, LLD, of the Scottish Military and Navy Academy, Edinburgh. Campbell's father-in-law was a pioneer of secondary education for girls, having founded the Scottish Institution for the Education of Young Ladies at Moray Place in Edinburgh. A plaque on the building at Moray Place today commemorates this educationalist.

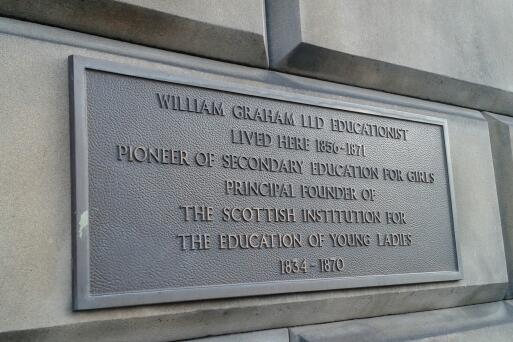
William Graham LLD, Pioneer of Secondary Education for Women

Following the death of Euphemia, a church window designed by Oscar Patterson of West Regent Street, Glasgow, which still adorns Eastwood Church today, was erected overlooking the manse pew, the theme being the Psalmist playing on the harp to commemorate Mrs Campbell’s passion for sacred music. The inscription reads: "To the glory of God, and in affectionate remembrance of Mrs Euphemia Campbell, Eastwood Manse, the women of this parish have placed this memorial on the spot where she so long worshipped, 1896. Lord, I have loved the habitation of thy house."

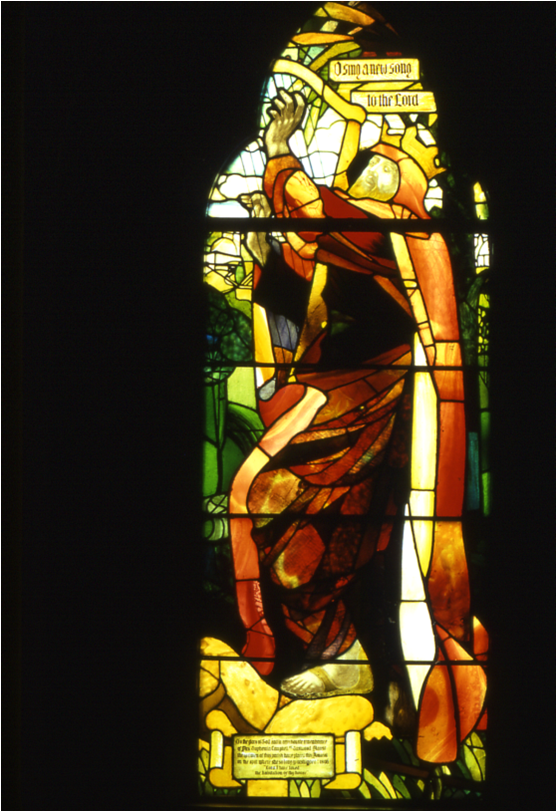
Euphemia Campbell Window, Psalmist with Harp (1896), Eastwood Church

=== Children ===
George and Euphemia Campbell had the following issue:

- Christina Drummond Campbell (1855–89, who married Rev William Smith (1852–97), minister of St Paul’s, Dundee.
- Alice Mary Campbell (b. 1856)
- Matilda Maxwell Campbell (1858–72)
- Very Rev James Montgomery Campbell, minister of St Michael’s, Dumfries, who became Moderator of the General Assembly of the Church of Scotland in 1928.
- William Graham Campbell (b. 1861)
- Euphemia Jane Campbell (b. and d. in 1862)
- Margaret Jane Campbell (1863-1937), married Rev Alexander Murray Macgregor (1856-1935), minister of Lochryan, Wigtownshire.
- George Douglas Campbell (1864–65)
- Edith Graham Campbell (1866-1947, who married Rev Maxwell James Wright (1857-1927), minister of St Ninian's, Aberdeen, and a nephew of Very Rev George Hutchison.
- John Maxwell Campbell (b. 1867)
- Henry Wallace Campbell (twin; 1867–69)
- George Henry Campbell (1869–85)

== Publications and further reading ==
- Eastwood: Notes on the Ecclesiastical Antiquities of the Parish (Paisley, 1902)
- The Renascence of Worship: the Origins, Aims and Achievements of the Church Service Society (Edinburgh, 1909)
- Rosneath Past and Present (Paisley; London, 1893)
