= George Washington Sprott =

Scottish clergyman and liturgical scholar (1829–1909)

George Washington Sprott (6 March 1829 – 27 October 1909) was a Scottish minister and liturgical scholar, known as an advocate of reform of the services of the Church of Scotland, and of its reunion with the Free Church of Scotland.

== Early life ==
Born at Musquodoboit, Nova Scotia, on 6 March 1829, he was the eldest of five children of John Sprott, Presbyterian minister there, by his third wife, Jane Neilson. Both his parents came from Wigtownshire. After early education in the colony, Sprott entered Glasgow College in 1845, where one of his fellow students was Henry Campbell-Bannerman who consulted him about studying for the ministry.

Sprott graduated with a BA in 1849. He had introductions to the families of Norman Macleod the younger, Andrew Kennedy Hutchison Boyd, and Laurence Lockhart, brother of John Gibson Lockhart.

== Years of travel ==
His father approved of his son's decision to join the Church of Scotland, and, ordained in 1852 by the presbytery of Dunoon, Sprott returned to Nova Scotia, to act as assistant at St Matthew's, Halifax. There he served also as chaplain to the 72nd Highlanders, later posted to the Crimea. After visits to Newfoundland and the United States, he returned to Scotland in 1856, and having served short periods as assistant minister at Greenock and Dumfries, he was gazetted to a chaplaincy to the Scottish troops at Kandy, and went out to Ceylon in 1857, where he was the chaplain of Scots Kirk, Kandy for seven years.

In 1865 Sprott left Ceylon and acted for a time as chaplain to the Scottish troops at Portsmouth.

== Scottish minister ==
Sprott was presented to the parish of Chapel of Garioch, Aberdeenshire, in 1866. He opposed the movement for the abolition of patronage in the Church of Scotland, and carried through the Synod of Aberdeen an overture to the General Assembly in favour of celebration of holy communion during its sittings. With the help of Thomas Leishman he procured a recommendation on the use of the Apostles' Creed in baptism. As moderator of the Synod in 1873, he preached at its April meeting a sermon on The Necessity of a Valid Ordination.

After an unsuccessful application for the chair of church history in the University of Edinburgh Sprott, early in 1873, was presented to the parish of North Berwick. At the assembly of 1882 Sprott successfully joined Leishman in a protest against the admission of congregational ministers without Presbyterian ordination. In 1884 he saw the erection of a new parish church. In the summer of 1879 the assembly had sent him to visit the Presbyterian churches of Canada, and also appointed him to a lectureship in pastoral theology. He was disappointed in two further applications for professorships of church history — at Glasgow in 1886 and at Aberdeen in 1889.

Sprott joined on its formation, in 1886, the Aberdeen (later the Scottish) Ecclesiological Society, and in 1892 took a leading part in founding and conducting the Scottish Church Society, for orthodox doctrine; he was founder of the Church Law Society. An advocate of reunion after the disruption of 1843, he supported the efforts of Charles Wordsworth, and the Scottish Christian Unity Association founded by George Howard Wilkinson.

== Last years ==
In 1902 Sprott celebrated his ministerial jubilee of 50 years, but with heart weakness he petitioned the presbytery next year for the appointment of an assistant and successor, and retired to Edinburgh. He died at Edinburgh of heart disease on 27 October 1909, and was buried at North Berwick.

== Works ==
In Ceylon Sprott wrote a pamphlet on the Dutch Church there. Opposing what he was as a drift of Scottish church people towards episcopacy, he published The Worship, Rites and Ceremonies of the Church of Scotland, promoting ideas which resulted in the formation of the Church Service Society (1865). Returning to Scotland, he pursued liturgical and historical studies, and became influential on the editorial committee of the Church Service Society. In 1868 he published a critical edition of the Book of Common Order, commonly called "John Knox's Liturgy", and in 1871 his Scottish Liturgies of James VI.

As lecturer in pastoral theology, Sprott spoke at the four Scottish universities, and published Worship and Offices of the Church of Scotland (1882). His lectures had earned the degree of D.D. from the University of Glasgow, conferred in 1880.

Late in life, Sprott published:

- His John Macleod Memorial Lecture, The Doctrine of Schism in the Church of Scotland (Edinburgh, 1902);
- a new edition of John Knox's Liturgy (1901);
- an edition (1905) of The Liturgy of Compromise used in the English Congregation at Frankfort, 1557, bound up with H. J. Wotherspoon's Second Prayer Book of Edward VI; and
- a new edition (1905) of Euchologion, a Book of Common Order, with historical introduction.

These books were all issued by the Church Service Society. He also wrote an account of his father and of Nova Scotian life, Memorials of the Rev. John Sprott (Edinburgh, 1906), and contributed on Scottish ministers to the Dictionary of National Biography.

== Family ==
In 1856 Sprott married Mary (d. 1874), daughter of Charles Hill of Halifax, Nova Scotia. Four sons also predeceased their father; a son, Harold, a lawyer in Edinburgh, and four married daughters survived.

== Notes ==
Attribution

This article incorporates text from a publication now in the public domain: Lee, Sidney, ed. (1912). "Sprott, George Washington". Dictionary of National Biography (2nd supplement). Vol. 3. London: Smith, Elder & Co.
