= Quair =

Quair may refer to:

- The Scots form of Paper quire used to describe a literary work, as in The Kingis Quair
- Quair Water, a tributary of the River Tweed
