= John Semple (minister) =

Scottish minister

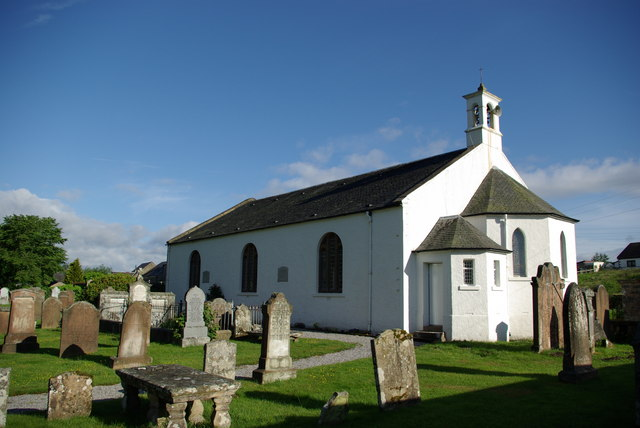
- Carsphairn Parish Church

Personal details
- Born: c. 1602
- Died: c. 1677 Carsphairn
- Denomination: Presbyterian/ Covenanter
- Occupation: minister

John Semple was a seventeenth-century minister who served in both Ulster and Scotland. His Presbyterian principles brought him into opposition to the policies of the civil authorities. Semple refused to take the Black Oath, a stance that brought him into conflict with those sent from Dublin to apprehend non swearers.

He later relocated to Scotland, where he was named multiple times and threatened with severe punishment throughout his life, including in his 75th year, shortly before his death.

== Entry into ministry ==
Semple began his ministry by exhorting the people while leading the psalm-singing. He occasionally served as precentor at a church in County Down; at the time, it was customary to begin divine service with praise, which continued until the minister had entered the pulpit. On one occasion, when a preacher arrived late, Semple "had an impulse" to expound on the psalm which had been sung, and he did it very well. Shortly afterward, he was permitted to begin exhorting in private houses, where many people in various parts of the country heard him.

== The Black Oath ==
Deputy Strafford, then ruling in Ireland, sought to gain favor with Charles I. Two Scottish viscounts (Ards and Claneboy), in the North - on whose lands many of the Presbyterian ministers and people had dwelt - found both themselves and their estates in hazard. And to vindicate them that they had no hand in the business of Scotland, an oath was devised to be imposed on all the Ulster-Scots over the age of 16 as a test of their loyalty. The oath required them to abhor the National Covenant in Scotland, or anything similar, and obey the King's royal commands. This oath, known as "the Black Oath," was reportedly framed by these two noblemen, and recommended by the Lord Deputy, who urged its enforcement throughout the country starting on 21 May 1639.

The generality did take it who were not bound with a conscience; others hid or fled, leaving their houses, and goods; and divers were imprisoned and kept in various gaols for a considerable time. Those who refused to take the oath, had their names sent to Dublin, where 'pursuivants' were sent to apprehend those deemed disloyal. Several individuals were apprehended and taken to Dublin as prisoners, while others managed to escape, despite being actively pursued. Semple is recorded as having narrowly avoided capture by the pursuivants on multiple occasion, evading arrest despite numerous close shaves with the law.

== Carsphairn ministry ==
John Semple became minister of Carsphairn in Kirkcudbrightshire in 1646 and joined the Protesters in 1651. M'Crie records an incident involving Oliver Cromwell, who "marched into a meeting of the ministers in Edinburgh on one occasion. He made a harangue to them nearly an hour in length, in his usual style of rhapsody, and copiously interlarded with quotations from Scripture. The members looked at each other in bewildered amazement, till at length an old minister, Mr. John Semple of Carsphairn, rose up and said : "Moderator, I hardly know what the gentleman wald was at in this long discourse; but one thing I am sure of, he was perverting the Scripture." For this speech the honest minister was punished by six months' imprisonment."

On 23 August 1660, John Semple was imprisoned in Edinburgh Castle by order of the Committee of Estates, who also sequestrated his stipend, 25 September of the same year. He was included in the list of rebels whom the lieges were prohibited from receiving, on 4 December 1666, and in a list of those who were to be prosecuted, 15 August 1667, as well as in the list of those to whom pardon and indemnity were granted, 1 October of the same year. At the request of Alexander, Viscount Kenmure, Semple was granted indulgence at Carsphairn on 3 September 1672. On 10 July 1673, he was fined for not observing the anniversary of the Restoration. When summoned before the Privy Council on 4 August 1677, and threatened with death or banishment, Semple replied, "He is abune [above] that guides the gully [knife]; my God will not let you either kill me or banish me, but I will go home and die in peace." He returned, preached in the parish, and died soon afterwards, at the age of 75. He left a considerable sum of money to the poor of Kirkcudbright.

== Family ==
John Semple had a wife who was six years his senior. Neither her name nor any children are listed in Wodrow.

== Memorial ==
A memorial stone for Semple is held at the parish church at Carsphairn.

== Bibliography ==
- Wodrow's Hist., ii., 348
- War Committee of Kirkcudbright
- Scots Presbytrian Eloquence
- Walter Scott's Heart of Mid-lothian
