= Thomas Leishman =

Scottish minister and liturgical scholar

Thomas Leishman (7 May 1825 – 13 July 1904) was a Scottish minister and liturgical scholar.

== Life ==
Born into a clerical family at his father's manse on 7 May 1825, he was the eldest son, in a family of 13 children, of Matthew Leishman, D.D., minister of Govan, leader of the middle party in the secession controversy of 1843; his mother was Jane Elizabeth Boog, and a brother, William Leisham, became professor of midwifery at Glasgow. Educated first at Govan, he went to Glasgow High School and Glasgow University, graduating M.A. in 1843. After the usual course at the Divinity Hall, he was licensed as a probationer by the presbytery of Glasgow on 7 February 1847, and became assistant minister at Greenock.

From 1852 to 1855 Leishman served the parish of Collace, near Perth, and from 1855 till 1895 that of Linton, Teviotdale, in the presbytery of Kelso. He was among the first to join the Church Service Society founded in 1865, reflecting his views on church matters, and in 1866 he became a member of its editorial committee, where he collaborated with George Washington Sprott. He proceeded D.D. from Glasgow University with a thesis on A Critical Account of the Various Theories of the Sacrament of Baptism (Edinburgh, 1871).

In bad health, Leishman spent the winter of 1876–7 in Spain and Egypt, and investigated Mozarabic and Coptic service-books. In 1882 he joined Sprott and others in a formal protest against the admission by the General Assembly of the Church of Scotland of two congregational ministers to the status of ordained ministers; the precedent was not acted on again. In 1892 he helped William Milligan to found the Scottish Church Society; he contributed papers to its conferences, and three times (1895-6, 1902–3, and 1905–6) acting as its president. He was moderator of the General Assembly of 1898, where Frederick Temple spoke for temperance; the speeches of both Temple and Leishman were published in a pamphlet.

Leishman's third son, James Fleming, was ordained to succeed him at Linton (7 March 1895), and Leishman then moved to Edinburgh. There he died on 13 July 1904, and was buried at Linton. At Hoselaw, in a remote comer of the parish where Leishman used to conduct cottage services, a chapel was erected by public subscription to his memory in 1906. A. K. H. Boyd called him "the ideal country parson".

== Works ==
In 1868 Sprott and Leishman published an annotated edition of The Book of Common Order, commonly called "Knox's Liturgy", and the Directory for the Public Worship of God agreed upon by the Assembly of Divines at Westminster, which became a standard authority. In 1875, he published a plea for the observance by the Church of Scotland of the five major Christian festivals, entitled: May the Kirk keep Pasche and Yule? "Why not", he answered in the words of John Knox, "where superstition is removed".

To a work in four volumes, The Church of Scotland Past and Present, edited by Robert Herbert, Leishman contributed a section on "The Ritual of the Church of Scotland". He defined his ecclesiastical position in The Moulding of the Scottish Reformation (Lee lecture for 1897); 'The Church of Scotland as she was, and as she is' (John Macleod Memorial lecture for 1903); in an address on The Vocation of the Church at the Church of Scotland Congress, 1890, and in lectures on pastoral theology which were delivered by appointment of the general assembly at the four Scottish universities, 1895–7. He contributed to the Church Service Society's series of Scottish liturgies and orders of divine service, an edition with introduction and notes of the Westminster Directory (Edinburgh, 1901).

== Family ==
Leishman married, on Lady Day 1857, his cousin, Christina Balmanno Fleming, who died on 15 June 1868. Five sons and two daughters survived him.

== Notes ==
Attribution

This article incorporates text from a publication now in the public domain: Lee, Sidney, ed. (1912). "Leishman, Thomas". Dictionary of National Biography (2nd supplement). Vol. 2. London: Smith, Elder & Co.
