= Geoffrey Malins =

English filmmaker (1886–1940)

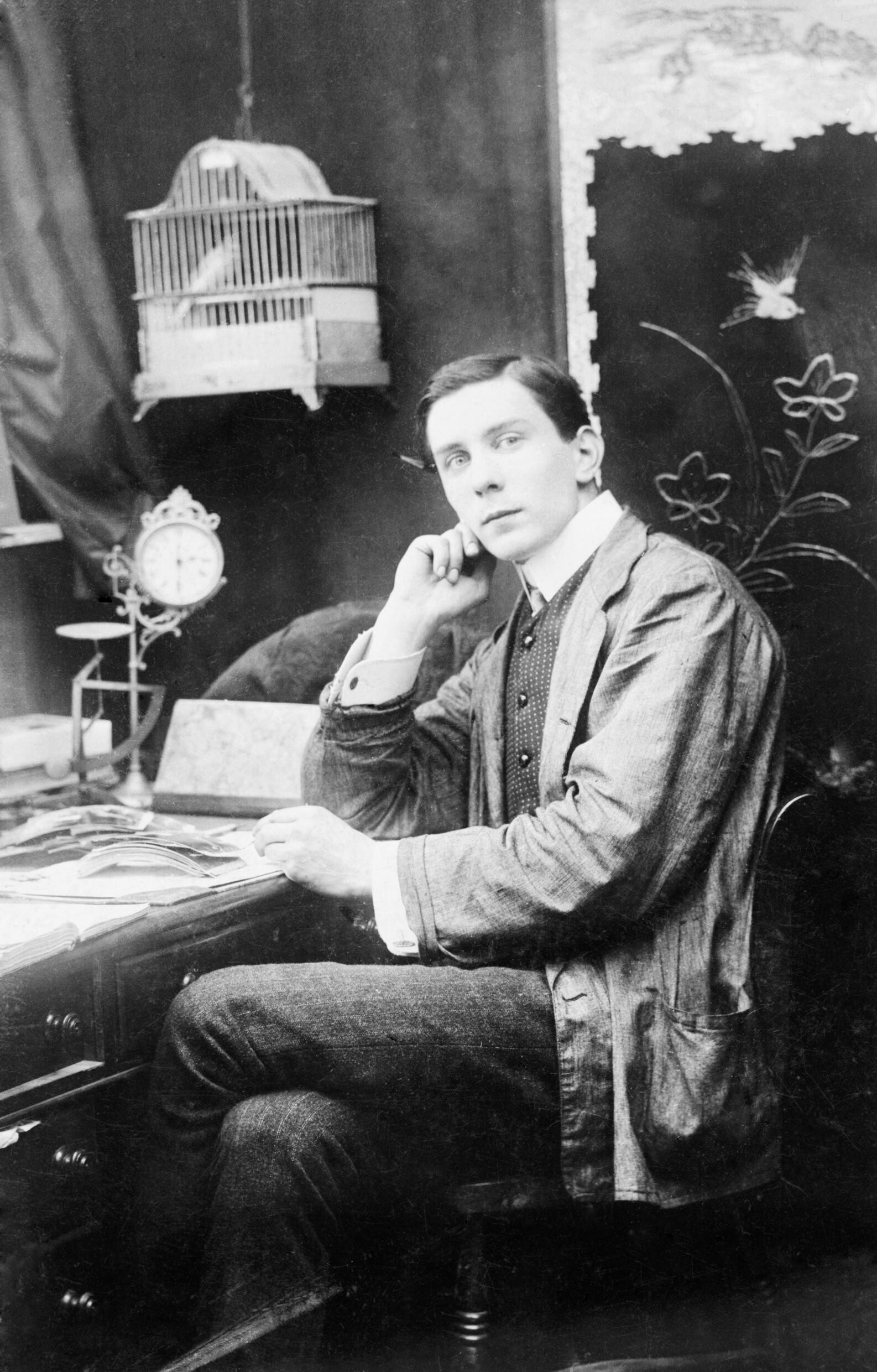
- Geoffrey Malins in his photographic studio, c. 1905
- Born: Arthur Herbert Malins; 18 November 1886; Hastings, Sussex, England
- Died: 11 January 1940 (aged 53); Durban, South Africa
- Occupations: Film director, screenwriter, photographer
- Spouses: Caroline Saywell (m. 1909; div. 1920); Gladys Peterkin (m. 1923; div. 1925); Phyllis Ward (m. 1933)
- Children: 3

Geoffrey Herbert Malins (born Arthur Herbert Malins; 18 November 1886 – 11 January 1940) was a British film director most famous for camera and editing work on the 1916 war film The Battle of the Somme, which combined documentary and propaganda, and reached an audience of over 20 million viewers.

== Background ==
Malins was born Arthur Herbert Malins in Hastings, Sussex, the son of a hairdresser. Starting his career as a photographer, he secured a position in 1910 with the Croydon-based Clarendon Film Company.

== Career ==
=== Film ===
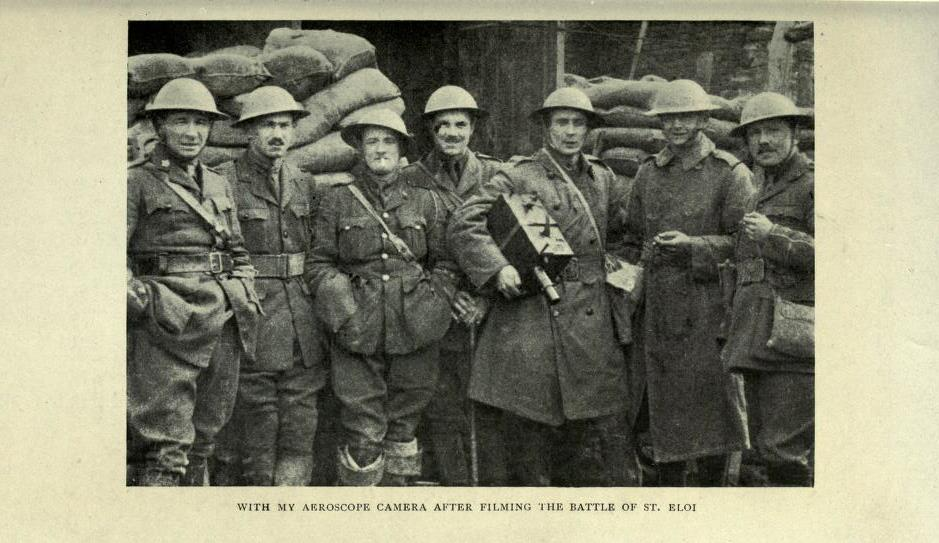
Geoffrey Malins with aeroscope camera during WWI.

Prior to the outbreak of the First World War, Malins joined the British arm of Gaumont. In the autumn of the 1914, the company sent him to Belgium to record footage of the Belgian army in action.

1915 saw the release of a number of song films shot by Malins. These were silent films based on well known tunes such as Abide with Me and On the Banks of Allan Water, designed to be shown with live singers providing a musical accompaniment. Late the same year Malins received a War Office appointment to act as an official cameraman. He was given an honorary rank and sent to the front with an assistant.

The pinnacle of the footage shot by Malins and his assistant John McDowell in 1916 is represented in the feature The Battle of the Somme. The huge success of the film led to the release of The Battle of the Ancre and the Advance of the Tanks, but Malins' work at the front was hampered by increasing ill health. He was invalided out of the army in June 1918.

Malins published an account of his wartime filming in 1920 entitled How I Filmed the War. The book conveys the extremely dangerous conditions under which Malins worked (though it also omits reference to McDowell). In it, Malins described his own feelings towards the Battle of the Somme's initial reception in Britain:

"I really thought that some of the dead scenes would offend the British public. And yet why should they? It is only a very mild touch of what is happening day after day, week after week, on the bloody plains of France and Belgium ... the British public did not object to these realistic scenes in the film. They realised that it was their duty to see for themselves."

In June 1918, Malins was awarded an OBE. The citation commended his work as official photographer "in circumstances of great difficulty and danger."

In January 1919, Malins founded the Garrick Film Company. The company produced at least three films, directed by Malins: Patricia Brent, Spinster (depicting a German air attack on London and promoted as 'the air raid film'), The Greater Love and The Golden Web. The Golden Web had a plot based around the discovery of a gold mine, but the film failed, and the company went into liquidation in August the following year. Malins made at least half a dozen features and several more shorts with London-born actress Gladys Mary Peterkin Mitchell (1892–1986; "Ena Beaumont"), a partner at Garrick to whom he was briefly married.

=== Circumnavigation ===
In 1922, Malins was involved in an attempt to fly around the world in a team that included Wing Commander Norman Macmillan and led by Major Wilfred Blake. The group flew successfully as far as India but no further. A follow-up attempt the following year was also unsuccessful.

In November 1926, Malins started a journey around the world accompanied by Charles Oliver on a pair of on OEC 10hp 1000cc motorcycle and sidecars. The bikes were nicknamed Malins as 'Pip' and 'Squeak'. Malins described the objects of the expedition as being "to create a record for, and demonstrate the reliability of British Motor Cycles, to investigate the position of British films in the various countries traversed; and to secure a film of the whole trip".. The pair set out from London travelling through Europe, the Middle and Far East, Australia, New Zealand, Fiji, Hawaii and San Francisco to New York. The team returned successfully to London in December 1927.

En route, Malins gave evidence to the Royal Commission on the Moving Picture Industry in Australia and "watched D.W. Griffiths [sic] at work directing scenes in an old Spanish setting". He also shot extensive footage of the trip and gave a series of lectures. Malins published an account of the motorcycle journey in 1931 entitled 'Going Further'. In the 1930s, Malins settled in South Africa.

== Personal life ==
Malins married his first wife Caroline in March 1909. The couple had two children, Monica (born 4 June 1910) and Patricia (born 29 July 1914), but by 1917, their marriage had broken down and they were divorced in 1920. In April 1923, Malins married Gladys Mary Peterkin Mitchell (actress Ena Beaumont). The couple divorced in 1925. Thereafter, the latter became the wife of Malins' former flight partner, Norman Macmillan. In June 1933, Malins married his third wife Phyllis Ward, and they had one daughter, June (born 1938).

Malins died from bowel cancer in Durban on 11 January 1940.

== Selected filmography ==
- The Battle of the Somme (1916)
- The German Retreat and the Battle of Arras (1917)
- The Girl from Downing Street (1918)
- Patricia Brent, Spinster (1919)
- The Golden Web (1920)
- All the Winners (1920)
- Our Girls and their Physique (series) (1920)
- Inquisitive (1920) (co-directed with Neville Bruce)
- Series of Ally Sloper short films (1921)
- The Scourge (1922)
- The Recoil (1922)
- The Wonderful Wooing (1925)
- The Changeling (1928)
- London Melody (1930)
