= All the Winners =

1920 British silent film by Geoffrey Malins

- Directed by: Geoffrey Malins
- Produced by: G.B. Samuelson
- Starring: Owen Nares; Maudie Dunham; Sam Livesey
- Production company: G.B. Samuelson Productions
- Distributed by: General Film Distributors
- Release date: August 1920
- Country: United Kingdom
- Languages: Silent; English intertitles

All the Winners is a 1920 British silent sports film directed by Geoffrey Malins and starring Owen Nares, Maudie Dunham and Sam Livesey. It is set in the horse racing world.

It was made at Isleworth Studios.

== Cast ==
- Owen Nares as Tim Hawker
- Maudie Dunham as Dora Dalton
- Sam Livesey as Pedro Darondary
- Maidie Hope as Picco
- Ena Beaumont as Daphne Dression

== Bibliography ==
- Harris, Ed. Britain's Forgotten Film Factory: The Story of Isleworth Studios. Amberley Publishing, 2012.
