= Matthew Leishman =

Scottish minister

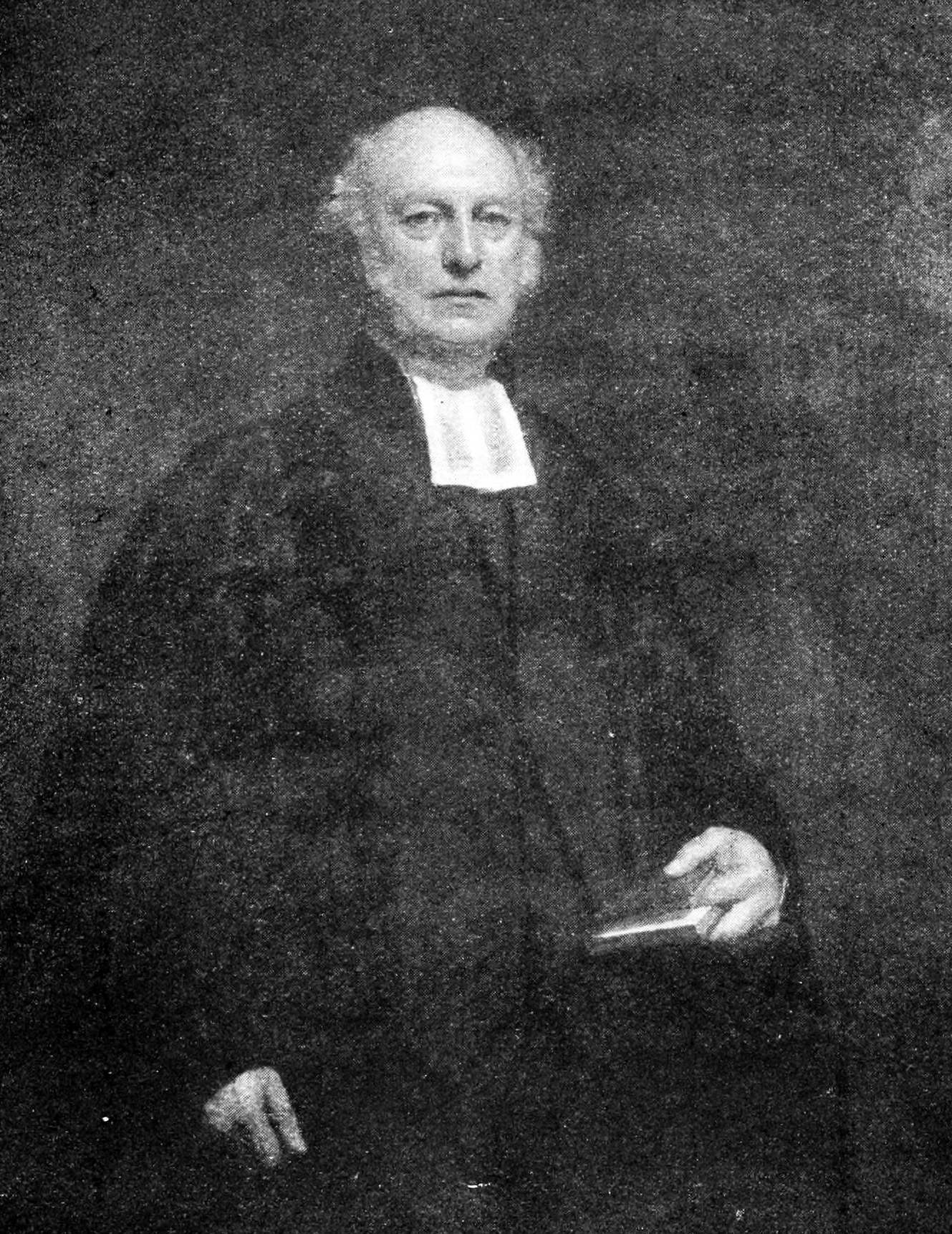
Matthew Leishman

Matthew Leishman (27 April 1794 – 8 August 1874) was a Scottish minister. He served as minister of Govan Old Parish Church for 53 years, during which he served as Moderator of the General Assembly of the Church of Scotland in 1858.

== Life ==
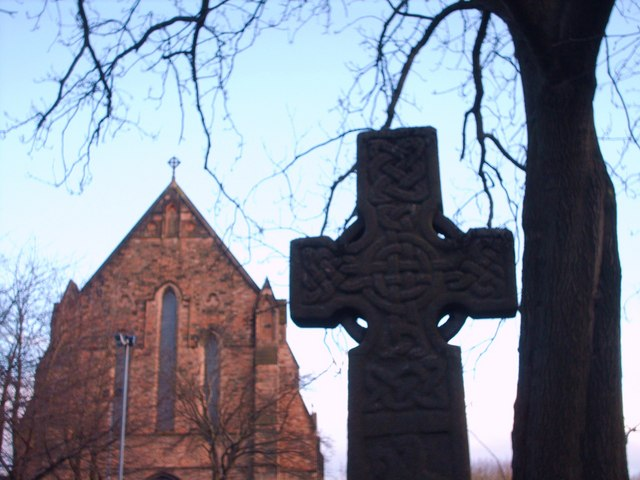
Govan Old Parish Church, with a Celtic cross in the foreground

He was born in Paisley on 27 April 1794. He was the second son of Janet Robertson Foxbar and her husband, Thomas Leishman (born 1762), corn merchant. His mother was said to be a great beauty. He was educated at Paisley Grammar School. He then studied Arts at Glasgow College. He did well and won the “Black Stone Prize”. In 1812 he then went to the University of Edinburgh to study divinity.

As a student he lodged at 5 St James Street in the eastern New Town. During his time as a divinity student, he was introduced by his friend John Paul to his uncle Henry Moncrieff, a man of great standing in the Church of Scotland. He also became a common attendee at the Tron Kirk on the Royal Mile, then under the ministry of Alexander Brunton.

Leishman graduated in 1816 and returned home to Paisley, where in 1814 his father had acquired a new house: Oakshaw House in Paisley. He then waited for a church to minister. In 1817 he was offered a church in Demerara in the West Indies but declined, hoping for a Scottish church. During this period of leisure, in 1818 he took a Leith smack to London to visit a cousin Captain Allan at Northampton Square. During the visit he was introduced to the cameoist, William Tassie. During the visit he heard Henry Brougham speaking at the House of Commons, heard the Bishop of Llandaff preach at the Magdalene Chapel, saw Queen Charlotte pass to a roaring crowd, and saw Edmund Kean play Norval in the Scottish play “Douglas” at the Drury Lane Theatre.

After a busy time in London, he travelled to Dover and took a boat to France. He found anti-British feelings still running high. He continued on to Belgium, where he visited Bruges, Ghent and Antwerp. The highlight of the Belgian tour was visiting the Waterloo battlefield. His group then went to Paris, which he described as a life-changing event.

Returning home late in 1818, he took temporary charge of a church in Renfrew but still sought a permanent charge. Under the Church Patronage Act, connection to a church without a patron was a slow and uncertain process. William Muir of St Stephens Church in Edinburgh recommended him for the church in Dreghorn, but the post was spoken for by Lord Gillies for his nephew, and this patronage usurped his own hopes.

Leishman was a strong supporter of Catholic emancipation during this period (Scotland did not recognise the Catholic church following the Reformation and only acknowledged the church again in 1822). In 1820 he also describes the Paisley Bread Riots. In the spring of 1820, Thomas Leishman, Matthew’s father, paid 2,100 Scots pounds to acquire the patronage of Govan. This was aided by a letter from Henry Moncrieff and finally agreed in September 1820.

In March 1821 he formally became minister of Govan Old Parish Church (previously called the Church of St Constantine), succeeding John Macleod. He remained in this role until his death in 1874 a remarkable 53 years service.

He died on 8 August 1874 in Govan manse, and was buried on 14 August. His wife died 3 weeks later and was buried with him. The Abolition of Church Patronage Act, for which he had campaigned, was passed on the following day.

== Family ==
In June 1821 he was best man at the wedding of Charles Watson (an old friend) to Isabella Boog at Burntisland. The couple were later parents to Robert Boog Watson. Here he met Jane Elisabeth Boog (1803–1874), who was cousin of the bride and one of the bridesmaids. They married on 13 July 1824 in Burntisland.

Their son was Thomas Leishman, and his daughter Isabella Agatha Leishman married David Williamson Runciman and died in the manse at Fossoway. He was cousin to John Wilson aka Christopher North and James Wilson and they spent their youth together in Paisley.

His grandson, James Fleming Leishman of Linton, wrote his biography.
