= List of listed buildings in Carsphairn, Dumfries and Galloway =

This is a list of listed buildings in the parish of Carsphairn in Dumfries and Galloway, Scotland.

== List ==
Name	Location	Date Listed	Grid Ref. (Note: Sometimes known as OSGB36, the grid reference (where provided) is based on the British national grid reference system used by the Ordnance Survey. • "Guide to National Grid". Ordnance Survey. • "Get-a-map". Ordnance Survey.)	Geo-coordinates	Notes	LB Number (Note: Historic Environment Scotland assign a unique alphanumeric identifier to each designated site in Scotland, for listed buildings this always begins with "LB", for example "LB12345".)	Image
Carsphairn Parish Church, Church Of Scotland				55°12′42″N 4°15′38″W	Category C(S)	3677	Upload another image See more images
Barlaes				55°08′29″N 4°08′56″W	Category B	3676	Upload Photo
Carsphairn Parish Churchyard And Mcadam Mausoleum				55°12′42″N 4°15′40″W	Category B	3678	Upload Photo
Galloway Hydroelectric Power Scheme, Kendoon South Dam				55°10′43″N 4°10′46″W	Category C(S)	51692	Upload Photo
Dalshangan Stables				55°10′33″N 4°12′22″W	Category C(S)	3679	Upload Photo
Dalshangan Dovecot				55°10′28″N 4°12′27″W	Category C(S)	3680	Upload Photo
Holm Of Daltailochan				55°13′13″N 4°16′23″W	Category B	3681	Upload Photo
Galloway Hydroelectric Power Scheme, Kendoon North Dam				55°11′23″N 4°11′29″W	Category B	51691	Upload Photo

== Key ==
The scheme for classifying buildings in Scotland is:

- Category A: "buildings of national or international importance, either architectural or historic; or fine, little-altered examples of some particular period, style or building type."
- Category B: "buildings of regional or more than local importance; or major examples of some particular period, style or building type, which may have been altered."
- Category C: "buildings of local importance; lesser examples of any period, style, or building type, as originally constructed or moderately altered; and simple traditional buildings which group well with other listed buildings."

In March 2016 there were 47,288 listed buildings in Scotland. Of these, 8% were Category A, and 50% were Category B, with the remaining 42% being Category C.
