= Norman Macmillan (RAF officer) =

Scottish officer

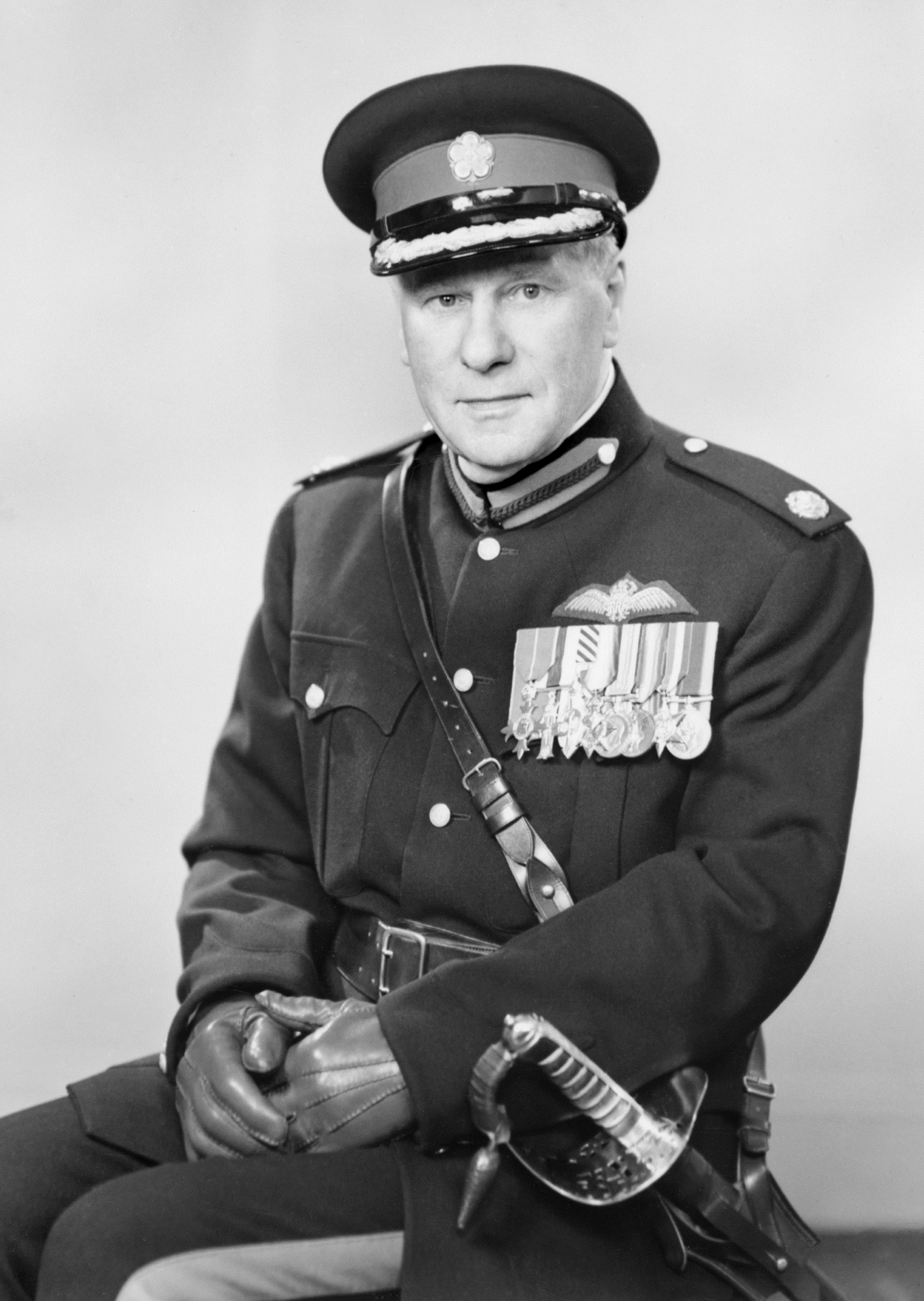
- Born: 9 August 1892; Glasgow, Scotland
- Died: 5 August 1976 (aged 83)
- Military career
- Allegiance: United Kingdom
- Branch: British Army; Royal Air Force
- Rank: Wing Commander
- Units: Glasgow Highlanders; No. 45 Squadron RFC
- Conflicts: World War I; Western Front; World War II
- Awards: Officer of the Order of the British Empire; Military Cross; Air Force Cross
- Other work: Test pilot, author and Deputy Lieutenant

Wing Commander Norman Macmillan OBE, MC, AFC, DL (9 August 1892 – 5 August 1976) was a Scottish officer of the Royal Air Force, a World War I flying ace, test pilot, and author.

== Biography ==
=== Early life and background ===
Macmillan was born in Glasgow, Scotland, the son of John Campbell Macmillan and Jeanie (née Hamilton), and was educated at Allan Glen's School and the Royal Technical College. He was a great-nephew of Rev James Campbell (1789-1861), parish minister of Traquair, and consequently related to Rev George Campbell (1827-1904), minister of Eastwood, and to the Very Rev James Montgomery Campbell.

=== World War I ===
On the outbreak of World War I in 1914 Macmillan enlisted as a private in the 9th (Glasgow Highland) Battalion of the Highland Light Infantry and served in Belgium and France, spending 16½ months in the trenches. He then transferred to the Royal Flying Corps, being commissioned as a temporary second lieutenant (on probation) on 26 September 1916, and was appointed a flying officer on 27 February 1917. Posted to No. 45 Squadron RFC flying the Sopwith 1½ Strutter and Sopwith Camel aircraft, he became an ace, being credited with nine aerial victories between 5 June and 20 October 1917. He was also appointed a flight commander with the temporary rank of captain on 1 September 1917. Macmillan was removed from front line service after a flying accident on 6 January 1918, and returned to England, where he served as a flying instructor. He received the Military Cross "for conspicuous gallantry and devotion to duty" in February 1918, and also the Air Force Cross.

=== Post-war career ===
Macmillan relinquished his RAF commission "on ceasing to be employed" on 10 June 1919, though this was later cancelled. He was re-employed by the RAF and granted a temporary commission as a flight lieutenant on 15 April 1921.

He served as a flying instructor to the Spanish Navy and Army Air Forces, seeing action in the Spanish front lines during the Rif War in Morocco.

In 1922 he, Major W T Blake and Geoffrey Malins made an unsuccessful attempt to fly a Daily News-sponsored round-the-world flight. The first stage from London to Calcutta was flown in a modified de Havilland DH.9, initially G-EBDE, and subsequently G-EBDL which was later donated to the University of Benares. The second stage from Calcutta to Vancouver ended with the loss of the aircraft, Fairey IIIC floatplane G-EBDI, in the Bay of Bengal. Macmillan would subsequently write of the attempt in his 1937 book, Freelance Pilot. The flying journal Aeroplane appeared to have little respect for the expedition, printing a weekly satirical cartoon based on the then popular Adventures of Pip, Squeak and Wilfred serial, as "The Adventures of Mac, Broome and Wilfred", followed by a satirical letter addressed to "My Dear Pilots and Ground Wallahs".

During the early 1920s, Macmillan worked as a free-lance test pilot, unattached to any particular company. He flew Fairey aircraft from 1921, and also took five Parnall aircraft on their first flights, taking part in the 1923 Lympne light aircraft trials, demonstrating the Parnall Pixie aircraft. Macmillan eventually joined Fairey full-time in early 1925 as chief test pilot and stayed with them until the end of 1930. He then became chief consultant test pilot to Armstrong Whitworth Aircraft. In 1925 he was the first to land (an emergency landing) at Heathrow, which then was a row of cottages in land used for market gardening.

In addition to flying Macmillan wrote numerous magazine articles, as well as books on aviation, including a series detailing the history of the Royal Air Force during the Second World War. Despite being partly written during the war they are remarkably detailed and accurate. He served in the Royal Air Force during World War II as a war correspondent, rising to the rank of acting wing commander.

On 12 April 1946 Macmillan was commissioned as a pilot officer in the Royal Air Force Volunteer Reserve (Training Branch), and was promoted to flying officer on 1 April 1947. On 12 April 1954 his period of service was extended for another four years.

Macmillan also served as the commander of the Cornwall Wing of the Air Training Corps from 1945 until 1958, and was the First RAF member of the Cornwall Territorial and Auxiliary Forces Association from 1947 to 1961, twice serving as Vice-Chairman (Air). He was also the President of the National League of Airmen, a founder associate member of the Institution of Aeronautical Engineers in 1919, and was made an Associate Fellow of the Royal Aeronautical Society in 1928, and in 1929 was one of the founders of the Guild of Air Pilots and Air Navigators, a first Warden, Deputy Master (1934–35), and a Freeman and Liveryman of the Guild.

Among his other achievements Macmillan was the first pilot to fly from London to Sweden in a day; a prizewinner at the first International Light Aeroplane meeting; and was the first British pilot to fly across the Andes.

He was appointed a Deputy Lieutenant for Cornwall in September 1951, and was appointed an Officer of the Military Division of the Order of the British Empire in the 1956 New Year Honours.

In 1963 Macmillan was interviewed for the BBC documentary series The Great War, made to mark the 50th anniversary of the war. In it he spoke about his experiences flying ground attack missions during the battle of Passchendaele, of air combat, and of the differences in the experience of fighting as an infantryman in the trenches and as a pilot. The full unedited interview was made available online in 2014.

Norman Macmillan was married to actress Gladys Mary Peterkin Mitchell ("Pat"; stage name "Ena Beaumont"), Geoffrey Malins' former wife.

== Publications ==
- 1928: The Art of Flying
- 1929: Into the Blue ISBN 0-405-03773-2
- 1929: The Air Travellers' Guide to Europe
- 1931: An Hour of Aviation
- 1935: The Romance of Flight
- 1935: Sir Sefton Brancker
- 1936: The Romance of Modern Exploration and Discovery
- 1937: Freelance Pilot
- 1938: The Chosen Instrument
- 1939: How We Fly (Edited)
- 1941: Best Flying Stories (Edited)
- 1942: The Air Cadet's Handbook on How to Pilot an Aeroplane
- 1942: The Pilot's Book on Advanced Flying
- 1942: Royal Air Force in the World War, Volume 1 1919–1940; Aftermath of War, Prelude to the Blitzkrieg, the Campaign in Norway
- 1944: Royal Air Force in the World War, Volume 2 1940–1941; The Battles of Holland, Belgium and France, the Battle of Britain
- 1949: Royal Air Force in the World War, Volume 3 1940–1945; The Battles of North Africa, Mediterranean, Sicily, Italy, Middle East and Eastern Africa
- 1950: Royal Air Force in the World War, Volume 4 1940–1945; The Bomber Offensive, the Battle of the Atlantic, Battles in Europe 1944, Battles in the Far East
- 1950: Where Shall We Go? (Edited)
- 1955: Great Airman
- 1960: Great Aircraft
- 1963: Tales of Two Air Wars
- 1964: Great Flights and Air Adventures, From Balloons to Spacecraft
- 1967: Wings of Fate – Strange True Tales of the Vintage Flying Days ISBN 0-7135-0692-X
- 1973: Offensive Patrol: The Story of the RNAS, RFC and RAF in Italy, 1917–18 ISBN 0-09-116180-0

Macmillan also gave a talk on BBC Radio on 17 October 1923, a transcript of which was published in the 23 November 1923 edition of The Radio Times.

== Bibliography ==
- Taylor, H. A. (1974). Fairey Aircraft since 1915. London: Putnam Publishing. ISBN 0-370-00065-X.
- Wixey, Kenneth (1990). Parnall Aircraft since 1914. Annapolis: Naval Institute Press. ISBN 1-55750-930-1.
