= Thomas Jackson (physicist) =

Scottish physicist

Thomas Jackson FRSE LLD (1773-1837) was a Scottish physicist operating in the early 19th century.

== Life ==
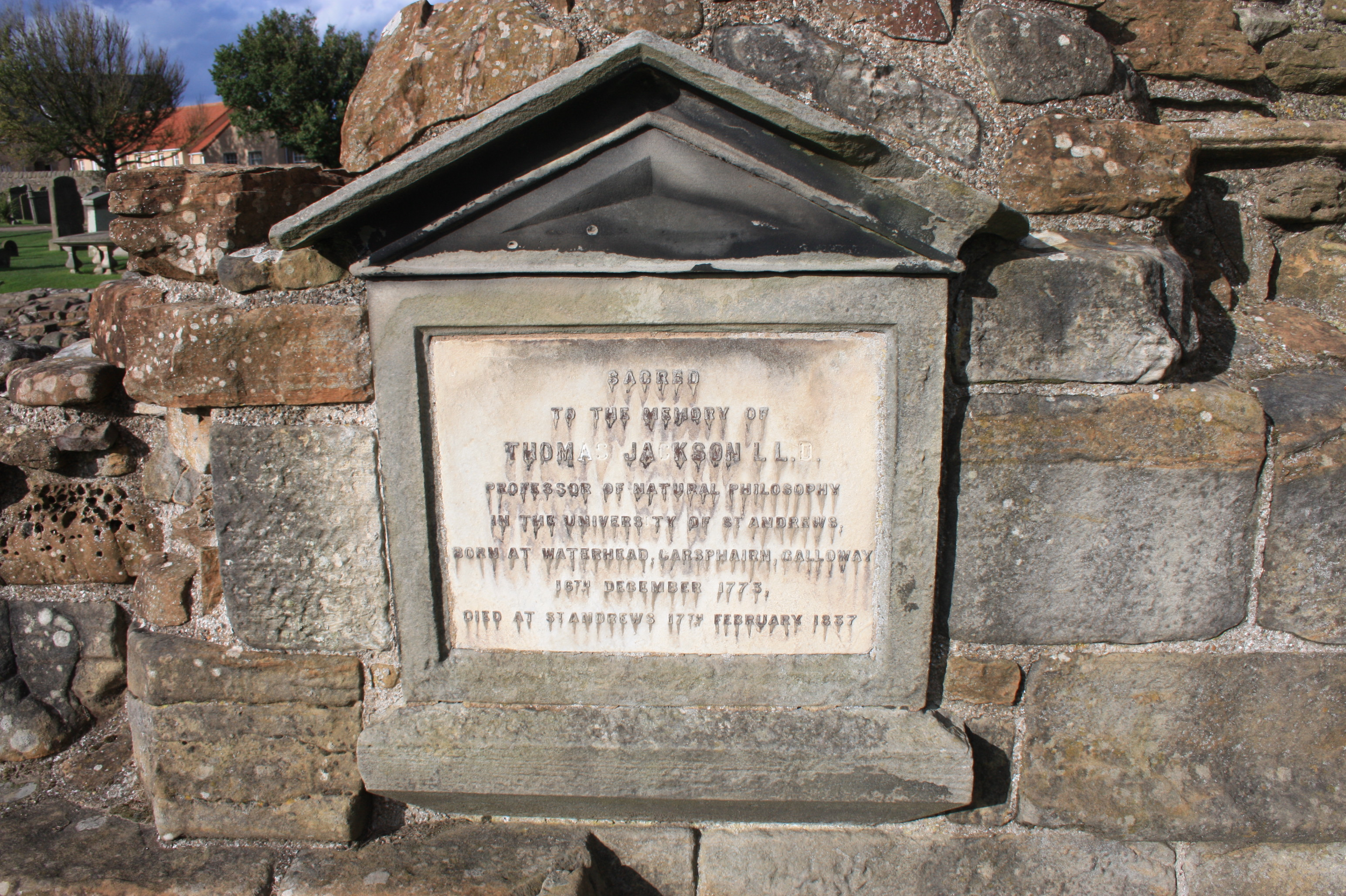
The grave of Prof Thomas Jackson, St Andrews Cathedral graveyard

He was born on 16 December 1773 the eldest son of Thomas Jackson a farmer at Waterhead Farm, Carsphairn in Dumfries and Galloway in south-west Scotland.

He was sent to Glasgow University graduating MA in 1794. After some years teaching Natural Philosophy (Physics) as assistant professor at Glasgow University he became rector of Ayr Academy in 1799 and remained in that role until 1809. He then took up a full professorship at St Andrews University, again in Natural Philosophy.

In 1810 Glasgow University awarded him an honorary doctorate (LLD). In 1816 he was elected a Fellow of the Royal Society of Scotland. His proposers were John Playfair, Sir David Brewster and John Murray.

He was a member of the Astronomical Society of London in 1822.

He died on 17 February 1837 in St Andrews. He is buried in the graveyard of St Andrews Cathedral. The grave lies on the south face of the eastern ruins.
