= List of listed buildings in Traquair, Scottish Borders =

This is a list of listed buildings in the parish of Traquair in the Scottish Borders, Scotland.

== List ==
Name	Location	Date Listed	Grid Ref. (Note: Sometimes known as OSGB36, the grid reference (where provided) is based on the British national grid reference system used by the Ordnance Survey. • "Guide to National Grid". Ordnance Survey. • "Get-a-map". Ordnance Survey.)	Geo-coordinates	Notes	LB Number (Note: Historic Environment Scotland assign a unique alphanumeric identifier to each designated site in Scotland, for listed buildings this always begins with "LB", for example "LB12345".)	Image
Kailzie Home Farm Including Farmhouse, Stables, Byres, Saw And Threshing Mills				55°38′02″N 3°08′51″W	Category B	15442	Upload Photo
Traquair Village, The Bield				55°36′01″N 3°03′51″W	Category C(S)	15433	Upload Photo
The Glen, 1-3 (Inclusive) Fethan View				55°35′25″N 3°06′38″W	Category C(S)	49379	Upload Photo
The Glen, Glen Farm Steading				55°35′10″N 3°07′07″W	Category B	49381	Upload Photo
The Glen, Lion Gateway, Garden Features And Terraces				55°35′09″N 3°06′54″W	Category A	49386	Upload Photo
The Glen, Old School House (Formerly Estate School And School Master's House)				55°35′18″N 3°06′45″W	Category B	49388	Upload Photo
The Glen, Piggery				55°35′08″N 3°07′10″W	Category B	49390	Upload Photo
The Glen, The Temple				55°34′49″N 3°07′03″W	Category A	49395	Upload Photo
Traquair Mill House And Bothy				55°35′57″N 3°04′06″W	Category B	49405	Upload Photo
Traquair Village, Bolt Cottage And Forester's Cottage				55°36′05″N 3°03′48″W	Category C(S)	49406	Upload Photo
Kailzie, Dovecote				55°38′09″N 3°08′32″W	Category A	15439	Upload Photo
Juniperbank Including Walled Garden, Boundary Walls And Gatepiers				55°37′32″N 2°59′44″W	Category C(S)	15421	Upload Photo
Birkinshaw, Sundials And Carved Stones				55°35′52″N 3°03′45″W	Category B	15422	Upload Photo
Traquair House Policies, Bear Gates And Avenue Head Cottages (4 Dwellings)				55°36′19″N 3°04′16″W	Category A	15430	Upload another image See more images
Traquair Mill (Saw Mill And Associated Buildings)				55°35′56″N 3°04′05″W	Category B	15432	Upload Photo
Cardrona Mains Farmhouse And Ice House				55°38′23″N 3°06′39″W	Category C(S)	15437	Upload Photo
Kailzie, Former Game Larders				55°38′09″N 3°08′31″W	Category C(S)	49369	Upload Photo
Kailzie, Scots Mill, Miller's House				55°38′26″N 3°09′17″W	Category B	49370	Upload Photo
Kailzie, Walled Kitchen Garden, Glasshouses, Garden House (Formerly Head Gardener's House), Sundial, Gates And Railings				55°38′05″N 3°08′42″W	Category B	49371	Upload Photo
The Glen, Factor's House				55°35′06″N 3°07′05″W	Category B	49378	Upload Photo
The Glen, Garden Cottage				55°35′10″N 3°07′02″W	Category B	49380	Upload Photo
Traquair House Policies, Craft Workshops				55°36′25″N 3°03′54″W	Category B	49398	Upload Photo
The Glen, House And Service Wing				55°35′09″N 3°06′55″W	Category A	19746	Upload another image
Haughhead, Viaduct				55°37′07″N 3°02′55″W	Category B	15423	Upload Photo
Cardrona House, Lodge				55°37′59″N 3°06′19″W	Category C(S)	49365	Upload Photo
Kirkburn, Former William Cree Memorial Church				55°38′00″N 3°07′36″W	Category B	49372	Upload Photo
The Glen, Entrance Lodge, Gateway And Gates				55°35′27″N 3°06′13″W	Category B	49377	Upload Photo
The Glen, Silo View And Nursery Cottages				55°35′10″N 3°07′04″W	Category C(S)	49392	Upload Photo
The Glen, Swimming Pool And Terrace				55°35′10″N 3°06′57″W	Category B	49394	Upload Photo
The Glen, Walled Garden Including Glasshouse And Shed Range, Steps, Gatepiers And Gates				55°35′10″N 3°07′04″W	Category B	49396	Upload Photo
Traquair House, Exedra				55°36′27″N 3°03′55″W	Category B	49401	Upload Photo
Traquair House Policies, Garden House (Now Brewer's House) And Outbuildings				55°36′24″N 3°03′56″W	Category B	49402	Upload Photo
Traquair House, Tearoom (Former Coachman And Under-Gardener's Cottage)				55°36′25″N 3°03′58″W	Category B	49403	Upload Photo
Kirkhouse Lodge				55°35′30″N 3°04′39″W	Category B	49653	Upload Photo
Kailzie, Stable Courtyard				55°38′07″N 3°08′37″W	Category B	15441	Upload Photo
Kailzie, Scots Mill				55°38′26″N 3°09′17″W	Category B	15420	Upload Photo
Traquair House Including Wings, Terraces, Pavilions, Courtyard Screen Walls, Gatepiers, Railings And Gates				55°36′30″N 3°03′50″W	Category A	15429	Upload another image See more images
The Glen, Bridge And Courtyard Entrance				55°35′11″N 3°06′54″W	Category B	49375	Upload Photo
The Glen, K6 Telephone Kiosk				55°35′12″N 3°07′00″W	Category B	49384	Upload Photo
The Glen, Kennels And House				55°35′27″N 3°06′32″W	Category B	49385	Upload Photo
The Glen, Old Walled Garden Including Gatepiers And Gates				55°35′12″N 3°07′08″W	Category C(S)	49389	Upload Photo
Traquair House Policies, Bridge On East Drive				55°36′24″N 3°03′44″W	Category B	49397	Upload Photo
Traquair House Policies, Summerhouse				55°36′21″N 3°03′57″W	Category A	19391	Upload Photo
Kailzie, Lodges, Gatepiers And Gates				55°38′17″N 3°08′50″W	Category B	15440	Upload Photo
Knowebridge Over Quair Water				55°36′08″N 3°04′02″W	Category B	15431	Upload Photo
Traquair Village, War Memorial				55°36′03″N 3°03′51″W	Category B	15434	Upload Photo
Kailzie, East Lodge				55°38′06″N 3°07′33″W	Category C(S)	49368	Upload Photo
The Glen, Hall				55°35′09″N 3°07′06″W	Category C(S)	49382	Upload Photo
The Glen, House And Kennels Near Gentle's Wood (Feachan Castle)				55°35′10″N 3°07′15″W	Category C(S)	49383	Upload Photo
Cardrona House				55°37′47″N 3°06′23″W	Category B	19747	Upload Photo
Traquair Village, K6 Telephone Kiosk Near War Memorial				55°36′04″N 3°03′49″W	Category B	19113	Upload Photo
Traquair Parish Church Including Churchyard				55°35′24″N 3°04′49″W	Category B	15419	Upload Photo
Kirkbride House (Formerly Traquair Manse) And Outbuildings				55°35′25″N 3°04′48″W	Category B	15428	Upload Photo
Howford House Including Gatepiers				55°36′54″N 3°05′14″W	Category B	49366	Upload another image See more images
Innerleithen, Tweed Bridge				55°36′46″N 3°03′34″W	Category C(S)	49367	Upload Photo
The Glen, Bridge Near Shrubbery				55°35′12″N 3°07′03″W	Category C(S)	49376	Upload Photo
The Glen, Octagonal Dairy				55°35′07″N 3°07′06″W	Category B	49387	Upload Photo
Traquair House, East Lodge Including Gatepiers, Gates And Boundary Walls				55°36′25″N 3°03′40″W	Category B	49399	Upload Photo
Traquair House, Walled Garden				55°36′23″N 3°03′59″W	Category B	49404	Upload another image
Cardrona, Dovecote				55°37′49″N 3°06′26″W	Category B	15435	Upload Photo
Kirkhouse, And Entrance Gatepiers				55°35′26″N 3°04′42″W	Category B	49373	Upload Photo
The Glen, 1 And 2 Sawmill Cottages				55°35′12″N 3°07′03″W	Category C(S)	49391	Upload Photo
The Glen, Stable Courtyard				55°35′11″N 3°06′56″W	Category A	49393	Upload Photo
Traquair House Policies, Estate Office (Bear Cottage)				55°36′26″N 3°03′57″W	Category B	49400	Upload Photo
Cardrona Mains, Cart Shed				55°38′22″N 3°06′41″W	Category C(S)	15438	Upload Photo
The Glen, Anvil Cottage				55°35′12″N 3°07′01″W	Category C(S)	49374	Upload Photo

== Key ==
The scheme for classifying buildings in Scotland is:

- Category A: "buildings of national or international importance, either architectural or historic; or fine, little-altered examples of some particular period, style or building type."
- Category B: "buildings of regional or more than local importance; or major examples of some particular period, style or building type, which may have been altered."
- Category C: "buildings of local importance; lesser examples of any period, style, or building type, as originally constructed or moderately altered; and simple traditional buildings which group well with other listed buildings."

In March 2016 there were 47,288 listed buildings in Scotland. Of these, 8% were Category A, and 50% were Category B, with the remaining 42% being Category C.
