= Wilfred Theodore Blake =

Major Wilfred Theodore Blake (1894–1968) was an English pioneer aviator, travel writer and traveller. He served with the Oxfordshire and Buckinghamshire Light Infantry.

It was Blake who led the first attempt to fly round the world in 1922. The pilot for this mission was Norman Macmillan. The aircraft used were to include a de Havilland DH.9 bought from the Royal Air Force for the London to Calcutta stage, a Fairey IIIC floatplane for the Calcutta to Vancouver stage, again the DH.9 for the Vancouver to Montreal stage, and a Felixstowe F.3 flying boat for the trans-Atlantic stage. Blake's ambitious round-the-world trip was cancelled after the second stage of the flight came to grief in the waters of the Bay of Bengal. Macmillan would subsequently write of the attempt in his 1937 book, Freelance Pilot .

In 1951, he drove his Standard Vanguard motor car on a record journey around South America from La Paz to Rio de Janeiro taking in Peru, Chile, Argentina and Paraguay along the way.

In 1959, he and his wife drove around the Central African Federation, again in a Standard Vanguard, at the invitation of the Federation Government, meeting both Roy Welensky and Edgar Whitehead, the Prime Ministers of the Federation and Southern Rhodesia respectively. Welensky impressed him greatly, Whitehead less so. Blake had visited many of the places he now saw twenty five years before and marvelled at the great changes wrought to the country. He produced a readable, if uncritical, book of his journey Rhodesia and Nyasaland Journey published in 1960. Now rather dated it is nevertheless a useful social history of the period – he several times notes how many ex-RAF men there were in Southern Rhodesia and their likely influence on its politics.

There is a bench in his memory at St Columb Major Parish Church, Cornwall. He lived in St Columb in the latter part of his life before moving to Mijas in Spain, with his wife Ruby. He died in Spain in 1968 and is buried in the RAF section of the military cemetery in Gibraltar. The ashes of his wife Ruby are buried with him.

== Bibliography ==
Title	Specifications
The Pampas and the Andes	Cassell and Company Ltd. London. First published 1952
Ports of Call	London, Grayson & Grayson. (1933)
Flying Round the World	London, Heath Cranton Limited. Extracted from The Geographical Journal. Vol LXI No 4. April 1923., 1923.
Flying	George Allen & Unwin Limited, London, 1923
Desert Adventures	None
Thailand Journey	London, The Travel Book Club. (1955).
Travels of a White Elephant: Autobiography of an English Adventurer.	Taplinger Publishing, (1960)
Rhodesia and Nyasaland Journey	London, The Travel Book Club, (1960)
Central African Survey	Facts and Figures of Rhodesia and Nyasaland. Alvin Redman. London . (1961)
Portuguese journey.	London, (1963)
Spanish Journey or, Springtime in Spain	NY, Taplinger. 1960

The following books by Blake appeared under the name of Wing Adjutant

Title	Specifications
The Royal Flying Corps in the War	By "Wing Adjutant". – London, Cassell, (1918)
Plane Tales from the Skies	London & New York, Cassell, (1918) (Tales of dog-fighting over the trenches during World War I )
To-day with the R.A..F.	Cassell, (1939)
Over "Over There"	None
