= James Montgomery Campbell =

Scottish clergyman (1859–1937)

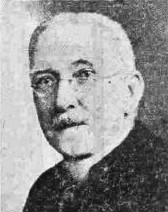
- Born: 26 October 1859; Eastwood, Renfrewshire, Scotland
- Died: 13 February 1937 (aged 77); Edinburgh, Midlothian, Scotland
- Occupation: Moderator (clergyman)
- Spouse: Agnes Guy
- Parent(s): George Campbell and Euphemia Harriet Drummond Graham

James Montgomery Campbell, D.D. (1859-1937) was a Scottish clergyman who served as Moderator of the General Assembly of the Church of Scotland in 1928/1929.

== Origins ==
Campbell's father, Rev George Campbell, was the parish minister of Eastwood near Glasgow, and his grandfather, Rev James Campbell (1789-1861), had been the established church minister of Traquair, Peeblesshire. J. M. Campbell's maternal grandfather, William Graham LLD, was a pioneer of secondary education for girls and a co-founder of the Educational Institute of Scotland.

== Education ==
After leaving Eastwood parish school, Campbell attended the Church of Scotland Normal Training College in the Cowcaddens, Glasgow, before proceeding to the Arts and Divinity faculties of the University of Glasgow. There followed practical training as a so-called student missionary at Lochinver in Assynt parish, Sutherland, then an assistant post at St Clement's, Dundee.

== Career and later life ==
J Montgomery Campbell was ordained as a minister to Wallacetown, Dundee, in 1883. During his time there, he succeeded in greatly expanding the congregation, making it one of the largest in the Church of Scotland. In 1905, he was admitted to St Michael's, Dumfries, where he remained until his retirement in 1930.

In 1924, during the Royal Visit to Balmoral, King George V invited Rev Campbell to preach before his entourage at Crathie Kirk.

Throughout his career, Campbell was a very active public figure, functioning, inter alia, as chairman of the Dumfries and Galloway Royal Infirmary and president of the region's Fine Arts Society as well as in several committees. In 1928, he became an honorary burgess of Dumfries. Apart from holding several chaplaincies, he was a freemason of the Grand Lodge of Scotland.

He was married to Agnes, the daughter of Glasgow lawyer John Guy, who predeceased him in 1935. Very Rev Montgomery Campbell died without issue at Edinburgh on 13 February 1937.

== See also ==
- General Assembly of the Church of Scotland
- List of moderators of the General Assembly of the Church of Scotland

Religious titles
Preceded by Norman Maclean	Moderator of the General Assembly of the Church of Scotland; 1928-1929	Succeeded by Joseph Mitchell
