= Black Oath =

The Black Oath was a 1639 oath that Scots in Ulster who were over the age of 16 were required to take under penalty of a fine or imprisonment.

The oath was aimed at stopping Covenanters: it required rejecting the National Covenant, an agreement signed by many people of Scotland during 1638, which opposed the proposed Laudian reforms of the Church of Scotland by King Charles I; and loyalty or obedience to the king.

The oath was reportedly framed by Hugh Montgomery, 1st Viscount Montgomery and James Hamilton, 1st Viscount Claneboye and recommended by Thomas Wentworth, 1st Earl of Strafford, the Lord Deputy of Ireland from 1632 to 1640, who urged its enforcement throughout the country starting on 21 May 1639.

The imposition of the Black Oath was related to the larger context of religious and political matters leading up to and including the Bishops' Wars of 1639 and 1640 in Scotland and northern England and the Wars of the Three Kingdoms (1639–1653) overall.

== See also ==
- Bishops' Wars
- Church of Scotland
- Loyalty oath
- Plantation of Ulster
- Ulster Scots people
- Wars of the Three Kingdoms
