= Quair Water =

Watercourse in Scottish Borders, Scotland

Coordinates: 55°36′N 3°04′W

The Quair Water is a tributary of the River Tweed in the Scottish Borders area of Scotland. Its name is related to Traquair.

== Etymology ==
The name Quair has a Brittonic etymology. It may be derived from the element *wejr (<*wẹ:drā) meaning "a bend, something curved or twisted" (cf. Middle Welsh gweir, Welsh gwair, gwŷr; in compounds). The name could also descend from *wẹ:Σ- or *wiΣ, both forms of the root *wei which has a basic sense of "flowing", with the suffix –urā-.

Quair may share an etymology with the rivers Wear and Wyre in Northern England, as well as the river-names preserved in place-names like Troqueer in Kirkcudbrightshire.

== See also ==
- List of places in the Scottish Borders
- List of places in Scotland
- List of rivers of Scotland
