= William Milligan =

Scottish theologian

The Reverend William Milligan
- Born: 15 March 1821; Edinburgh
- Died: 11 December 1893 (aged 72); Edinburgh
- Occupation: Theologian

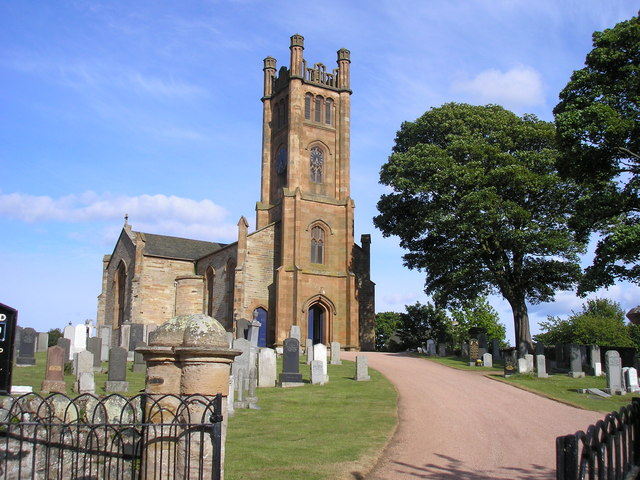
Kilconquhar Parish Church

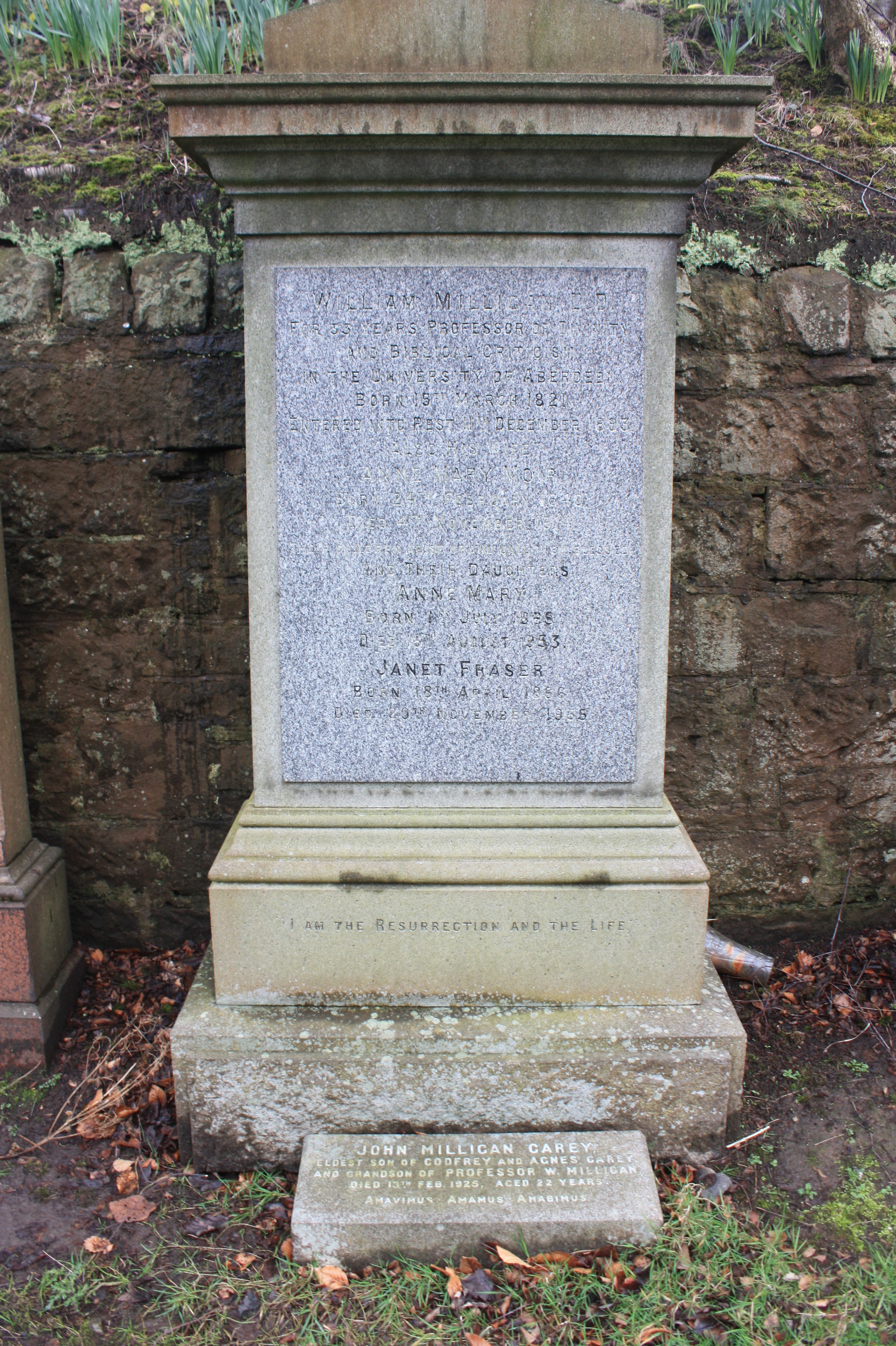
The grave of Rev William Milligan, Grange Cemetery, Edinburgh

William Milligan (15 March 1821 – 11 December 1893) was a renowned Scottish theologian. He studied at the University of Halle in Germany, and eventually became a professor at the University of Aberdeen. He is best known for his commentary on the Revelation of St. John. He also wrote two other well-known books that are classics: The Resurrection of our Lord and The Ascension of our Lord.

== Early life and ministry ==
He was born at 1 Rankeillor Street in south Edinburgh on 15 March 1821, the eldest of seven children of the Rev. George Milligan and his wife, Janet Fraser. His father, a licentiate of the Church of Scotland, was then engaged in teaching at Edinburgh, and from 1825 lived at 1 Rankeillor Street, in the South Side. Milligan was sent to the High School, where he was dux of his class.

In 1832, when his father became minister of the Elie in Fife, he was transferred to the neighbouring parish school of Kilconquhar, and thence proceeded in 1835 to the University of St. Andrews. Though only fourteen years of age, he earned from that day, by private teaching, as much as paid his class-fees, much to his parents' relief, for Elie was a "small living." Graduating M.A. in 1839, and devoting himself to the ministry, he took his divinity course partly at St. Andrews and partly at Edinburgh, and for a time he was tutor to the sons of Sir George Suttie of Prestongrange.

During the schism known as the Disruption of 1843, Milligan adhered to the Church of Scotland, and was licensed to preach as a Church of Scotland minister by the Presbytery of St Andrews in that year. He wrote to his father that he was resolved to "remain in ... and lend any aid he could to those who are ready to unite in building up, on principles agreeable to the word of God, the old church of Scotland." He was at this time assistant to Robert Swan, minister at Abercrombie, and the next year he was presented to the Fife parish of Cameron and ordained there in May 1844.

== Biblical scholar ==
In 1845, his health gave cause for anxiety, and he obtained a leave of absence for a year, which he spent in Germany, studying at Halle. He made the acquaintance, among others, of August Neander, in whom he found a kindred spirit. Promoted in 1850 to the more important parish of Kilconquhar, and in 1860 he was appointed first professor of biblical criticism in the university of Aberdeen. He worked hard, but his liberal politics and mild broad-church views were not congenial to many of his colleagues, and his amiability concealed from his students the real strength of his character. Nevertheless, his power and influence grew, and in 1870 he joined the company formed for the revision of the English New Testament. From that time onward he was a prolific writer. His style, prolix at first, became pure and graceful, and in such works as those on the resurrection and ascension of Jesus Christ and on the Revelation of St. John he took a foremost place among British theologians. In the church courts, too, his rise was steady. In 1872 he was sent, together with the Rev. J. Marshall Lang (now Principal Lang) as a representative from the General Assembly of the Church of Scotland to the Assembly of the Presbyterian church in the United States; in 1875 he was elected depute-clerk of the General Assembly, and in 1886 he succeeded Principal John Tulloch as Principal Clerk.

== Church of Scotland leadership ==
Already in 1882, partly in recognition of his work as a New Testament reviser, he had been elevated to the Church of Scotland moderator's chair. His address on the occasion was notable for its declaration that, in any scheme for church reunion in Scotland, the Scottish episcopalians must be considered. While its enunciation of doctrine concerning the church called forth the warm approval of Canon Liddon, who wrote and thanked him for it. Although in his earlier days his humanitarian feelings, and his enthusiasm for liberty and progress, had allied him with those who were then called broad churchmen, Milligan did not have at any period of his career the slightest sympathy with the disregard for doctrine which has sometimes marked the members of that school.

Ultimately he ranged himself with high churchmen, being, he declared, impelled to join them by increased study of the New Testament. His doctrine of the church he gathered for himself from the Epistle to the Ephesians, on which he had contributed an important article to the ninth edition of the Encyclopædia Britannica. His views on the importance of dogma and on the sacraments he learned, as he believed, from St. John, of whose writings he was a lifelong student and diligent expositor.

This development of his opinions in no way limited his width of sympathy, nor did it interfere with the friendly intercourse, ecclesiastical as well as social, that he had been wont to hold with nonconformists with Wesleyans like Dr. W. F. Moulton, or with independents like Principal Fairbairn. He had been a member for years of the Church Service Society.

In 1892, when the Scottish Church Society was constituted "to defend and advance catholic doctrine as set forth in the ancient creeds, and embodied in the standards of the church of Scotland, &c.", he took an important part in its formation, and accepted office as its first president. The last letter he wrote from his death-bed was to the first conference of this society, then being held in Glasgow. A few days previously he had said that the greatest need of the Church of Scotland was the restoration of a weekly celebration of the eucharist.

Milligan was keenly interested in social and especially in educational questions. In 1888 he went to Germany to inquire about technical education and continuation schools in that country; and the next year he visited Sweden to see the working of the Gottenburg licensing system. In Aberdeen, he was an active philanthropist; and all over Scotland his services as a preacher were in much request.

When on the eve of retiring from his chair at Aberdeen owing mainly to failing eyesight, Milligan was suddenly seized with illness which soon proved fatal. He died at Edinburgh on 11 December 1893. He is buried in Grange Cemetery in south Edinburgh. The grave lies just west of the central vaults close to the grave of Jessie Gellatly.

== Works ==
Milligan's literary productiveness began in 1855, when he contributed the first of a series of papers to Kitto's Journal of Sacred Literature. In 1857, he addressed a "Letter to the Duke of Argyll on the Education Question." The Decalogue and the Lord's Day (1866) was evoked by the controversy stirred in Scotland by a speech of Dr. Norman MacLeod's, as his Words of the New Testament (1873)—written in conjunction with Dr. Roberts—belonged to the literature of New Testament revision.

In 1878, appeared a volume on the Higher Education of Women; and the next year he contributed to the Encyclopædia Britannica his important article on the Epistle to the Ephesians. The Resurrection of our Lord and his Commentary on St. John (in conjunction with Dr. Moulton) (1882), his Commentary on the Revelation (1883), his Discussions on the Apocalypse (1883), his Baird Lectures on the Revelation of St. John (1886), Elijah (1887), The Resurrection of the Dead (1890), The Ascension and Heavenly Priesthood of our Lord, and his presidential address on the Aims of the Scottish Church Society (1892), were all productions of his ripened powers. Besides these he contributed many articles to periodicals. His last article was a notice In Memoriam of Dr. Hort, which appeared in the Expository Times (1893).

== Family ==
In 1859 he married Annie Mary Moir, the daughter of David Macbeth Moir. They had several children. His daughter Agnes Milligan married Godfrey Carey. His son Oswald Milligan became a church historian.

He left unfinished a work on the Epistle to the Hebrews, and forbade the publication of the parts he had written; some of his notes, however, have been used in a work on the same subject, since published by his eldest son, the Rev. George Milligan who went on to be Moderator of the General Assembly of the Church of Scotland in 1923.

His daughter Katherine Elizabeth Milligan married James W. H. Trail. His son William became Sir William Milligan MD LLD.

== Artistic recognition ==
His portrait by George Reid PRSA is in King's College, Aberdeen.
