= Robert Story (minister) =

Church of Scotland minister

Robert Story (1790–1859) was a Scottish minister, known also as a poet and writer.

== Life ==
He was born on 3 March 1790 at Yetholm, Roxburghshire to Margaret Herbert, of a Northumbrian family, and George Story, a parish schoolmaster. After receiving elementary education at home he entered the University of Edinburgh in 1805, associating with Thomas Pringle, the son of a neighbouring farmer.

From July 1811 to the beginning of 1815 Story was tutor in several families, preparing at the same time for entrance into the Church of Scotland. One of his tutorial posts was in the family of Lord Dalhousie, his youngest pupil being James Andrew Broun Ramsay, whose friendship continued through life. Licensed as a preacher in July 1815, Story was in December appointed assistant at Rosneath, Dunbartonshire. Ordained minister of the parish on 26 March 1818, Story was introduced to his congregation by Thomas Chalmers.

Story defended his friend and neighbour, John McLeod Campbell of Row, who was deposed in 1831 by the General Assembly of the Church of Scotland for his views on the Atonement. He was himself threatened by the issue, but it died down. In 1830 his parishioner Mary Campbell professed to have received the gift of tongues; and, though Story exposed her imposture, she found disciples in London, and was given credence by Edward Irving. Her claims led to the founding of the Catholic Apostolic Church.

Story remained in his charge at the Great Disruption of 1843. In 1853 saw a new parish church erected and a supplementary church placed on his southern borders—which he largely paid for—for a young community when Lochlongside was feued. After a period of weak health, he died on 22 November 1859. He was buried in Rosneath churchyard, and a monument by the sculptor William Brodie, was placed on the wall of the chancel in the parish church.

== Works ==
In 1811 appeared The Institute, a heroic poem in four cantos, written by Story and Thomas Pringle. In 1829 Story published, under the title of Peace in Believing, a memoir of a devout girl named Isabella Campbell, sister of the Mary Campbell who later professed speaking in tongues. Story also wrote on his parish for the Statistical Account of Scotland of 1841.

== Family ==
Story married, in 1828, Helen Boyle, daughter of Mr Dunlop of Keppoch, Dunbartonshire, and was survived by her and two children, including the Very Rev Robert Herbert Story, Principal of Glasgow University.

== Notes ==
Attribution

This article incorporates text from a publication now in the public domain: Lee, Sidney, ed. (1898). "Story, Robert (1790-1859)". Dictionary of National Biography. Vol. 54. London: Smith, Elder & Co.
