= Andrew Kennedy Hutchison Boyd =

British writer and minister (1825–1899)

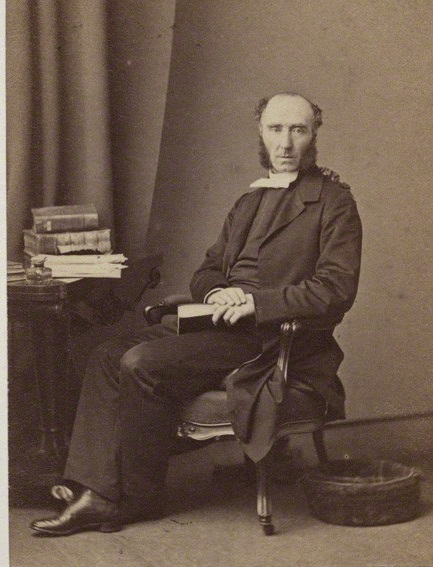
- Born: 3 November 1825; Auchinleck, Scotland
- Died: 1 March 1899 (aged 73); Bournemouth, England
- Occupations: writer, minister
- Notable work: The Recreations of a Country Parson

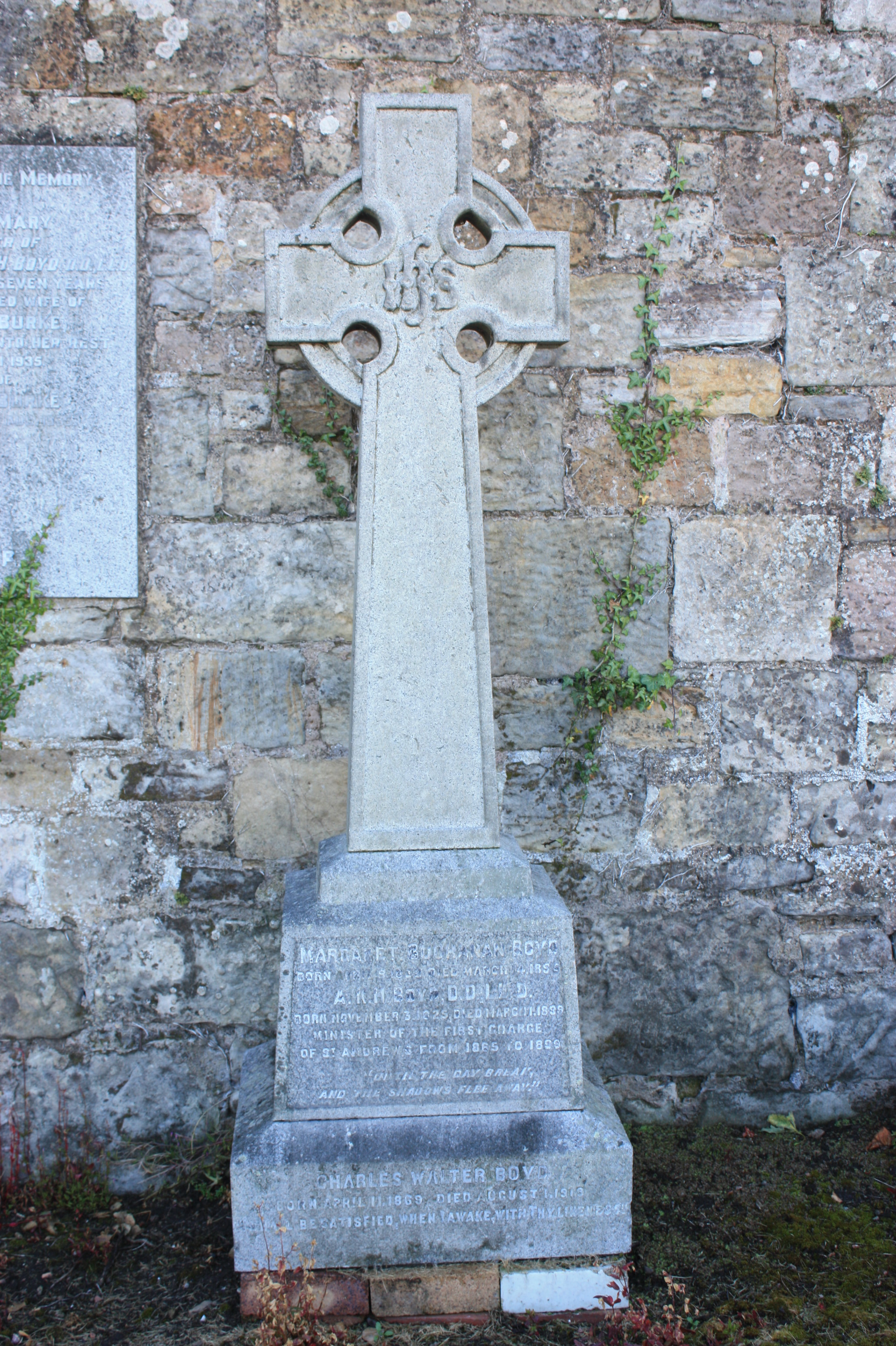
The grave of A K H Boyd, Eastern Cemetery, St Andrews

Andrew Kennedy Hutchison Boyd (3 November 1825 – 1 March 1899) was a Scottish writer, who originally intended for the English Bar but entered the Church of Scotland, and was minister at St. Andrews.

== Life ==
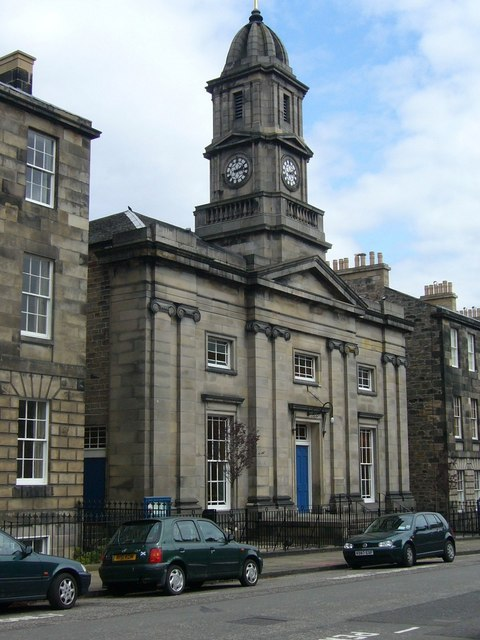
St Bernard's Church, Edinburgh

He was born on 3 November 1825 in the manse of Auchinleck in Ayrshire, the son of James Boyd. He was educated at Ayr Academy. The family moved to the manse at Ochiltree in 1833. His father became minister of the Tron Kirk in Glasgow after he left home.

Boyd later studied at King's College School and at the Middle Temple, London, training as an English barrister. Returning to the university of Glasgow, he qualified for the ministry of the national church. He graduated B.A. at Glasgow in April 1846, and at the end of 1850 was licensed as a preacher by the presbytery of Ayr.

For several months Boyd was assistant in St. George's parish, Edinburgh, and on 18 September 1851 he was ordained parish minister of Newton-on-Ayr, where he succeeded John Caird. In 1854, he became minister of Kirkpatrick-Irongray, near Dumfries. Here he remained five years, maturing his pulpit style, and, writing under his initials of "A. K. H. B.," steadily gaining reputation in Fraser's Magazine with his Recreations of a Country Parson.

In April 1859, Boyd was appointed to the parish of St. Bernard's, in Stockbridge, Edinburgh, and found the presbytery exercised on the question of decorous church service, raised by the practice and advocacy of Robert Lee. Boyd sympathised with the desire for a devout and graceful form of worship, and he was afterwards a member of the Church Service Society. In 1864 the university of Edinburgh conferred on him the honorary degree of D.D.

In 1865, Boyd succeeded Park as minister of the first charge, St. Andrews. Boyd urged the question of an improved ritual in the services of the national church, and in 1866, on the initiative of his presbytery, a committee was appointed by the general assembly to prepare a collection of hymns. The hymnal compiled by the committee, with Boyd as convener, was published in 1870, and enlarged in 1884. St. Andrews University conferred on him the degree of LL.D. in April 1889.

In May 1890, he was appointed moderator of the general assembly. His closing address was published as Church Life in Scotland: Retrospect and Prospect (Edinburgh, 1890). One of his last public services was the reopening, on 11 July 1894, of the renovated church of St. Cuthbert's, Edinburgh. Early in 1895, he was seriously ill, but recovered, only to lose his wife who had nursed him back to health. In the winter of 1898–1899, he had a recurrence of ill-health and went to Bournemouth to recuperate. He resumed work on sermons and essays, but on 1 March 1899 he died by misadventure, having taken carbolic lotion (a 1-in-40-parts mixture of carbolic acid in water) in mistake for a sleeping-draught.

He was interred in the Eastern Cemetery of St Andrews (south of the cathedral), against the south wall, with his first wife.

== Family ==
Boyd married, in 1854, Margaret Buchanan, eldest daughter of Captain Kirk (71st regiment) of Carrickfergus in Ireland. She predeceased him in 1895. Their sons included Frank Mortimer Boyd a journalist and author, Rev Herbert Buchanan Boyd and Charles Walter Boyd secretary to Cecil Rhodes and of the Rhodes Trust.

In 1897, he married, following Margaret's death in 1895, Janet Balfour, daughter of Mr. Leslie Meldrum of Devon House near Clackmannan. She survived him, with five sons and one daughter of his first wife's family.

== Bibliography ==
- Recreations of a Country Parson (Series 1, 1859), (Series 2, 1861), (Series 3, 1878)
- The Graver Thoughts of a Country Parson (1862)
- Leisure Hours in Town (1862)
- Counsel and Comfort Spoken From A City Pulpit (1863)
- Sunday Afternoons at the Parish Church of a University City (1866)
- The Critical Essays of a Country Parson (1867)
- Lessons of Middle Age (1868)
- Sunday Afternoons at the parish church of a university city (1869)
- Present Day Thoughts; Memorials of St. Andrew's Sundays (1871)
- The Autumn Holidays of a Country Parson (1878)
- Our Little Life: essays consolatory and domestic with some others (1882)
- Twenty-five years of St. Andrews, September 1865 to September 1890 (1893)
- St. Andrews and Elsewhere: Glimpses of Some Gone and of Things Left (1894)
