= James Campbell (minister) =

Scottish clergyman (1789-1861)

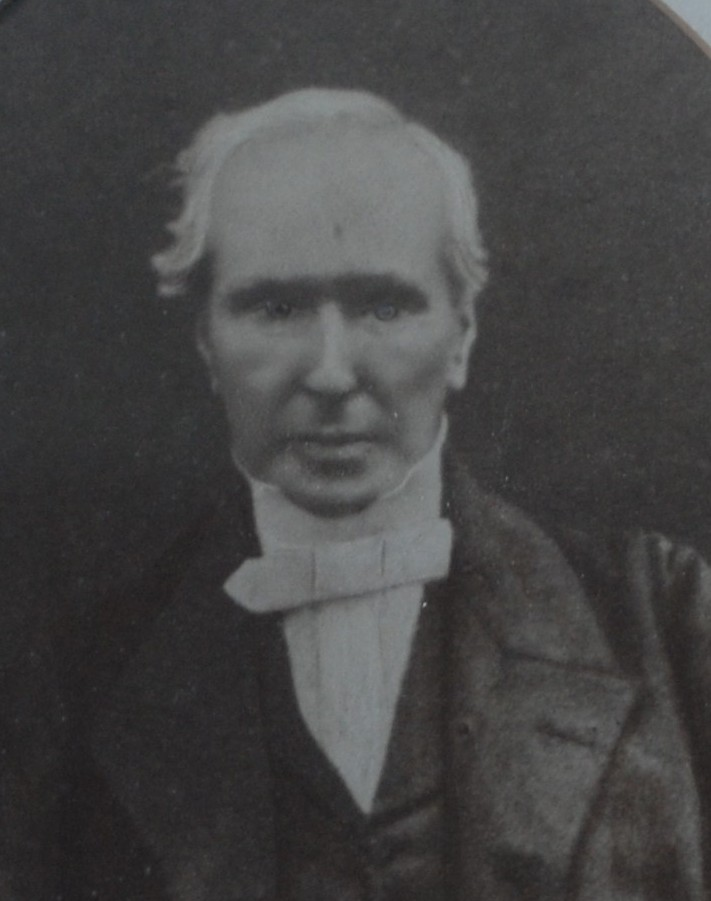

Scottish clergyman and letter writer

Personal details
- Born: 1789 Carsphairn, Kirkcudbrightshire
- Died: 29 April 1861 (aged 72) Traquair, Peeblesshire
- Spouse: Mary Combe
- Children: 7, including Rev George Campbell
- Parents: William Campbell (father); Agnes Riggs (mother)
- Education: University of Glasgow

Rev James Campbell (1789–1861), born in Carsphairn, Kirkcudbrightshire to William Campbell and Agnes, née Riggs, was a Scottish clergyman and established Church of Scotland parish minister of Traquair in Peeblesshire.

== Career ==
After studying at the University of Glasgow, Campbell was tutor to the family of Robert Nutter Campbell of Kailzie, and to the Hart family of Castlemilk, with whom he travelled extensively throughout continental Europe. In 1820, he was ordained to Traquair parish, serving there for forty-one years until his death, after which his son-in-law, Rev Jardine Wallace (1834-1910), who in 1861 married his daughter Agnes Mary, took over as his successor.

== Letters from continental Europe ==
Rev Campbell's invaluable contribution to Scottish history is the unique series of letters he wrote to his father and family. This correspondence, reposited in Dumfries and currently being digitised and transcribed by the Carsphairn Heritage Initiative charity, describes Campbell's travels to France, Italy, Spain and Holland with the Hart family, detailing their flight from France to Spain during the return to power of Napoleon in France, and discusses his search for a suitable parish and writing of sermons on his return to Edinburgh, 1812–1817.

Toulouse, c. March/April 1815

Before you read this you will have learnt from the papers that Bonaparte lucky as ever entered Paris on the 21st. His first business was to dissolve both Chambers of Parliament; Louis is fled into Picardy with a small guard only and to the eternal disgrace of the French character attended only by two Marshals McDonald and Suchet I think there is little doubt that we shall have a civil war but when one observes narrowly the depravity of French morals thy can scarcely make themselves believe that they have either courage or virtue to engage in it. It is quite amusing to observe with what versatility they change sides. […]. The allies will undoubtedly again muster their invulnerable arms to drive the despot from the throne he has once more polluted. You will undoubtedly ask what I am doing at Toulouse. I leave it tomorrow. But I am in perfect safety here. The Duke of Angouleme with his army at Nimes covers the South and South West of France and the people are all exasperated to the highest degree against the tyrant. Conscious however that Bordeaux will meet his vengeance in the very earliest moment, we have no courage to go to embark there. We leave the ladies in perfect safety and Montgomery and I go into Spain to remain there for a month or two to see how matters turn out.[…]

Leghorn (Livorno), 23 September 1815

[...] Leghorn is, of course, a commercial town, and of course contains an amalgamation of all the different races of all the different voices of man. Then whose should I seek for national character or national manner. Shall I examine the turbaned and petticoated Turk, the bearded and knavish Jew, the monkey-mannered Frenchman, the dull and plodding Dutchman, or the money and king, business faced Britons? But you ask me have these driven the Italian from his home, and entirely usurped his place? Not so. We do not exactly witness the same things here as more roaming travellers are called upon to describe in the more uncivilised parts of the globe. We see instead slaves dragging their eternal chains along the streets, but these are not slaves torn from their torrid climates and condemned for no faults of theirs to minister to the grandeur of their makers, they are the slaves of crime, and if I may be allowed the expression, carry the gallows chained to their legs. Here the starkest crimes are never punished by death but with bondage but I know not if this has reduced the instances of deserving death. One thing I know, for I have strongly felt it, the numbers of these wretches makes the heart groan for the depravity of mankind, while if they were buried in the earth or made to herd together, our hearts would bleed more seldom. Whether this would be any advantage, I leave to you and your clergyman to dispute. One thing is that a slave is often happier in his slavery than in his freedom, for the former he has constant employment and regular pay, in the latter he is often threatened with the death of poverty.[...]

== Account of the parish ==
In 1834, James Campbell contributed a particularly detailed account of his parish in the Peeblesshire section of the New Statistical Account of Scotland.

== Family ==
Rev James Campbell married Mary, daughter of Matthew Combe, a Leith brewer, and had the following issue:

- Julia Stewart Campbell (1822–23)
- William Campbell (1824-1902), settled in Australia
- Anne Bruce Campbell (1825–36)
- Rev George Campbell, parish minister of Eastwood in Renfrewshire
- James Campbell (1829–92), settled in Australia
- Agnes Mary Campbell (1833–81), wife of her father’s successor, Rev Jardine Wallace (1834–1910), editor of Poetical Works of Thomas Aird.
- Jane Campbell (1839–71)
