= Scottish Church Society =

The Scottish Church Society is a Church of Scotland society founded in 1892. Leading founders were Thomas Leishman and William Milligan, and the first secretary was James Cooper.

== Background ==
Although always a minority within the Church of Scotland, the Society has at times proved influential. It grew out of the Church Service Society (founded 1865), but has not confined itself to interest in liturgies or form. Cooper was identified with a High Church or "Scoto-Catholic" theological approach within Presbyterianism.

The Society was active in seeking and achieving Article 1 of the Articles Declaratory of the Constitution of the Church of Scotland, defining the trinitarian nature of the Christian faith and the "catholicity" of the Church.

A notable congregation for its historic connections with the Society and with Scoto-Catholicism is Govan Old Parish Church, Glasgow.

== Current officers ==
Twelve former Presidents of the Society have served as Moderator of the General Assembly of the Church of Scotland. The current President is the Reverend Tom A. Davidson Kelly (formerly minister of Govan Old Parish Church), who succeeded the Reverend Douglas Lamb (formerly of St Margaret's Parish Church, Dalry, Ayrshire). The current Secretary is the Reverend Gerald Jones (minister of Kirkmichael linked with Straiton St Cuthbert's, in Ayrshire).

== See also ==
- Ronald Selby Wright - a former President of the Society
- Mercersburg Theology - another Reformed theological High Church movement
