= Traquair =

Village in Scottish Borders, Scotland

Coordinates: 55°36′N 3°04′W

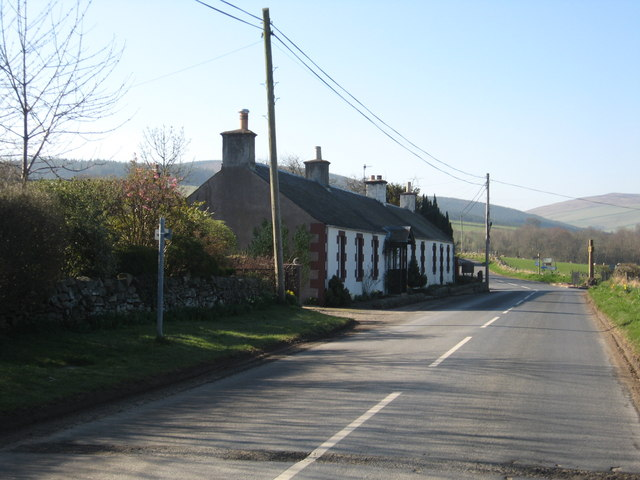
Cottages at Traquair

Traquair (Scottish Gaelic: Cille Bhrìghde) is a small village and civil parish in the Scottish Borders; until 1975 it was in the county of Peeblesshire. The village is situated on the B709 road 2.0 miles (3.2 km) south of Innerleithen at grid reference NT330346.

== History ==
Traquair, said to mean "hamlet on the Quair Water", a river which runs northwards from the hill, Slake Law (2,229 feet (679 m)) to drain into the River Tweed north of Traquair. The village was once surrounded by the great Ettrick Forest and is surrounded by many hills in excess of 1,500 feet (460 m) The area was renowned for the rearing of Cheviot sheep.

In early times the village bore the name Kirkbryde or Strathquair, the Kirkbryde coming from the local church which was dedicated to St. Bride, or Bridget. As early as the 12th century, Traquair was of some importance, important enough to be raised to the status of a Sheriffdom. One of the earliest mentions of the area came in 1107 when Traquair House or Tower was known as a hunting lodge of the Scottish kings and as a refuge for priests. The house was known as Traquair Palace and, in 1176, at the palace, William I of Scotland granted a charter for the erection of a burgh with the power to hold markets every Thursday.

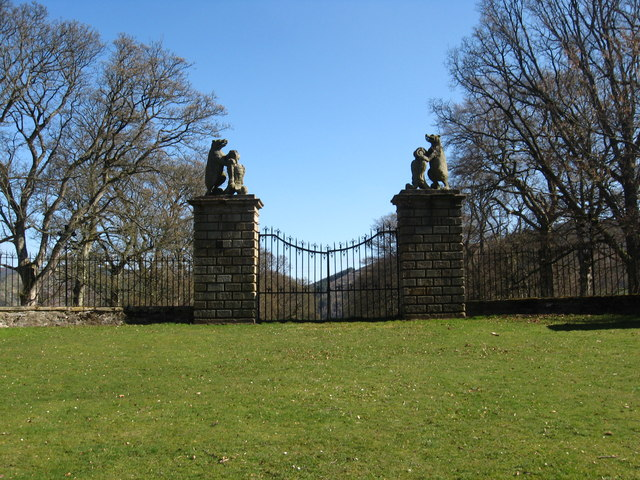
Steekit Yetts ('Stuck Gates') of Traquair House

The burgh which was erected that year at Traquair is known now as the City of Glasgow. Traquair House was one of a string of towers built along the line of the River Tweed as defence of the borderlands against English invasion.

The lands of Traquair were granted by King Robert the Bruce to Sir James Douglas, Lord of Douglas. The manor was later in the hands of the Murray family, the Douglas of Cluny then the Boyds before becoming forfeit to the crown. Robert Stewart, Duke of Albany is said to have granted the lands to William Watson in a charter signed at Edinburgh in 1409. In 1469, there was uproar when James III of Scotland granted the estates to Dr William Rogers. Rogers only lived there a few years before selling it to James Stewart, 1st Earl of Buchan. Rogers, reputed to be a friend and court musician to the king, sold the house to Buchan for 70 Scots merks (less than four pounds in today's money). The earl gave the manor of Traquair to his son, also James, who later died at the Battle of Flodden on 9 September 1513. The estate was elevated in status in 1633 when John was elevated to the title of John Stewart, 1st Earl of Traquair; he later became Lord High Treasurer of Scotland but was later attainted and died penniless. The last of the family, Lady Louisa Stewart, died aged 99 in 1875 and the lands of Traquair passed to her kinsman, Henry Maxwell. Henry adopted the name Stuart and the Maxwell Stuarts still live at the house today. The house is currently owned and managed by Catherine Maxwell Stuart, 21st Lady of Traquair. Modern-day Traquair House is an acclaimed visitor attraction, brewery, wedding venue, corporate hospitality and conference centre.

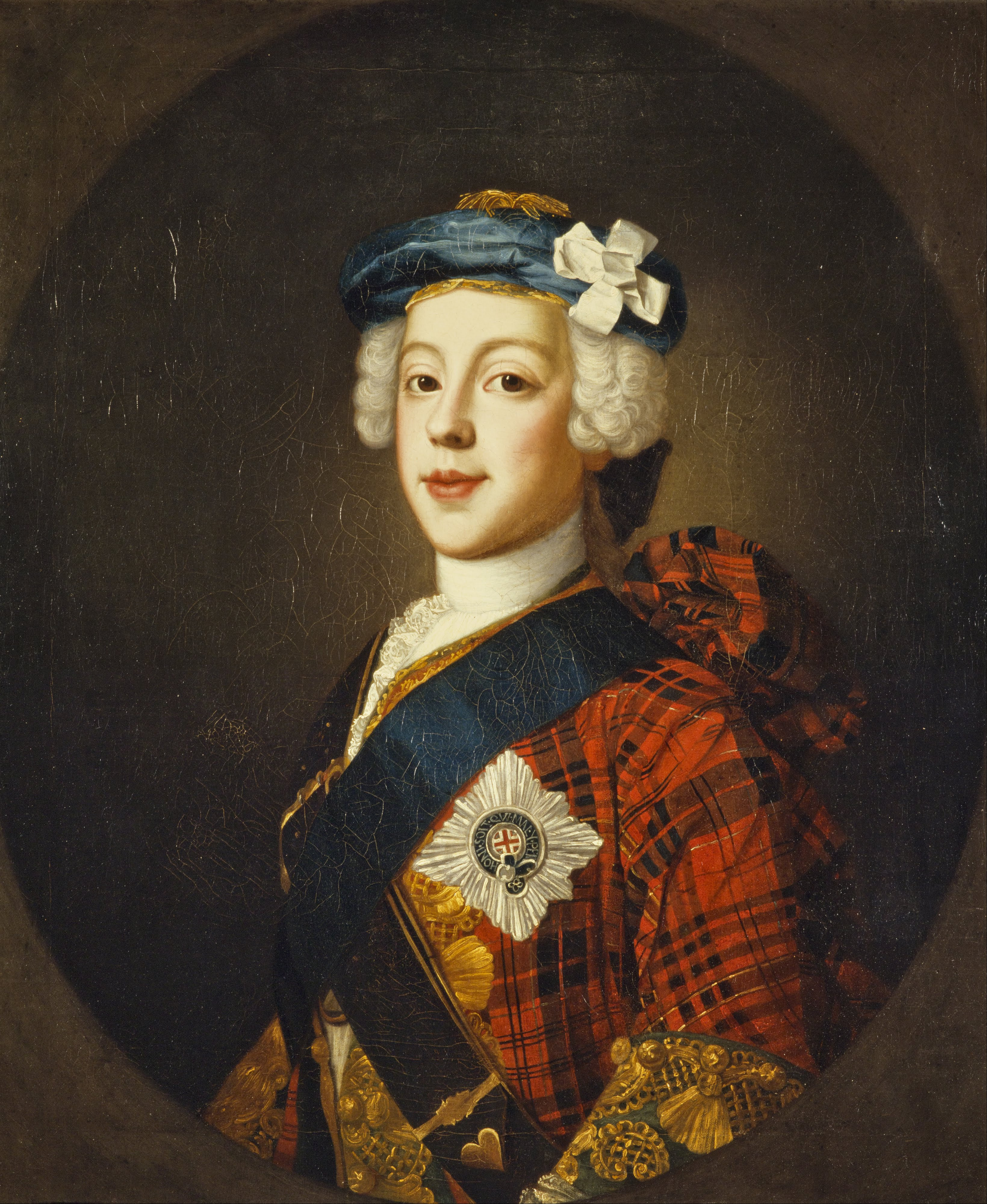
Prince Charles Edward Stewart – also known as Bonnie Prince Charlie

A legend, in two versions, applies to the 'Steekit Yetts' (stuck, or closed, gates), formerly the main entrance of Traquair House. Prince Charles Edward Stewart visited the family during the Jacobite rising of 1745. On his departure, the 5th earl declared the gates would never open again until a Stewart monarch required entry to the house. The second version belongs to the 7th earl who deemed the gates stay closed after the death of his wife, in 1796, and not to re-open until there was another Countess of Traquair.

The Duke of Montrose visited Traquair in 1645 after the Battle of Philiphaugh. Then Robert Burns came to Traquair in order to see a then-famous thicket of beech trees known as the 'Bush aboon Traquair'. A considerable village in the early 18th century, Traquair boasted no less than six alehouses but the local minister stated the locals drank to excess. By the end of the century there was only one pub and the population was said to have halved during that century. At one point, at the same time, there was talk of building a road through Traquair to become the main route between Edinburgh and Carlisle. An Edinburgh man had even offered to fund the building of a new bridge over the River Tweed but the plans never came to fruition and the local roads stayed in a very poor state. A toll bar was built in an attempt to raise funds for roads but was not successful.

The Glen, former home of the industrialist and politician Sir Charles Tennant, 1st Baronet, is in the parish.

== Church ==
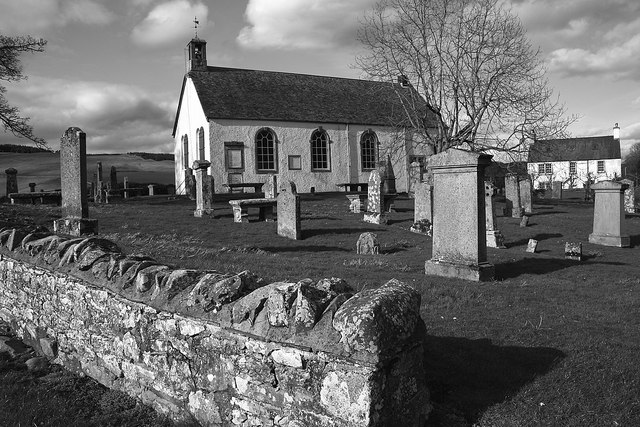
Traquair Kirk

There is reputed to have been a religious establishment at Traquair since 1116, in the See of St. Kentigern of Glasgow. It was dedicated to St. Bride whose holy well was in the glebe. The present church building was built in 1778 around 1km NE of the original church aite.

== Today ==
Present-day Traquair is still a straggling hamlet with only 79 houses and fewer than 200 inhabitants. The parish had a population of 566 at the 2001 census. With no pubs, the centre of activity in the village is the village hall where various local clubs and associations meet. The social gatherings of Traquair are also held in the atmospheric little hall. The hall's committee have adopted an open doors policy and don't cater only for the villagers but for the wider populace too.

The Sir Walter Scott Way long-distance path passes through Traquair.

== See also ==
- Sheriff of Traquair
- List of listed buildings in Traquair, Scottish Borders
- List of places in the Scottish Borders
