= Cook (surname) =

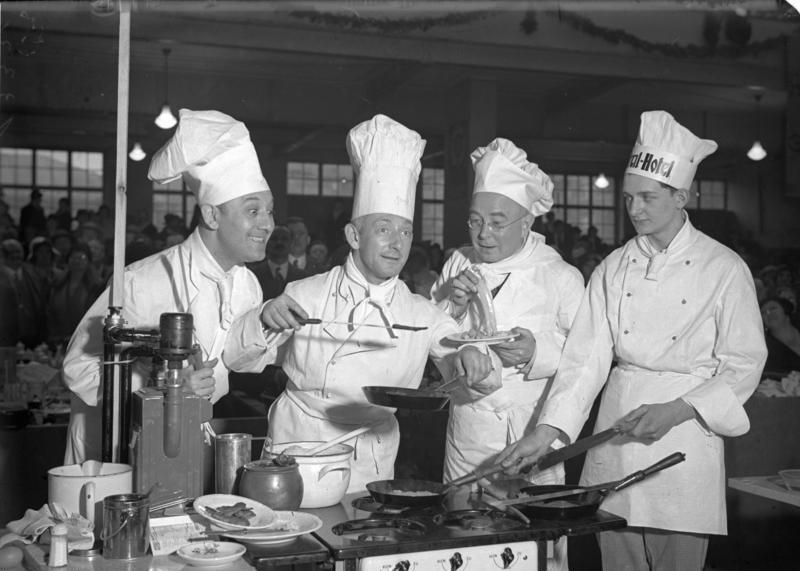
- Cooks

Origin
- Language: Old English
- Meaning: Cook (domestic worker)

Other names
- Variant forms: Koch, Kok, Cooke, Cooker, Cock, Cocks, and Cox, Cuoco, Kuharić, Kuvarić

Cook is an occupational surname of English origin. Notable people with the surname include:

== A ==
- Aaron Cook (disambiguation), multiple people
- Abby Cook (ice hockey) (born 1998), Canadian ice hockey player
- Adam Cook (disambiguation), multiple people
- A. J. Cook (born 1978), Canadian actress
- A. J. Cook (trade unionist) (1883–1931), Welsh trade unionist
- Alan Cook (disambiguation) or Allan, multiple people
- Alana Cook (born 1997), American soccer player
- Alastair Cook (born 1984), English cricketer
- Albert Cook (disambiguation), multiple people
- Alex Cook (disambiguation), multiple people
- Alfred Cook (Wisconsin politician), American politician
- Ali Cook, English magician and actor
- Alice Cook (disambiguation), multiple people
- Alicia Augello Cook also known as Alicia Keys, American singer
- Alistair Cook (disambiguation), multiple people
- Allen Cook, American politician
- Allison Cook (disambiguation), multiple people
- Alyssa-Jane Cook (born 1967), Australian actress, singer and television presenter
- Amanda Lindsey Cook (born 1984), Canadian singer
- Amy Cook (born 1979), American musician and singer-songwriter
- Anne Cook (disambiguation), or Ann, multiple people
- Annelies Cook (born 1984), American biathlete
- Anthony Cook (disambiguation), multiple people
- Arnold Cook (1922–1981), Australian academic and national guide dog pioneer
- Arthur Cook (disambiguation) multiple people
- Austin Cook (born 1991), American golfer

== B ==
- Barbara Cook (1927–2017), American singer and actress
- Barrie Cook (1929–2020), English artist
- Barry Cook, American film director
- Beano Cook (1931–2012), American sportscaster
- Bekki Cook (born 1950), American politician
- Benjamin Cook (disambiguation), multiple people
- Bert Cook (disambiguation), multiple people
- Beryl Cook (1926–2008), English painter
- Betsy Cook, American musician
- Bill Cook or Billy Cook see William Cook (disambiguation)
- Blaine Cook (singer), American singer
- Blaine Cook (programmer) (born 1980), Canadian software engineer
- Bob Cook (ice hockey) (1948–1978), Canadian ice hockey player
- Bobby Cook (disambiguation), several people
- Boo Cook (born 1972), British comic artist
- Brian Cook (disambiguation), multiple people
- Bruce Cook (disambiguation), several people
- Bun Cook, Canadian professional ice hockey forward
- Byron Cook (disambiguation), several people

== C ==
- Carole Cook (1924–2023), American actress
- Carl Cook (born 1962), American businessman
- Catherine Cook (disambiguation), multiple people
- Charles Cook (disambiguation), multiple people
- Chelsea Cook, American politician and lawyer
- Chris Cook (disambiguation), multiple people
- Christine Cook (born 1970), English field hockey player
- Clara Cook (1921–1996), American baseball player
- Clarence Chatham Cook (1828–1900), American author and art critic
- Clay Cook (born 1978), American songwriter, producer and musician

== D ==
- Daequan Cook (born 1987), American player with Israeli Basketball Premier League
- Dale Cook (born 1958), American kickboxer
- Dalvin Cook (born 1995), American football player
- Daniel Cook (disambiguation), multiple people
- Damien Cook (born 1991), Australian Rugby League player
- Dane Cook (born 1972), American comedian
- David Cook (disambiguation), multiple people
- Dean Cook (born 1985), British actor
- Dennis Cook (born 1962), American professional baseball pitcher
- Dianne Cook (disambiguation), multiple people
- Dick Cook, American Chairman of Disney Studios
- Doc Cook (Charles L. Cooke, 1891–1958), American jazz bandleader
- Doc Cook (baseball) (Luther Almus Cook, 1886–1973), American baseball player
- Don Cook (born 1949), American record producer and songwriter, mainly in the field of country music
- Donald Cook (disambiguation), multiple people
- Donna Cook (1926–2006), All-American Girls Professional Baseball League player
- Doris Cook (born 1931), All-American Girls Professional Baseball League player
- Dorothy Cook, All-American Girls Professional Baseball League player
- Dylan Cook (born 1998), American football player

== E ==
- Edith Agnes Cook (1859–1942), first female student at Adelaide University, principal of the Advanced School for Girls
- Eli Cook (1814–1865), American politician
- Eli Cook (musician) (born 1986), American singer, songwriter, guitarist and record producer
- Elisha Cook Jr. (1903–1995), American actor
- Elizabeth Cook (disambiguation), multiple people
- Elsie Cook, Secretary for the Scottish Women's Football Association
- Everett Richard Cook (1894–1974), American World War I flying ace

== F ==
- Fielder Cook (1923–2003), American television and film director, producer and writer
- Francis Cook (disambiguation), multiple people
- Frank Cook (disambiguation), multiple people
- Fred Cook (disambiguation), multiple people
- Frederick Cook (disambiguation), multiple people

== G ==
- Garry Cook (sprinter) (born 1958), British athlete
- Garry Cook (executive), British football executive, currently with Manchester City
- George Cook (disambiguation), multiple people
- Geoff Cook (born 1951), England cricketer
- Geoffrey Cook (disambiguation), multiple people
- Glen Cook (born 1944), author
- Glen Cook (baseball), American baseball player
- Glenn Cook, British triathlete and coach
- Greg Cook (disambiguation), multiple people

== H ==
- Harry Cook (disambiguation), multiple people
- Harvey Weir Cook (1892–1943), American aviator
- Henry Cook (disambiguation), multiple people
- Herman Cook, known as Junior Cook (1934–1992), hard bop tenor saxophone player
- Hugh Cook (Canadian novelist) (born 1942), Canadian writer
- Hugh Cook (science fiction author) (1956–2008), English-born novelist
- Hugo Cook (born 2004), British racing driver
- Hume Cook, James Hume Cook, Australian politician

== I ==
- Ian Cook (disambiguation), multiple people
- Ira Cook (1821–1902), American surveyor, mayor, banker, tax collector, city council member, investor and entrepreneur

== J ==
- James Cook (disambiguation), multiple people
- Jamie Cook, guitarist with British band the Arctic Monkeys
- Jamie Cook (footballer), English footballer
- Jane Constance Cook (Ga’axstal’as) (1870–1951), Canadian first nations leader and activist
- Jane Hampton Cook, American historian
- Jesse Cook, Canadian guitarist
- Jeffrey Cook (disambiguation), multiple people
- Jill Cook, British curator
- Jim Cook see James Cook (disambiguation)
- Jimmy Cook, South African cricketer
- Joan Cook (born 1934), Canadian Senator for Newfoundland and Labrador
- Joan Riddell Cook, founding director of JAWS (Journalism and Women Symposium)
- Joel Cook (1842–1910), American politician from Pennsylvania
- John Cook (disambiguation), multiple people
- Johnny Cook (disambiguation), multiple people
- Jonathan Cook (born 1965), British writer and journalist based in Israel
- Jonathan Cook (cricketer) (born 1989), Australian cricketer
- Jordan Cook (born 1990), English footballer
- Joseph Cook (disambiguation), multiple people
- Julian Cook (1916–2017), US Army officer
- Julian Abele Cook Jr. (1930–2017), US District Court judge
- Junior Cook (1934–1992), Herman Cook, American hard bop tenor saxophone player
- Justin Cook (born 1982), American voice actor

== K ==
- Kara Cook (born 1985), Australian politician
- Katherine M. Cook (1876–1962), American educator and government official
- Kathy Smallwood-Cook (born 1960), British sprint athlete
- Keandre Cook (born 1997), basketball player in the Israeli Basketball Premier League
- Kenneth Bernard Cook (1929–1987), Australian journalist and novelist
- Kristy Lee Cook (born 1984), American singer and television personality

== L ==
- Lawrence Cook (disambiguation), multiple people
- Lee Cook (born 1982), English footballer
- Lemuel Cook (1759–1866), American Revolutionary War veteran
- Leonard Cook (1912–1991), Australian boxer at the 1936 Olympics
- Lester Cook (born 1984), American tennis player
- Lewis Cook (disambiguation), multiple people
- Linda Cook (1962–1986), English murder victim
- Lloyd Cook (1890–1964), Canadian ice hockey defenceman
- Louis Cook (d. 1814), Iroquois leader
- Louise Cook (rally driver) (born 1987), British rally driver

== M ==
- Makira Cook (born 2001), American basketball player
- Mariana Cook (born 1955), American photographer
- Marlow Cook (1926–2016), Republican US Senator from Kentucky
- Marv Cook (born 1966), American football player
- Mary Cook (disambiguation), multiple people
- Matthew Cook (disambiguation), multiple people
- Merrill Cook (born 1946), Republican member of the US House of Representatives from Utah
- Michael Cook (disambiguation), multiple people
- Myke Cook (born 1989), Australian football player
- Mindy Cook (born 1988), American goalball player
- Mitch Cook (born 1961), English football player
- Moxon Cook (1857–1917), Australian sports journalist
- Murray Cook (born 1960), Australian musician
- Murray Cook (baseball) (born 1940), Canadian baseball scout and executive
- Myron Cook (born 1961/62), American geologist and YouTuber

== N ==
- Nat Cook, Australian politician
- Natalie Cook (born 1975), Australian beach volleyball player
- Nathaniel Cook (19th century), English designer of the standard set of chess figures
- Nicholas Cook (born 1950), British musicologist
- Nick Cook (disambiguation), multiple people
- Nicky Cook, English boxer
- Noble David Cook (1941–2024), author and historian of colonial Peru
- Norm Cook, American basketball player
- Norman Cook (born 1963), British musician (aka Fatboy Slim)

== O ==
- Octavia Cook (born 1978), New Zealand jeweller
- Olive Cook (1912–2002), British writer and artist
- Oliver Cook (born 1990), British rower
- Omar Cook (born 1982), American-born, naturalized Montenegrin professional basketball player
- Orator F. Cook (1867–1949), American botanist, entomologist, and agronomist
- Orchard Cook (1763–1819), U.S. Representative from Massachusetts
- Orval R. Cook (1898–1980), United States Air Force four-star general
- Oscar Cook (1888–1952), British author of novels, non-fiction works and short stories with a supernatural theme
- Óscar Alvarado Cook (born 1944), Mexican politician from the Institutional Revolutionary Party
- Otis Cook (1900–1980), American painter born in New Bedford, Massachusetts

== P ==
- Pam Cook (born 1943), English film theorist
- Pamela Cook, American mathematician
- Paul Cook (disambiguation) multiple people
- Paula Cook (born 1969), British auto racing driver
- Penny Cook (1957–2018), Australian actress
- Perry R. Cook (born 1955), American computer music researcher and professor at Princeton
- Peter Cook (disambiguation), multiple people

== Q ==
- Quentin L. Cook (born 1940), American lawyer, business executive, and religious leader in the LDS Church
- Quinn Cook (born 1993), American basketball player

== R ==
- R. James Cook (born 1937), American phytopathologist
- Rachael Leigh Cook (born 1979), American actress and model
- Ralph Cook (born 1944), Associate Justice of the Alabama Supreme Court
- Randall William Cook (born 1951), American visual effects artist
- Richard Cook (disambiguation) multiple people
- Rick Cook (architect) (born 1960), New York City architect
- Rick Cook (writer) (1944–2022), American author
- Robin Cook (disambiguation), multiple people
- Roderick Cook (1932–1990), English playwright, writer, director, and actor
- Rodney Mims Cook Jr. (born 1956), American businessman
- Rodney Mims Cook Sr. (1924–2013), American politician and activist
- Roger Cook (disambiguation), multiple people
- Ron Cook (born 1948), English actor
- Ron Cook (baseball) (born 1947), American baseball player
- Russ Cook (born 1997), English endurance athlete
- Ryan Cook (disambiguation), multiple people

== S ==
- Samuel Cook (disambiguation), multiple people
- Scott Cook (born 1952), American entrepreneur
- Scott Cook (soccer), American soccer player
- Sharon Anne Cook (born 1947), Canadian historian
- Sherburne F. Cook (1896–1974), American physiologist and pioneer in population studies
- Stephen Cook (disambiguation)
- Steve Cook (disambiguation), multiple people
- Stu Cook (born 1945), bassist with U.S. rock band Creedence Clearwater Revival
- Stuart W. Cook (1913–1993), American social psychologist

== T ==
- Ted Cook (disambiguation), multiple people
- Terry Cook (disambiguation), multiple people
- Theodore Cook (disambiguation), multiple people
- Thomas Cook (disambiguation), multiple people
- T. S. Cook (1947–2013), American screenwriter and producer
- Tim Cook (disambiguation), multiple people
- Troy Cook (born 1976), Australian footballer
- Tyler Cook (born 1997), American basketball player

== V ==
- Vernon Cook (1927–1987), member of the Ohio House of Representatives
- Victor Cook (born c. 1960/1961), American television director, writer, and producer
- Victoria Cook (1933–2019), World Champion archer who represented the United States
- Virgil Young Cook (1848–1922), American Confederate veteran and planter
- Vivian Cook (disambiguation), multiple people

== W ==
- Walter Cook (disambiguation), multiple people
- Wayne Cook (American football) (born 1971), American football player
- Wayne Cook (musician) (born 1946), American keyboardist
- Wequash Cook, also spelled Cooke, (d. 1642), Pequot leader
- Wesley Cook (born 1954), later known as Mumia Abu-Jamal, American convicted of the 1981 murder of a Philadelphia police officer
- Whitfield Cook (1909–2003), American writer
- Will Marion Cook (1869–1944), American composer and violinist
- William Cook (disambiguation), multiple people
- Willie Cook (1923–2000), American jazz trumpeter
- Willie Cook (footballer) (1903–1981), Scottish footballer
- W. T. Cook (1884–1970), American college sports coach

== Y ==
- Yassar Cook (born 1993), South African first-class cricketer
- Yvette Cook, known as "Lady E", member of Newcleus, American electro and old school hip hop group

== Z ==
- Zach Cook (b. 1999), Australian speedway rider
- Zachary Cook (fl. 2000s–2010s), American politician, Republican member of the New Mexico House of Representatives
- Zadock Cook (1769–1863), United States Representative from Georgia

== See also ==
- Cooke
- Cooks (surname)
- Kook (surname)
