= Richard Cook =

Richard Cook or Cooke may refer to:

== Artists ==
- Richard Cook (artist 1784–1857), English artist
- Richard Cook (journalist) (1957–2007), British jazz writer, magazine editor and former record company executive
- Richard Cook (painter born 1947), British painter
- Richard B. Cook (1838–1916), British author
- Richard Martin Oscar Cook (1888–1952), British author
- Richard P. Cook (born 1949), English artist

== Politicians ==
- Richard Cecil Cook (1902–1977), Australian judge
- Richard Cook, chairperson of the Unionist funding organisation Constitutional Research Council
- Richard Cook, candidate in the 2010 US House of Representatives elections in Mississippi for District 2
- Richard Cook, member of parliament for Coventry
- Richard Cooke (MP for Lymington) (1561–1616), English-born politician
- Richard Cooke (MP for Preston) (died 1579), English politician

== Other ==
- Dick Cook (Richard W. Cook), American film entertainment executive
- Richard Cook (safety researcher) (1953–2022), system safety researcher
- Richard E. Cook (1930–2024), general authority of the Church of Jesus Christ of Latter-day Saints
- Richard Cooke (archaeologist) (1946–2023), English archaeologist
- Richard J. Cook, American educator
- Richard Joseph Cooke (1853–1931), bishop of the Methodist Episcopal Church, South
- Richard M. Cook, American academic
- Richard W. Cook (1907–1992), American engineer
- Richard Cooke (footballer) (born 1965), English former footballer
- Rick Cook (architect) (born 1960), New York City architect
- Richard Cooke (rugby league), Australian rugby league player

== See also ==
- Cook (surname), an occupational surname of English origin
- Dick Cooke, former American college baseball coach
- Rick Cook (writer) (James Richard Cook; 1944–2022), American author
