= Francis Cook =

Francis or Frank Cook may refer to:

- Francis Cook, 1st Viscount of Monserrate (1817–1901), British textile trader
- Sir Francis Cook, 4th Baronet (1907–1978), British artist
- Frank Cook (American football) (fl. 1892), American football coach
- Frank Cook (American musician) (1942–2021), American drummer for the blues rock band Canned Heat
- Frank Cook (Australian footballer) (1916–1973), Australian rules footballer
- Frank Cook (Norwegian musician) (1924–1982), Norwegian jazz musician and band leader
- Frank Cook (politician) (1935–2012), British politician
- Frank Cook (surgeon) (1888–1972), obstetric and gynaecological surgeon
- Francis A. Cook (1843–1916), U.S. States Navy officer
- Frank C. Cook IV (1963–2009), American ethnobotanist, humanitarian and educator

== See also ==
- Francis Cooke (disambiguation)
- Frank Cooke (disambiguation)
- Frances Crook, chief executive of the Howard League for Penal Reform
- Cook (surname)
