= Chris Cook =

Chris or Christopher Cook may refer to:

== Entertainment ==
- Christopher Cook (artist) (born 1959), British painter
- Christopher Cook (composer) (born 1962), American composer
- Christopher Cook (American writer) (born 1952), American writer
- Christopher Cook (Canadian writer), playwright
- Christopher D. Cook (born 1988), British composer and conductor
- Christopher Matthew Cook, American actor

== Sports ==
- Chris Cook (cornerback) (born 1987), American football player
- Chris Cook (American football coach) (born 1981)
- Chris Cook (bodybuilder) (born 1976), American professional bodybuilder
- Chris Cook (racing driver) (born 1971), American racing driver and instructor
- Chris Cook (rugby union) (born 1991), English rugby union player
- Chris Cook (skier) (born 1980), American Olympic skier
- Chris Cook (swimmer) (born 1979), English swimmer

== Other people ==
- Chris Cook (sailor) (born 1974), Canadian sailor in the Finn class
- Sir Christopher Cook, 5th Baronet (born 1938)

== See also ==
- Christian Cook (born 1975), American lacrosse player
- Christian Cooke (born 1987), English television actor
- Christine Cook (born 1970), English field hockey player
