= James Neagle =

British engraver

James Neagle (1760?–1822) was a British engraver. Very largely a line engraver of book illustrations, he was prolific of designs by Thomas Stothard, Robert Smirke, Henry Fuseli, Gavin Hamilton, Henry Singleton, Richard Cook, and other popular artists.

== Life ==
Neagle went to the Royal Academy Schools in 1786. He had many commissions from the publishing firm of Cadell & Davies. In 1801, in a civil action brought by Jean Marie Delattre the engraver against John Singleton Copley, over a plate, Neagle was a witness for the plaintiff. Towards the end of his life (after 1816) he emigrated to America, where he died not long afterwards in 1822.

== Works ==
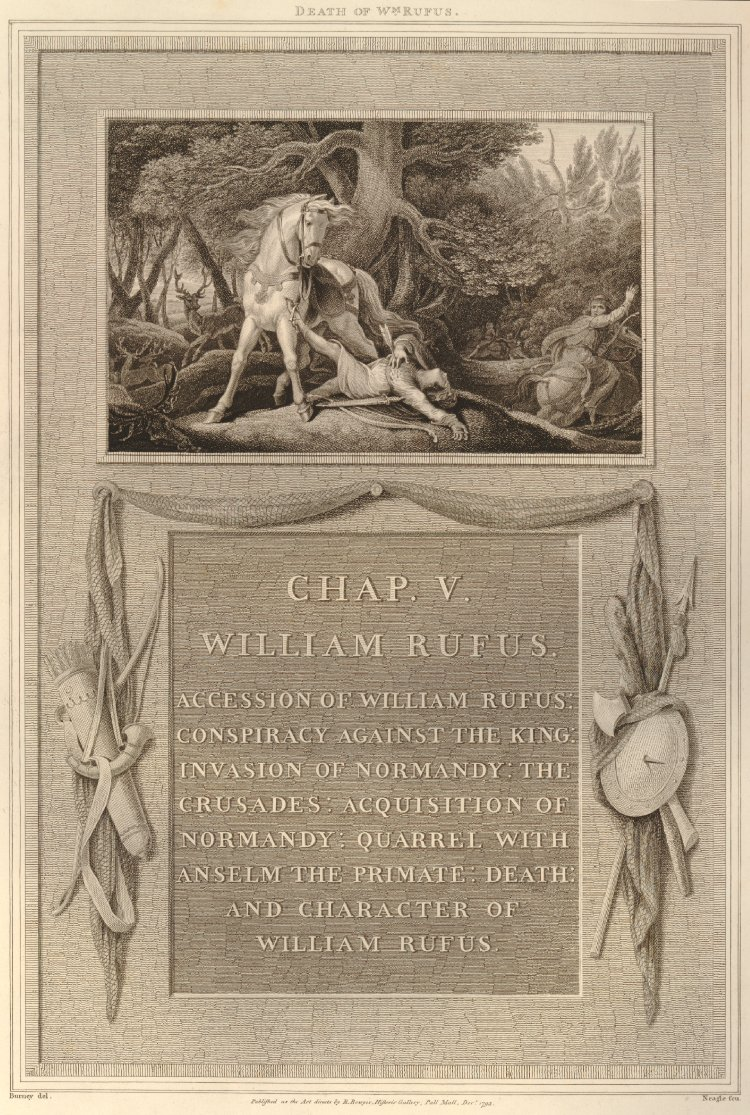
The death of William Rufus, engraving by James Neagle from Robert Bowyer's History of England

Neagle's work included plates for:

- John Boydell's and other editions of Shakespeare, including plates after Francis Wheatley;
- John Sharpe's and Charles Cooke's series of English Classics;
- Edward Forster's Arabian Nights, 1802;
- Gil Blas, 1809, translated by Benjamin Heath Malkin;
- Ancient Terra-Cottas in the British Museum, 1810, by Taylor Combe; and
- James Cavanah Murphy's Arabian Antiquities of Spain, 1816.

A major work was The Royal Procession in St. Paul's on St. George's Day, 1789, from a drawing by Edward Dayes.

== Family ==
Neagle had a son, John B. Neagle (died 1866), who practised as an engraver in Philadelphia.

== Notes ==
Attribution

This article incorporates text from a publication now in the public domain: Lee, Sidney, ed. (1894). "Neagle, James". Dictionary of National Biography. Vol. 40. London: Smith, Elder & Co.
