= Badatz =

Major Jewish rabbinical court

Badatz in Bnai Brak, Israel, lead by Haredi Rabbi Nissim Karelitz

A Badatz (Hebrew: בד״ץ plural batei din) is a major Jewish beth din (rabbinical court). The term is a modern one, and is an acronym for beit din tzedek ("court of Justice").

In Israel, the term Badatz is often used to refer to the Badatz of the Edah HaChareidis; however, it is not the title of this group, and other batei din use the title as well. It is often used in the context of hechsherim (kashrut certification).

In most Jewish communities, there has been a beit din, which was often headed by the rabbi of the city, hence the nickname "Rabbad" - combining "Rabbi" and "Av Beit Din." In various ultra-Orthodox communities today, there are three Jewish judges serving as a local badatz.

== Badatz in Israel ==
Badatz is not a major beth din according to the laws of the State of Israel. Certain Badatz, such as that of the ultra-Orthodox community, do not recognize the authority of the State of Israel, and the judgments are not legally valid but only halakhic.

== Rabbinical Courts ==
Rabbinical courts that use this title include:

- Badatz Edah HaChareidis from Jerusalem
- Badatz Igud Rabbonim of Rabbi Osher Yaakov Westheim
- Badatz Chassam Sofer from Bnei Brak, and Rabbis Shmuel Eliezer Stern and Yitzchok Shlomo Ungar
- Badatz Mehadrin of Rabbi Simcha HaKohen Kook and Rabbi Avraham Rubin
- Badatz Machzikei HaDas of Belz
- Badatz Beit Yosef of Rabbi Ovadia Yosef
- Badatz Agudas Yisroel
- Badatz Yoreh Deah of Rabbis Shlomo Machpoud and Ovadia Yosef
- Badatz Chug Chassam Sofer of Rabbi A. Wosner
- Badatz of the Hisachdus Kehilas Hayereim
- Badatz of Toronto of Rabbi Amram Assayag
- Badatz Rabbinical Court, based in Lakewood, New Jersey, with courtrooms around the U.S.
- Badatz Mekor Haim, based in Queens, New York, of Rabbi Eliyahu Ben Haim
