= Benjamin Cook =

Benjamin Cook or Cooke may refer to:

- Benjamin Cook (journalist) (born 1982), English journalist and Doctor Who author
- Benjamin Cook (scientist), American climate scientist
- Benjamin S. Cook, American nanotechnology scientist
- Benjamin F. Cook (1833–1915), American military officer and politician from Massachusetts
- Benjamin A. Cook (1867–1938), American politician from Massachusetts
- Benjamin Cooke (1734–1793), English composer, or his father an English publisher
- Ben Cook (actor) (born 1997), American actor, singer, and dancer
- Ben Cook (coach) (born 1963), American strength coach and author
- Ben Cook (speedway rider) (born 1997), Australian speedway rider
- Ben Cook (golfer) (born 1993), American golfer
- Ben Cooke (born 1974), British stuntman

== See also ==
- Bennie Cook, American politician from Missouri
