= James Cook (disambiguation) =

James Cook (1728–1779) was a British explorer, navigator, and map maker.

James Cook may also refer to:

== Musicians ==
- Jamie Cook (born 1985), English guitarist and member of indie rock band Arctic Monkeys
- James Cook, a member of the band Delphic

== Sportspeople ==
=== Association football ===
- James Cook (footballer, born 1885) (1885–1971), Scottish footballer
- Jim Cook (footballer, born 1904) (1904–?), English footballer (Grimsby Town)
- Jim Cook (footballer, born 1948), Scottish footballer (Kilmarnock FC, Dumbarton FC, Falkirk FC)
- Jamie Cook (footballer) (born 1979), English association football player

=== American football ===
- James Cook (American football, born 1888) (1888–1979), American football player; National Football League offensive guard
- James Cook (running back) (born 1999), American football player; National Football League running back

=== Other sportspeople ===
- James Cook (Australian footballer) (born 1974), former Australian Football League player
- James Cook (boxer) (1959–2025), Jamaican-born British boxer and community worker
- Jamie Cook (rower) (born 1992), English rower
- Jamie Cook (rugby league), New Zealand rugby league footballer
- James Cook (sailor) (born 1952), Australian Olympic sailor
- Jim Cook (baseball) (1879–1949), Major League Baseball player for the Chicago Cubs
- Jim Cook (racing driver) (1921–1983), stock car racer in the NASCAR Grand National Series

== Other people ==
- James Cook (American banker), American banker active in Russia
- James Cook (artist) (1904–1960), New Zealand-born Australian artist, curator and critic
- James Cook (broadcaster), Scottish journalist for the BBC
- James B. Cook (fl. 1851–1899), English-trained architect in Memphis, Tennessee
- James Dunbar Cook (1921–2007), British rear admiral
- James Hume Cook (1866–1942), Australian politician
- James M. Cook (1807–1868), New York State Comptroller, 1854–1855
- James Pringle Cook (born 1947), American painter
- James Wilfred Cook (1900–1975), English chemist, Vice-Chancellor of the University of Exeter (1954–1966)
- James William Cook (1820–1875), Canadian businessman and political figure
- R. James Cook (born 1937), American phytopathologist
- Jim Cook Jr. (born 1987), American writer
- James H. Cook, discoverer of a Miocene bone bed in Sioux County, Nebraska
- James Cook, murderer gibbeted in 1832

== Other uses ==
- James Cook (Skins), a character from Skins
- James Cook Boys Technology High School, Kogarah, Australia
- James Cook High School, South Auckland, New Zealand
- James Cook University, Queensland, Australia
- James Cook University Hospital, a teaching hospital in Marton, Middlesbrough, England
  - James Cook railway station, a station being built primarily to serve the hospital
- RRS James Cook, a 2005 British research ship
- Captain James Cook (miniseries), a 1989 Australian mini series

== See also ==
- James Cooke (disambiguation)
