= Roger Cooke =

Roger Cooke may refer to:

- Roger Gresham Cooke (1907–1970), British politician
- Roger Cooke (artist) (1941–2012), American artist and muralist
- Roger M. Cooke, mathematician, Senior Fellow Emeritus at Resources for the Future, prominent in the early development of vine copulas

== See also ==
- Roger Cook (disambiguation)
