= Harold Cook =

Harold Cook may refer to:

- Harold J. Cook (born 1952), historian of medicine
- Harold Lewis Cook, American poet
- H. Dale Cook (1924–2008), American federal judge

== See also ==
- Harold Cooke (1907–1986), British Olympic fencer
- Harry Cook (disambiguation)
