= Francis Engleheart =

English engraver

Francis Engleheart (1775–1849) was an English engraver.

== Life ==
Engleheart, born in London in 1775, was nephew of George Engleheart, and grandson of Francis Engleheart of Kew. He served as apprentice to Joseph Collyer the younger, and subsequently became assistant to James Heath. His first published engravings were some plates after the designs of Thomas Stothard, R.A., and he also engraved a large portion of The Canterbury Pilgrims, which was completed and published by Heath. He became better known to the public by his engravings from the pictures and drawings of Richard Cook, R.A., and some of these were considered among the finest specimens of book illustrations then produced in England.

He subsequently engraved the portraits in a collection of the works of the English poets, and was engaged by Cadell & Davies to engrave the designs of Robert Smirke R.A., for works published by them. Engleheart engraved nearly thirty of Smirke's designs for their edition of Don Quixote. His services were enlisted by Sir David Wilkie, R.A., to engrave his Duncan Gray and The only Daughter, which are the works by which Engleheart is chiefly known. His last important work was an engraving from the picture by William Hilton, R.A., of Serena rescued by Sir Calepine, the Red Cross Knight. Among other engravings by him were Cupid and the Nymphs, after Hilton, The Holy Family, after Fra Bartolommeo, some plates for The British Museum Marbles, and numerous portraits and plates for the annuals then in vogue. Engleheart was a member of the Society of British Artists, and occasionally contributed to their exhibitions.

He died on 15 February 1849, in his seventy-fourth year.
