= Frank Cooke =

Frank Cooke may refer to:

- Frank Cooke (engineer) (1913–2005), American entrepreneur, engineer and inventor
- Frank J. Cooke (1922–1996), mayor of Norwalk, Connecticut (1961–1965)
- Frank Cooke (broadcaster) (1923–2007), broadcaster and writer
- Frank Cooke (barrister) (1862–1933), New Zealand lawyer and cricketer

== See also ==
- Franklin Cooke Jr., American politician
- Francis Cooke (disambiguation)
- Frank Cook (disambiguation)
