= John Wey Ling =

- Born: Lin Jianwei; 1958 or 1959 (age 66–67); China
- Citizenship: United States
- Occupation: Ballet dancer

Chinese name
- Traditional Chinese: 林建偉
- Simplified Chinese: 林建伟
- Hanyu Pinyin: Lín Jiànwěi

John Wey Ling (林建伟; born c. 1958) is a Chinese-born American ballet dancer.

== Early career ==
Ling began his training at the Shanghai Ballet School. In 1977, he ranked as a Principal Dancer for the Shanghai Ballet. In 1980, he and his partner Wang Qifeng (汪齐风) participated in the International Ballet Competition in Japan, where they made history by winning the first gold medal in an international competition for China.

== Move to the United States ==
After participating in the 1982 USA International Ballet Competition in Jackson, Mississippi, Ling disappeared for two days, leaving behind his costume and clothing. By the time he turned up again, he had applied for US permanent residence on the basis of a job offer as a dancer. Some media reports characterized this as a defection, though Ling did not apply for political asylum.

Ling joined the American Ballet Theatre as a soloist under the direction of Mikhail Baryshnikov. While at ABT, Ling danced with Rudolph Nureyev, Joyce Cuoco, Carla Stallings and many more. Ling has appeared as a guest artist with the National Ballet of Canada, the Hong Kong Ballet, the Hong Kong Dance Company, the Fort Worth City Ballet, the Dallas Ballet, and the National Ballet of Mexico. He has danced the leading roles in all the major classical ballets. In addition, Ling has not only choreographed and staged the classics but has also given master classes around the world.

Ling founded his own school and company, Elite Ballet Theatre, in 2003 in Temple City, California. His school follows the Vaganova method under which he was trained in China. His younger daughter Alexandra also studies ballet, and participated in the 2014 USA International Ballet Competition.
