= Hugh Cook =

Hugh Cook may refer to:

- Hugh Cook (Canadian novelist) (born 1942), Canadian novelist
- Hugh Cook (science fiction author) (1956–2008), English-born, New Zealand-educated novelist, who formerly lived in Japan

== See also ==
- Hugh Cook Faringdon (died 1539), Benedictine monk
