= James Cooke =

James Cooke may refer to:

- James J. Cooke (1939–2016), American historian, author, academic and soldier
- James W. Cooke (1812–1869), American naval officer
- James Cooke (pentathlete) (born 1991), British modern pentathlete
- James Cooke (sailor) (born 1935), Singaporean Olympic sailor
- James Francis Cooke (1875–1960), American pianist, composer and writer
- James Douglas Cooke (1879–1949), British Member of Parliament for Hammersmith South
- James "Curley" Cooke (1967–2011), former guitarist for the Steve Miller Band
- Jimmy Cooke, American Negro league baseball player in 1932

== See also ==
- James Cooke Brown (1921–2000), sociologist and science fiction writer
- James Cook (disambiguation)
