= Alan Cook =

Alan or Allan Cook or Cooke may refer to:

- Sir Alan Cook (physicist) (1922–2004), British physicist
- Allan Cook (footballer) (born 1941), Australian rules footballer who played with Geelong
- Allan Cook (cricketer) (1924–1989), New Zealand cricketer
- Alan Cook (footballer) (born 1992), Scottish footballer
- Allan Cooke (1930–2010), Australian rules footballer who played with Richmond
- Alan Cooke (table tennis) (born 1966), English table tennis international
- Alan Cooke (politician), Irish politician and judge

== See also ==
- Alan Cooke Kay (1932–2024), American lawyer and judge
