= Elizabeth Cook (disambiguation) =

Elizabeth Cook (born 1972) is an American musician.

Elizabeth or Eliza Co(o)k(e) may also refer to:

- Elizabeth Batts Cook (1742–1835), the wife and widow of Captain James Cook
- Elizabeth Coke (pronounced Cook; 1578–1646), English courtier
- Elizabeth Cooke, Lady Russell (1528–1609), English noblewoman
- Elizabeth Cooke (silversmith), English silversmith
- Eliza Cook (1818–1889), English writer
- Eliza Cook (physician) (1856–1947), American physician

== See also ==
- Betty Cook (1923–1990), American rower
- Betty Cooke (1924–2024), American designer
- Elizabeth Cook-Lynn (1930–2023), Native American writer
- Elizabeth Cook Primary School, Ingleside Independent School District
- Elizabeth Cook, ship operated by Captain Cook Cruises, Australia
