= Lewis Cook =

Lewis Cook may refer to:

- Lewis Cook (American football coach), American football coach and player
- Lewis Cook (footballer, born 1997), English footballer (Bournemouth AFC)
- Lewis Cook (footballer, born 1983), English footballer (Wycombe Wanderers, AFC Wimbledon)
- Lewis Cook (Canadian football) (born 1946), a former Canadian football player
- Lewis H. Cook (1876–1934), American farmer and politician
