= Larry Cook =

Larry Cook may refer to:

- Larry Cook (artist), American conceptual, video, and photo artist
- Larry the Cook, a character in Seinfeld
- Larry Cook, a character in A Thousand Acres
- Larry Cook, actor in Trouble Man
- Larry Cook, anti-vaccination activist and founder of Stop Mandatory Vaccination

== See also ==
- Lawrence Cook (disambiguation)
