= Daniel Cook =

Daniel Cook may refer to:

- Daniel Cook (gymnast), British acrobatic gymnast
- Daniel Cook (musician) (born 1979), English organist, conductor and singer
- Daniel Pope Cook (1794–1827), American politician, lawyer and newspaper publisher from Illinois
- Dan Cook (1926–2008), American sports writer
- Daniel J. Cook, American professor of philosophy
- Daniel Cook (EastEnders), a character on EastEnders

== See also ==
- This is Daniel Cook, a children's television series
