= Thomas Hartwell Horne =

English theologian and librarian (1780–1862)

- Born: 20 October 1780; London
- Died: January 27, 1862 (aged 81)
- Occupations: Theologian and librarian
- Notable work: Introduction to the Study of Bibliography, Introduction to the Critical Study and Knowledge of the Holy Scriptures

Thomas Hartwell Horne (20 October 1780 – 27 January 1862) was an English theologian and librarian.

== Life ==
He was born in London and educated at Christ's Hospital until he was 15 when his father died and he had to work. He then became a clerk to a barrister, and used his spare time to write.

Horne was initially affiliated with the Wesleyans but later joined the Church of England. He was admitted to holy orders without the usual preliminaries, because of his published work. In 1833 he obtained a benefice in London and a prebend in St Paul's Cathedral.

Horne was a librarian in 1814 at the Surrey Institution, which was dissolved in 1823. He was admitted sizar to St John's College, Cambridge in 1819. In 1824 he joined the staff at the British Museum and was senior assistant in the printed books department there until 1860. He prepared a new system for cataloguing books at the museum but it was never used there. He did use it, however, to reclassify the extensive library of Frances Mary Richardson Currer in 1833.

== Works ==
Horne wrote more than forty works in bibliography, Bible commentaries, and Christian apologetics. One of his best known works is the three-volume Introduction to the Critical Study and Knowledge of the Holy Scriptures that was published in 1818. This work enjoyed widespread circulation in Britain and North America and went through at least eleven editions during the nineteenth century. It was reissued in North America in 1970. Horne also produced a "Tree Full of Bible Lore," a tree-shaped text of statistics on the Bible, in which he counted the number of books, chapters, verses, words, and even letters. He ended this tree with "It [the Bible] contains knowledge, wisdom, holiness and love." (This "tree" is reproduced in the third series of Ripley's paperbacks, originally published hardbound in 1949.)

He wrote an Introduction to the Study of Bibliography (1814), and various other works. Over a period of four years he catalogued the Harleian manuscripts then held at the British Museum.

== Biographical source ==
- Clark, R. E. D., "Thomas Hartwell Horne," in The New International Dictionary of the Christian Church, edited by J. D. Douglas. (Exeter: Paternoster Press, 1978). ISBN 0-85364-221-4

== Select bibliography ==
- A compendium of the statute laws, and regulations of the Court of admiralty: relative to ships of war, privateers, prizes, recaptures, and prize-money. With an appendix of notes, precedents, &c, (London: Printed for W. Clarke and sons, 1803)
- A Catalogue of the Harleian Manuscripts in the British Museum, 4 vols. (London: G. Eyre and J. Strahan, 1808-1812).
- An introduction to the study of bibliography: to which is prefixed A memoir on the public libraries of the antients, Volume 2, (London: T. Cadell and W. Davies, 1814)
- The History of the Mahometan Empire in Spain: Containing a General History of the Arabs, Their Institutions, Conquests, Literature, Arts, Sciences, and Manners, to the Expulsion of the Moors. Designed as an Introduction to the Arabian Antiquities of Spain, (London: T. Cadell and W. Davies, 1816). Supplementary to Arabian Antiquities of Spain (1813) by James Cavanah Murphy, which Horne edited as well as supplying text.
- The Campaign of Waterloo (London: T. Bensley, 1816).
- Introduction to the Critical Study and Knowledge of the Holy Scriptures, reprint of the 8th edition (Grand Rapids: Baker Book House, 1970). ISBN 0-8010-4003-5 Tenth EditionVolume 1 Volume 2Volume 3Volume 4Volume 4
- Introduction to the Critical Study of Bibliography, 5 Vol. (London: T. Cadell and W. Davies, 1814).
- A summary of biblical geography and antiquities,, (London: Printed For T. Cadell In The Strand, 1821)
- Outlines for the classification of a library: respectfully submitted to the consideration of the trustees of the British museum : official copy for the use of the trustees (not published)., (London: printed by G. Woodfall, 1825)
- A Compendious Introduction to the Study of the Bible: Illustrated with Maps and Other Engravings : Being an Analysis of "An Introduction to the Critical Knowledge of the Holy Scriptures" in 4 Volumes by the Same Author, (London: Printed For Thomas Cadell, 1827)
- A Catalogue of the Library of the College of St. Margaret Ad St. Bernard, Commonly Called Queen's College, Volume 2, Issue 1, (London: S. and R. Bentley, 1827)
- Manual of Biblical Bibliography, (Mansfield Center, Connecticut: Martino Publishers, 2005). ISBN 1-57898-562-5
- An Essay on the History of Liturgies, (London: W. Clowes, 1831).
- The Complete Grazier, (London: Baldwin and Cradock, 1833).
- A concise history and analysis of the Athanasian creed, (London: T. Cadell, 1834)
- A Protestant memorial, for the commemoration, on the fourth day of October, MDCCCXXXV., of the third centenary of the Reformation, and of the publication of the first entire Protestant English version of the Bible, Oct. IV.MDXXXV, (London: T. Cadell, 1835)

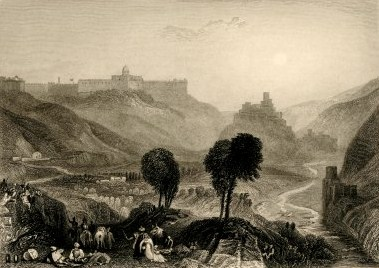
Mount Moriah, illustration from The Biblical Keepsake, engraving after J. M. W. Turner

- The Biblical Keepsake, Or, Landscape Illustrations of the Most Remarkable Places Mentioned in the Holy Scriptures, (London: J. Murray, 1835)
- Landscape illustrations of the Bible: consisting of views of the most remarkable places mentioned in the Old and New Testaments : from original sketches taken on the spot engraved by W. and E. Finden, Volume 1, (London: J. Murray, 1836)
- Introduction to the Critical Study and Knowledge of the Holy Scriptures, Volume 5. (London, 1846).
- Horae homileticae: or, Discourses digested into one continued series and forming a commentary upon every book of the Old and New Testament : to which is annexed, an improved edition of a translation of Claude's Essay on the composition of a sermon, Volume 4 , (London: J. Murray, 1836)
- A Manual of Biblical Bibliography: Comprising a Catalogue, Methodically Arranged, of the Principal Editions and Versions of the Holy Scriptures, Together with Notices of the Principal Philologers, Critics, and Interpreters of the Bible, (London: T. Cadell, 1839)
- Popery, the Enemy and Falsifier of Scripture
- Romanism Contrary to the Bible
- A Manual For the Afflicted
