= Frank Cook (surgeon) =

Frank Cook FRCS FRCOG
- Born: 6 November 1888
- Died: 25 February 1972 (aged 83)
- Education: Bedford Modern School; Guy's Hospital Medical School, University of London
- Occupation: Surgeon

Frank Cook FRCS FRCOG (6 November 1888 – 25 February 1972) was a Beit Memorial Research Fellow, an eminent obstetric and gynaecological surgeon at Guy's Hospital, Hunterian Professor of the Royal College of Surgeons in London (1917 and 1924), consulting surgeon at the Chelsea Hospital for Women and a Freeman of the Worshipful Society of Apothecaries.

== Early life and education ==
Frank Cook was born on 6 November 1888, the only son of Frank Plant Cook of Mansfield Woodhouse, Nottinghamshire.

He was educated at Bedford Modern School and Guy's Hospital Medical School, University of London (now part of King's College) having won a scholarship and research studentship in Physiology where he obtained first class honours and became a Beit Memorial Research Fellow. As a Beit Fellow he worked with Marcus Seymour Pembrey FRS to produce an important paper on the effects of muscular exercise on man. He was also one of the students with whom Sir Arthur Frederick Hurst made his pioneering investigations into the movements of the gut in man.

== Career ==
Cook was dean of the Institute of Obstetrics and Gynæcology and an examiner in obstetrics and gynæcology to the Universities of Cambridge, London, Glasgow and Bombay, and to the Royal College of Obstetricians and Gynæcologists.

Cook was a member of the boards of the SW Metropolitan Regional Hospital Board, St Thomas' Hospital and Chelsea Hospital for Women. He served as a colonel in the Royal Army Medical Corps in both Great Wars; France, Belgium and Mesopotamia (1914 Star with Bar); Palestine, Greece, Sudan, Egypt and India.

He was Hunterian Professor at the Royal College of Surgeons (1917 and 1924), consulting gynæcologist to Queen Alexandra Military Hospital and to King Edward VII Sanatorium, near Midhurst. He was a medical inspector of the High Court (Divorce Division) and a Demonstrator of Pathology, Surgical Registrar and tutor at Guy's Hospital.

== Personal life and death ==
In 1917 Cook married Edith Harriette Wallace, youngest daughter of the late Rev. James Reid of County Clare, Ireland. They had one son.

Cook died on 25 February 1972.
