= Henry Cooke =

Henry Cooke may refer to:

- Henry Cooke (composer) (c. 1616–1672), English composer
- Henry Cooke (artist) (1642–1700), British painter
- Henry Cooke (minister) (1788–1868), Irish presbyterian leader
- Henry D. Cooke (1825–1881), first territorial governor of the District of Columbia
- Henry D. Cooke (admiral) (1879–1958), rear admiral and grandson of Henry D. Cooke
- Henry Cooke (Australian politician) (1840–1903), Australian politician
- Henry Frederick Cooke (1784–1837), British soldier
- Sir Henry Cooke, 2nd Baronet (1633–c. 1689), English landowner

== See also ==
- Henry Cook (disambiguation)
