= Geoffrey Cook =

Geoff(rey) Cook may refer to:

- Geoffrey Cooke (cricketer) (1897–1980), English first-class cricketer and British Army officer
- Geoff Cook (born 1951), cricketer
- Geoff Cook (Australian cricketer) (1910–1982), Australian cricketer
- Geoffrey Cook (cricketer, born 1936)
- Geoff Cook (rugby league) from List of Parramatta Eels players

== See also ==
- Geoff Cooke (disambiguation)
- Jeffrey Cook (disambiguation)
