= Cuoco =

Cuoco (Italian: [ˈkwɔːko]) is a surname derived from the Italian word that means "cook".

People bearing the name include:

- Briana Cuoco, American singer and contestant in season 5 of The Voice
- Candice Cuoco (1988), American fashion designer
- Francisco Cuoco (1933–2025), Brazilian actor
- Joyce Cuoco, former American ballerina
- Kaley Cuoco (born 1985), American actress (who, most notably, appears in The Big Bang Theory)
- Vincenzo Cuoco (1770–1823), Italian writer
