= Christine Campbell Thomson =

British writer

Christine Mary Campbell Thomson (31 May 1897 – 29 September 1985), later Christine Hartley, was an English horror fiction author best known for the Not at Night series. She also wrote under the name Flavia Richardson.

== Early life ==
Christine Mary Campbell Thomson was born in Marylebone, London and grew up on Queen Anne Street, the daughter of Herbert Campbell Thomson and Constance Emily Temple Thomson. She attended Queen's College, London.

== As editor ==
Although an author in her own right, Thomson is best remembered in the fantasy field for her series of horror anthologies published in the 1920s and 1930s. The first, Not at Night (Selwyn and Blount, 1925), lent its name to the whole series, which ran eleven volumes, finishing with Nightmare by Daylight (1935) and The "Not at Night" Omnibus (1937). In all, there were 170 stories and, according to noted fantasy bibliographer Mike Ashley, exactly 100 of these came from the legendary American pulp Weird Tales. The anthologies initially selected material primarily from that magazine and gave first hardcover publication, as well as first British publication, to such authors of as H. P. Lovecraft and Robert E. Howard. The books in the series were all published by Selwyn & Blount. Mike Ashley has written: "although anthologies have perhaps earned a reputation greater than they deserve, they were nevertheless a landmark series in the history of horror short fiction".

== As author ==
Christine Campbell Thomson sold two stories in the 1920s as Flavia Richardson to Hutchinson's Mystery Story Magazine – "Out of the Earth" (Jan 1925) and "When Hell Laughed" (Jan 1926). She contributed two of her own stories to Weird Tales, also under the alias "Flavia Richardson". Her story, "The Red Turret" (first published in her own anthology Switch on the Light, 1931), was reprinted in the anonymously edited bumper anthology "A Century of Creepy Stories" (Hutchinson, 1934).

For most of her life, Thomson worked as a literary agent serving as director of the firm Thomson and McLaughlin. She wrote a number of novels (none of them in the horror field) as well as a guide to writing in The Right Way to Write Successful Fiction. Thomson's own short horror tale "Message for Margie" (the only one which appears to have been published under her own name) appeared in such anthologies as The Fifth Pan Book of Horror Stories (1964, ed. Herbert van Thal); Terrors, Torments and Traumas (ed. Helen Hoke, 1978) and "Realms of Darkness" (ed Mary Danby, 1985). A number of her stories that appeared in the Not at Night series as written by Flavia Richardson were also reprinted in various other anthologies by editors such as Charles Birkin, Mary Danby, and Herbert van Thal.

An occultist, and friend of Dion Fortune, she was a member of the Society of the Inner Light and wrote her two non-fiction occult titles, The Western Mystery Tradition (1968) and A Case For Reincarnation (1972) as Christine Hartley, using her the surname of her second husband, whom she had married in 1945. Her occult interests also manifested in her membership of The International Order of Freemasonry for Men and Women, LE DROIT HUMAIN, where she was an early Master of the ancient Egyptian themed lodge Maa-Kheru no. 975.

Campbell would later publish her autobiography I Am A Literary Agent (Sampson Low, 1951).

== Family ==
She was married to the editor and author Oscar Cook, who also appeared in Weird Tales, most notably with "Si Urag of the Tail". Thomson and Cook divorced in 1938.

== Death ==
Christine Campbell Thomson died, aged 88, on 29 September 1985. Six weeks later, Charles Birkin, who was ten years younger than her, died on 8 November.

== Not at Night series ==
- 1. Not at Night (October 1925; reprint, 1936). Not to be confused with the Herbert Asbury collection of the same title (see below) which is a limited selection (to 1928) from the British series; nor with the title published by Arrow Books (see below) which is also a selection from the series.
- 2. More Not at Night (Sept. 1926). Not to be confused with the title published by Arrow Books (see below) which is a selection from the series.
- 3. You'll Need A Night Light (Sept. 1927) Contains "Out of the Earth" by Flavia Richardson.
- 4. Gruesome Cargoes (July 1928) Contains "When Hell Laughed" by Flavia Richardson.
- 5. By Daylight Only (Oct. 1929)[not be confused with the title Only By Daylight which is a pbk reissue of the Arrow compilation Still Not at Night – see below]. Contains "At Number Eleven" by Flavia Richardson (orig. published Weird Tales Oct. 1929 as "The Gray Lady")
- 6. Switch on the Light (April 1931) Contains "The Red Turret" by Flavia Richardson.
- 7. At Dead of Night (Nov 1931) Contains "Pussy" by Flavia Richardson.
- 8. Grim Death (Aug 1932). Contains "Behinds the Blinds" by Flavia Richardson.
- 9. Keep on the Light (July 1933) Contains "The Black Hare" by Flavia Richardson.
- 10. Terror By Night (Aug. 1934). Contains "Behind the Yellow Door" by Flavia Richardson.
- 11.Nightmare By Daylight (April 1936) Contains "Empty Stockings" by Flavia Richardson.
- Not at Night Omnibus (April 1937) Contains "Behind the Yellow Door" by Flavia Richardson. 35 stories, selected from across the whole series of 11 volumes and representing the editor's favourite stories of the series.

== US pirate edition ==
Additionally, there was a US volume titled Not at Night: Creepy Tales! (ed. Herbert Asbury, NY: Macy-Macius, 1928). The story sources are, curiously, attributed to the English edition of Weird Tales; incorrect, as Thomson sourced her tales for the series from the original US editions of Weird Tales. Asbury's anthology was in fact in fact a pirate edition of a selection of 25 stories taken from the first four volumes of the British Not at Night series. For a time Weird Tales (from which most of the stories derived) threatened to sue the publisher, but the publisher eventually withdrew the book from circulation.

== Paperback editions ==
Arrow books published between 1960 and 1962 three paperbacks related to the series whose titles are rather misleading. They are in fact not reissues, but selections from the original series. Despite the titles of the first two selections being the same as those of the original Volumes 1 and 2, the contents are not identical to those original volumes.

- Not At Night (1960). Contains "Pussy" by Flavia Richardson.
- More Not At Night (1961, reprinted 1963; reissued 1973 as Never at Night). Contains "Out of the Earth" by Flavia Richardson.
- Still Not At Night (1962, reprinted 1963; reissued 1972 as Only By Daylight – a confusing title since it is similar to that of Vol 5 of the original anthology series By Daylight Only; however, this Arrow compilation has entirely different contents from Vol 5 of the original series).
