= Byron Cook =

Byron Cook may refer to:

- Byron Cook (computer scientist), computer science researcher
- Byron Cook (politician) (born 1954), Republican member of the Texas House of Representatives

== See also ==
- Cook (surname)
