= Joseph Cooke (disambiguation) =

Joseph Cooke (1775–1811) was the inspiration behind the Methodist Unitarian movement.

Joseph or Joe Cooke may also refer to:

- Joseph Platt Cooke (1730–1816), American military officer in the Revolutionary War and Connecticut politician
- Joseph Peter Cooke (1858–1913), lawyer and political figure in Quebec
- Joe Cooke (politician) (1904–1981), Australian Senator
- Joe Cooke (footballer) (born 1955), Dominican footballer
- Joe Cooke (basketball) (1948–2006), basketball player
- Joe Cooke (cricketer) (born 1997), English cricketer

== See also ==
- Joseph Cook (disambiguation)
