= Walter Cooke =

Walter Cooke may refer to:

- Walter E. Cooke (1910–1982), American politician from New York
- Walter H. Cooke (1838–1909), American soldier and Medal of Honor recipient
- Walter Cooke (footballer) (1876–1927), Australian rules footballer

== See also ==
- Walter Cook (disambiguation)
