= Matthew Cooke =

Matt Cooke (born 1978) is a Canadian ice hockey coach and former player.

Matthew or Matt Cooke may refer to:

- Matthew Cooke (entomologist) (1829–1887), American economic entomologist
- Matthew Cooke (fl. 1861), English Freemason and editor of the Matthew Cooke Manuscript
- Matthew Cooke (filmmaker) (born 1973), American film producer
- Matt Cooke (cyclist) (born 1979), American cyclist
- Matt Cooke (journalist) (born 1982), British broadcast journalist

== See also ==
- Matthew Cook (disambiguation)
