= Frederic Cook =

Frederic Cook may refer to:

- Frederic Charles Cook (1810–1889), English churchman and linguist
- Frederic W. Cook (1873–1951), American politician in Massachusetts

== See also ==
- Frederick Cook (disambiguation)
- Fred Cook (disambiguation)
