= Alice Cook =

Alice Cook may refer to:

- Alice Cook (figure skater) (born 1955), figure skater and sports reporter
- Alice Cook (peace activist) (1953–2023), Greenham Common Women's Peace Camp participant
- Alice Cook (professor) (1903–1998), activist and professor of labor history
- Alice Carter Cook (1868–1943), American botanist
- A. Grace Cook (Alice Grace Cook, 1877–1958), British astronomer
- Alice May Cook (1876–1960), British artist
- Alice Cook Fuller (1873–1956), née Cook, American writer and educator

== See also ==
- Alice Margaret Cooke (1867–1940), British historian and writer
- Alicia Cook, poet
- Alicia Keys, singer born by the name Alicia Cook
