= Kook (surname) =

- Language: Chinese (Cantonese), Dutch, Estonian, Korean

Origin
- Meaning: Chinese: "valley" (谷), "to bow" (鞠), "curved" (曲); Dutch: "cake baker", "cook"; Estonian: "cake"; Korean: "to bow" (鞠), "country" (國), "chrysanthemum flower" (菊

Other names
- Variant forms: Chinese: Gu (谷), Ju (鞠), Qu (曲); Dutch: Koek, Koeke, Kokke, Koeck, Koecke, Kocke, Koke, Coeck, Coecke, Coeke, Couck, Coucke, Couque, Coucq, Caucke; Korean: Kuk, Guk

Kook is a surname in various cultures.

== Origins ==
As a Chinese surname, Kook approximates the Cantonese pronunciations of various distinct surnames, listed below by their spelling in Hanyu Pinyin (which reflects the Standard Mandarin pronunciation):

- Gǔ (谷), meaning "valley" or "gorge" (Jyutping: Guk1; Cantonese Yale: Gūk)
- Jū (鞠), meaning "to bow" (Jyutping: Guk1; Cantonese Yale: Gūk)
- Qū (曲), meaning "curved" (Jyutping: Kuk1; Cantonese Yale: Kūk)

The Dutch surname Kook originated both as an occupational surname for a baker of cakes (koekenbakker) or a cook (kok), and as a variant spelling of the French surname Cocq ("rooster").

Kook is also a Jewish surname, a variant spelling of Kuk or Cook.

As a Korean surname, Kook is a customary spelling of the three surnames spelled Guk in the Revised Romanization of Korean: Gong Guk (鞠; 공 국; "to bow"), Nara Guk (國; 나라 국; "country"), and Gukhwa Guk (菊; 국화 국; "chrysanthemum flower").

== Statistics ==
In the Netherlands, there were 98 people with the surname Kook as of 2007.

The 2000 South Korean Census found 19,284 people with the family names spelled in Revised Romanization as Guk, comprising 16,697 people in 5,182 households for Gong Guk, 2,182 in 669 households for Nara Guk, and 405 people in 123 households for Gukhwa Guk. Bearers of this surname frequently do not use the Revised Romanization spelling; in a study based on year 2007 applications for South Korean passports, 38% of the applicants with this surname chose to spell it as Kook, and 48% used the Yale and McCune–Reischauer spelling Kuk, as compared to only 10% whose chose the spelling Guk.

The 2010 United States census found 522 people with the surname Kook, making it the 41,657th-most-common name in the country. This represented an increase from 484 (42,217th-most-common) in the 2000 Census. In both censuses, more than half of people with the surname Kook identified as non-Hispanic white, and about four-tenths as non-Hispanic Asian or Pacific Islander.

== People ==
- Abraham Isaac Kook (1865–1935), Chief Rabbi in the British Mandate of Palestine, considered to be Israel's first Ashkenazi Chief Rabbi
- Zvi Yehuda Kook (1891–1982), son of the above, prominent Religious Zionist rabbi
- Edward Kook (1903–1990), American stage lighting engineer
- Hillel Kook (1915–2001), nephew of Abraham Isaac Kook, prominent Revisionist Zionism activist during World War II
- Shannon Kook (born 1987), South African actor
- Gabie Kook (born 1988), South Korean YouTuber
- Kook Hae-seong (국해성; 鞠海成; born 1989), South Korean baseball outfielder

== See also ==
- Cook (disambiguation)
