= Donald Cook =

Donald or Don Cook may refer to:

- Donald Cook (Medal of Honor) (1934–1967), U.S. Marine and Vietnam War prisoner of war
  - USS Donald Cook, U.S. Navy destroyer named after the Medal of Honor recipient
- Donald Cook (actor) (1901–1961), American Broadway and film actor
- Donald C. Cook (1909–1981), American bureaucrat, chairman of American Electric Power
  - Donald C. Cook Nuclear Plant, power plant named after the bureaucrat and chairman of company
- Donald G. Cook (born 1946), U.S. Air Force general
- Donald Cook, father of Tim Cook and also a shipyard worker
- Don Cook (organist), organist and professor at Brigham Young University
- Don Cook (born 1949), American record producer and songwriter
- Don Cook (journalist) (1920–1995), American foreign correspondent
