= Geoff Cooke =

Geoff Cooke may refer to:

- Geoff Cooke (cyclist) (born 1944), British former national cycling coach
- Geoff Cooke (rugby union) (born 1941), England rugby coach

== See also ==
- Geoffrey Cook (disambiguation)
- Jeffrey Cook (disambiguation)
