= Henry Cook =

Henry or Harry Cook may refer to:

- Hank Cook (born Henry Cook, 1952), American former college football player
- Henry Caldwell Cook (1886–1939), British educator
- Henry Francis Cook (1855–?), American manufacturer and financier
- Henry Lucas Cook (died 1928), Archdeacon of Craven, 1913–1928
- Harry Cook (actor) (born 1991), Australian actor, writer and LGBTQ activist
- Henry Cook (aviator) (1863–1950), early British aviator and Royal Artillery officer
- Henry Cook (footballer) (1893–1917), English footballer
- Harry Cook (footballer) (1914–1987), Scottish footballer
- Harry Cook (martial artist) (Henry Wilson Cook, born 1949), British martial artist, teacher, and author

== See also ==
- Harold Cook (disambiguation)
- Henry Cooke (disambiguation)
