= Alicia Cook =

American poet, essayist and activist

Alicia Cook is a poet, essayist and activist. She is best known for writing bestselling book Stuff I've Been Feeling Lately and for spreading awareness on the impact of drug addiction.

== Education ==
Cook has a bachelor's degree in English Literature from Georgian Court University and an MBA from Saint Peter's University.

She was named Distinguished Alumni of the Year in 2020 by Georgian Court and was their commencement speaker in 2021.

== Career ==
Cook's writing often explores grief, addiction, healing, and mental health. Her poetry is characterized by "direct, unflinching honesty and rich compassion."

In 2016, Cook released poetry collection Stuff I've Been Feeling Lately. The book tackled life, death, love, trauma and growth. It is split into two parts, part A contains original poems while part B were remixes of poems found in part A. The book was a finalist for Goodreads Choice Awards.

Cook is also known for intersecting music and poetry.

She was the main subject in A Family Disease, an episode of the documentary series Here's the Story on PBS. The episode focused on her advocacy and the ten year anniversary of the death of her cousin.

Cook released The Other Side of Addiction in 2017. It is a collection of essays about drug addiction. The book informs and comforts people who are affected by addiction, especially the families of who witnessed their loved ones suffer in addiction.

In 2018, her second poetry book I Hope My Voice Doesn't Skip was released by Andrews McMeel Publishing.

In 2019, Cook went viral with the poem Sorry I haven't texted you back. She released a poetry book of the same name in October 2020. It was a semi-finalist in the Goodreads Choice Awards.

In 2022, Cook contributed an essay titled Why I Left to the anthology New Jersey Fan Club: Artists and Writers Celebrate the Garden State (Rutgers University Press 2022) about her complicated feelings on her hometown.

On January 9, 2024, Cook released the third and final book in her "mixtape" poetry series, entitled The Music Was Just Getting Good.

In 2025, Stuff I've Been Feeling Lately was adapted into an operatic song cycle by composer Evan Mack and premiered in Saratoga Springs, NY.

On January 22, 2026, she released More Stuff I've Been Feeling Lately, a poetry collection meant to celebrate the original book's 10th anniversary.

Cook's writing success and efforts to combat the opioid epidemic earned her recognitions. This includes a Women with Voices Award from the Women with Voices Foundation and a "special voices" award from NJPBS. She was also a "public health hero" finalist by NJBIZ. In 2023 she received a "40 under 40" award from The Irish Echo. She won the 2026 Central Avenue Poetry Prize for her poem "The Squirrel Made His Way."

== Bibliography ==
- Stuff I've Been Feeling Lately
- Heroin Is the Worst Thing to Ever Happen to Me: A Collection of Essays
- I Hope My Voice Doesn't Skip
- Sorry I Haven't Texted You Back
- New Jersey Fan Club: Artists and Writers Celebrate the Garden State
- The Music Was Just Getting Good
- The Enduring Spirit of Mercy at Georgian Court University: Stories of the Past to Shape Our Future
- More Stuff I've Been Feeling Lately
