= Lawrence Cook =

Lawrence Cook may refer to:

- Lawrence Cook (actor) (1930–2003), American actor
- Lawrence Cook (cricketer) (1884–1933), Lancashire cricketer and footballer
- J. Lawrence Cook (1899–1976), piano roll artist

== See also ==
- Larry Cook (disambiguation)
- Lawrence H. Cooke, American lawyer and politician from New York
