= Benjamin Cook (scientist) =

American climatologist

- Education: SUNY College of Environmental Science and Forestry (BA); University of Virginia (MS, PhD)
- Scientific career
- Fields: Earth and Environmental Sciences
- Workplaces: Columbia University

Benjamin I. Cook is an American climatologist with a number of publications to his name. Along with the Lamont–Doherty Earth Observatory, for instance, he used paleorecords to reconstruct land cover in Mexico’s Yucatán and other Central American regions.

== Notes ==
- Weather History Offers Insight Into Global Warming. The New York Times 15 Sep 2008. Last accessed 10 Dec 2011.
