= Adam Cook =

Adam Cook may refer to:

- Adam Cook (cricketer) (born 1979), former English cricketer
- Adam Cook (rugby league, born 2000), Australian rugby league footballer
- Adam Watene (1977–2008), known as Adam Cook early in his career, Cook Islander rugby league footballer
- Adam Cook, character in 1951 American film An American in Paris
