= Aaron Cook =

Aaron Cook may refer to:

- Aaron Cook (baseball) (born 1979), Major League Baseball pitcher
- Aaron Cook (footballer) (1979–2026), Welsh footballer
- Aaron Cook (politician), Nauruan politician
- Aaron Cook (taekwondo) (born 1991), British born Moldovan taekwondo athlete
- Aaron Cook Jr. (born 1997), American basketball player
- Aaron Cook, American rapper better known as Stove God Cooks
