= Bruce Cook =

Bruce Cook may refer to:

- Bruce Alexander Cook (1932–2003), American journalist and author who also wrote under the pseudonym Bruce Alexander
- Bruce Cook (actor), played the lead role in Thunderpants, a 2002 British-German family film
- Bruce Cook (cricketer) (1914–1981), Australian cricketer
