= Joseph Cook (disambiguation) =

Joseph Cook (1860–1947) was Prime Minister of Australia 1913–14.

Joseph or Joe Cook may also refer to:

- Joseph Louis Cook (died 1814), Mohawk chief
- Joseph H. Cook (1829–1921), merchant and political figure in Nova Scotia, Canada
- Josephus Flavius Cook or Joseph Cook (1838–1901), American philosophical lecturer, clergyman, and writer
- Joe Cook (actor) (1890–1959), American actor and comedian
- Joe Cook (basketball) (born 1985), American basketball coach

== See also ==
- Joseph Cooke (disambiguation)
