= Roger Cook =

Roger Cook may refer to:

- Roger Cook (graphic designer) (1930–2021), American artist
- Roger Cook (journalist) (1943–2026), New Zealand-British investigative journalist
- Roger Cook (landscaper) (1954–2024), American landscaper and television personality
- Roger Cook (politician) (born 1965), politician from Western Australia
- Roger Cook (songwriter) (born 1940), English singer, songwriter and record producer
- Roger Cook, British academic and artist; played Christ in Derek Jarman's film The Garden
- Roger Noel Cook (1946–2024), British comics writer, musician and magazine publisher

== See also ==
- Cook (surname)
