= Harold Lewis Cook =

American poet

Harold Lewis Cook was an American poet.

His work appeared in The Dial, Harper's, The Nation, The New Yorker, and Poetry.

Between the wars, he met Edna St. Vincent Millay and her mother at Zelli nightclub in Paris. His poem "In Time of Civil War" appeared in a pending war issue of The New Yorker, with Stephen Vincent Benét, and W. H. Auden.

== Works ==
- Spell against death, Harper & brothers, 1933
- Companioned thus, Quercus Press, 1937
