= Jane Hampton Cook =

American author and historian

Jane Hampton Cook is an American author and historian. In 2013, she wrote American Phoenix: John Quincy and Louisa Adams, the War of 1812, and the Exile that Saved American Independence. She published The Burning of the White House in 2016. She also wrote the children's history book What Does the President Look Like? (2011).

She previously served on the staff of United States President George W. Bush.
