= Theodore Cook =

Theodore Cook may refer to:

- Theodore Andrea Cook (1867–1928), British art critic and writer
- Ted Cook (American football) (1922–2006), U.S. football player

== See also ==
- Ted Cook (disambiguation)
- Ted Cooke-Yarborough (1918–2013), designer of the Harwell Dekatron and radar pioneer
