= Lewis Cook (footballer, born 1983) =

English footballer

Personal information
- Full name: Lewis John Cook
- Date of birth: 28 December 1983 (age 42)
- Place of birth: High Wycombe, England
- Height: 5 ft 7 in (1.70 m)
- Position: Winger

Team information
- Current team: Harrow Borough

Youth career
- 1997–2002: Wycombe Wanderers

Senior career*
Years	Team	Apps	(Gls)
2002–2004	Wycombe Wanderers	22	(0)
2004	→ Weymouth (loan)		
2004	→ Cambridge City (loan)		
2004–2005	Windsor & Eton		
2005	Maidenhead United		
2005–2006	Basingstoke Town	41	(5)
2006	Lewes	6	(0)
2006	→ Worthing (loan)	2	(1)
2006–2007	AFC Wimbledon	17	(3)
2007–2009	Staines Town		
2009	→ Boreham Wood (loan)		
2009–2010	Kingstonian		
2010	→ St Neots Town (loan)		
2010–	Harrow Borough		
- * Club domestic league appearances and goals

Lewis John Cook (born 28 December 1983) is an English footballer who played in the Football League for Wycombe Wanderers. A winger, he plays for Harrow Borough of the Isthmian League.

== Career ==
Cook was born in High Wycombe, and joined Wycombe Wanderers at the age of 14, and went on to make his Football League debut for the club on 17 August 2002, as a second-half substitute in a 3–3 draw at home to Mansfield Town. He spent time on loan to Southern League clubs Weymouth and Cambridge City in early 2004, and then joined Windsor & Eton of the Isthmian League at the end of the 2003–04 season.

He followed manager Dennis Greene to Maidenhead United in February 2005, moving on to fellow Conference South side Basingstoke Town for the 2005–06 season. After a brief spell with Conference South Lewes and a loan to Worthing, in October 2006 Cook joined AFC Wimbledon, where he spent the remainder of the 2006–07 season.

Cook moved on to Staines Town, where he stayed for two seasons. After a spell on loan to Boreham Wood at the end of the 2008–09 season, he signed for Kingstonian of the Isthmian League before the 2009–10 season. and joined St Neots Town of the United Counties League on a month's loan in January 2010.

Shortly after moving on loan, Cook signed for Harrow Borough on 18 January 2010.
