= Matthew Cook (disambiguation) =

Matthew Cook is an American mathematician.

Matthew or Matt Cook may also refer to:

- Matt Cook (actor) (born 1984), American television and film actor
- Matt Cook (historian), Birkbeck College professor
- Matt Cook (rugby league) (born 1986), English rugby union and rugby league footballer
- Matt Cook (sledge hockey) (1987–2010), Canadian ice sledge hockey player
- Matthew Cook (rugby union), (born 1978), Spanish international rugby union player

== See also ==
- Matthew Cooke (disambiguation)
