= Robin Cook (disambiguation) =

Robin Cook (1946–2005) was a British politician.

Robin Cook may also refer to:

- Robin Cook (American novelist) (born 1940)
- Derek Raymond (1931–1994), British novelist, born Robert William Arthur Cook, whose first books were published under the name Robin Cook
- Jonas Ekfeldt, or Robin Cook (born 1971), Swedish music producer and singer

== See also ==
- Robin Cooke, Baron Cooke of Thorndon (1926–2006), New Zealand judge
