= Jane Constance Cook =

Kwakwakaʼwakw First Nations leader (1870–1951)

Jane Constance Cook (Ga’axstal’as) (1870–1951) was a First Nations leader and activist of the Kwakwakaʼwakw people.

== Biography ==
Ga’axstal’as was born in 1870 at Port Blakely in Puget Sound, Washington. She was the daughter of Gwayulalas, a Kwagu'l noblewoman from Tsaxis (Fort Rupert, British Columbia) and a European fur trader William Gilbert. After her mother died, Ga’axstal’as returned to central coast villages and was educated by a missionary couple in 'Yalis (Alert Bay, BC). In 1888, Ga’axstal’as married Nage, Stephen Cook whose mother Kwak'waballas was from the Mowachaht and 'Namgis nations and whose father John Cook was an English ship builder. They had 16 children, ran a general store and a salmon saltery, and later, established a family commercial fishing fleet.

Like many First Nation women of her time, Ga’axstal’as was a midwife and throughout her life, she was called to comfort people who were dying. Ga’axstal’as was fluent in Kwak'wala and English. She became an official translator in the courts and at colonial meetings and she corresponded with colonial agents in the Anglican Church and all levels of the Department of Indian Affairs. As an activist for Indigenous rights, she wrote petitions and letters about injustices she witnessed. She testified before the McKenna–McBride Royal Commission, standing up with chiefs to make land claims and assert rights on their unceded territories in colonial British Columbia. Ga’axstal’as was the only woman to serve on the executive of the Allied Tribes of British Columbia where she testified about racist medical care and advocated for adequate health care for indigenous people living with TB. Her activism extended to asserting rights for a commercial as well as food fishery.

As someone living at the crossroads of customary ways and the drastic changes that colonial power brought to the people on the coast, Ga’axstal’as negotiated both worlds. She was part of a high-ranked, Kwakwakaʼwakw family and also an ardent Christian who was a leader in the Anglican Women Association in 'Yalis. She fought for recognition of Indigenous rights and she expressed criticism of some customary practices in her time, particularly as they affected women and girls in her family. Her complicated identities reflect the ways that colonialism imposed changes on all cultural systems. Epidemics had caused massive mortality among her people; colonial churches pressured conversion to Christianity (especially for women and girls); capitalist economies were overtaking traditional economies as First Nations were restricted from accessing their territories and technologies. Primary cultural institutions were in upheaval but they persisted. For Kwakwakaʼwakw peoples, the central institution of governance was the potlatch; a ritual site where marriages and diverse exchanges and transfers of symbolic and material property confer social status and other important things.

Works that mention Ga’axstal’as often state that she supported the potlatch ban (1884-1951). Her criticism of some practices associated with "the custom" revolved around shifting gender relations as people were caught between customary marriage practices in the potlatch and colonial marriage laws; between customary forms of wealth and the imposed cash economy. Her objections were aimed at changing potlatch practices of her day. Ga’axstal’as's views changed as she witnessed persecution of potlatchers under colonial law. Later, Ga’axstal’as worked with potlatching chiefs, scripting a petition against the potlatch ban and she also advocated for a chief whose potlatch goods had been confiscated by the colonial government. Her context was one of rapid change and social upheaval. As a bilingual, literate, economically secure, high-ranking Kwakwakaʼwakw woman, Ga’axstal’as had a powerful place from which to speak. "But her location only enabled what was certainly a remarkable will to act and be heard."

== Standing up with G̲a'ax̱sta'las: Jane Constance Cook and the Politics of Memory, Church, and Custom. ==
In 2012, the University of British Columbia Press published Standing Up with G̲a'ax̱sta'las, (L. Robertson with Gixsam clan) a collaborative, intergenerational biography on her life and impact on future generations. The book was on the short list for the François-Xavier Garneau Medal and received the Erminie Wheeler-Voegelin Prize from the American Society for Ethnohistory, as well as the Aboriginal History Prize, the Clio Prize and the Canadian Committee on Women's and Gender History book award from the Canadian Historical Association.
