= Christopher D. Cook =

British composer and conductor

Christopher Cook
- Born: Christopher David Cook; 18 November 1988 (age 37); Greenwich, London, England
- Genres: Film score, Orchestral
- Occupations: Composer, conductor
- Instruments: Piano, Synthesizer
- Years active: 2005–present

Christopher David Cook (born 18 November 1988) is a British composer and conductor, who composes mainly for film and television. He is known for creating music used in the opening ceremony for the London 2012 Olympic Games as well as composing music for numerous movie trailers.

== Early life and education ==
Christopher Cook was born in Greenwich, London. His musical talent was apparent at a young age. He learned to play piano by ear at 6 years old. He developed as a musician without formal training by listening to television adverts and film scores for the next 6 years.

Christopher was raised in Charlton, in SE London.

== Career ==
Cook started his film/television composing career, composing scores for low-budget independent films, TV adverts, and radio jingles whilst studying. He also at this time started composing, arranging and orchestrating for small and large orchestras, without any academic aid.

From 2007 to 2009, Cook had written several classical scores for piano and small orchestra, as well as submitting works to online music libraries. In 2010, Cook submitted works for the upcoming London 2012 Olympic games, but was only intended for advertisement purposes only.

On 27 July 2012, The London Olympic Games commenced, with the soundtrack being released the day after, selling over 10,000 copies within the first 24 hours of it going on sale. Along with the success of the Olympics, Christopher has also composed scores for major film trailers. These include "Angels & Demons", "War Horse", and "Lincoln". He has also written music for several small theatre plays and conducted several musicals, including "Wicked (musical)" on London's West End. He also provided some orchestrations for "Titanic Live", a concert at The Royal Albert Hall in which the late "James Horner" made one of his last public appearances. Cook still orchestrates and arranges for studios in London and Los Angeles as well as composing for numerous events.

He currently teaches music at The King's School, Grantham in Lincolnshire, England.

== Influences ==
Cook is heavily inspired by the great film composers of the 20th Century, such as the late James Horner, Danny Elfman, Jerry Goldsmith and John Williams. His composing technique, often emulates the orchestral style of Williams and his contemporaries.

== Awards ==
- Jury Prize (2011) for "The Man Who Fell Out of Bed"
- NME – Greatest Music Moment of the Year (2013)

== Discography ==
- "Isles of Wonder" – The Music for the Opening Ceremony London 2012 Olympic Games (2012)
