= Paul Cook (disambiguation) =

Paul Cook (born 1956) is the former drummer for the Sex Pistols.

Paul Cook may also refer to:

- Paul Cook (author), science fiction author
- Paul Cook (baseball) (1863–1905), baseball player
- Paul Cook (footballer) (born 1967), English football manager and former player
- Paul Cook (jockey) (born 1946), flat racing jockey
- Paul Cook (IQ drummer), drummer for the progressive rock band IQ
- Paul Cook (politician) (born 1943), California politician
- Paul Cook (rugby league) (born 1976), rugby league footballer
- Paul M. Cook (1924–2020), American businessman, founder of Raychem
- W. Paul Cook (1880–1948), writer, printer and publisher

== See also ==
- Paul Cooke (born 1961), drummer for Sade
