= Sharon Anne Cook =

Canadian historian

- Born: 1947 (age 78–79)
- Occupations: Professor, author

Academic background
- Education: Carleton University

Academic work
- Discipline: Cultural history
- Sub-discipline: Educational historian, women's history
- Institutions: University of Ottawa
- Main interests: Canadian women's history and tobacco smoking

Sharon Anne Cook (born 1947) is a Canadian historian, currently the Emeritus Professor and Distinguished Professor of History at University of Ottawa, and also a published author.

== Education ==
Cook received a B.A. (Hon.) from Carleton University in 1970; a B.Ed. from Queen's University in 1971; a M.A. from the Institute of Canadian Studies, Carleton University in 1987; and a Ph.D. in History from Carleton University in 1990.

== Works ==
- Cook, Sharon Anne (18 July 1995). Through Sunshine and Shadow: The Woman's Christian Temperance Union, Evangelicalism, and Reform in Ontario, 1874-1930. Montréal: McGill-Queen's University Press. ISBN 0-773-51305-1.
- Cook, Sharon Anne; McLean, Lorna R.; O'Rourke, Kate, eds. (14 May 2001). Framing Our Past Canadian Women's History in the Twentieth Century. Montreal: McGill-Queen's University Press. ISBN 0773569111.
- Cook, Sharon Anne (11 April 2012). Sex, Lies, and Cigarettes: Canadian Women, Smoking, and Visual Culture, 1880-2000. Montreal: McGill-Queen's University Press. ISBN 978-0-773-53977-8.
