= Myron Cook =

American geologist

- Born: 1961/62
- Occupations: Geologist; Youtuber
- Years active: 2022-present

YouTube information
- Channel: Myron Cook
- Subscribers: 243 thousand
- Views: 31.9 million
- Website: https://myroncookgeology.com/

Myron Cook (born 1961/62) is a U.S. geologist and youtuber.

When Cook was young, he became known among geologists for the discovery of a cave in the Bighorn Mountains proving that the highest parts of the mountain range was once submerged, and formed while it was seafloor as part of the Western Interior Seaway.

Cook worked as a petroleum geologist for 35 years. After his retirement, he moved to Burlington, Wyoming and began uploading youtube videos about the geology of Wyoming. He quickly gained a following, and began expanding the regions he talked about. Most of his videos cover more obscure geological features. He has been likened to Bob Ross, being called the 'Bob Ross of geology'.

In 2025, the documentary 'He Just Wanted To Talk About Geology… Now He’s A YouTube Star' was made about him. Also that year, he proposed two theories for sandstone formations in Big Horn Basin near Worland, Wyoming that resembled petrified trees. Cook concluded that the formations were most likely the results of sediment from a riverbed, buried and encased in a concretion, that was then exposed again during erosion.
