= Christopher Cook (American writer) =

American writer (born 1952)

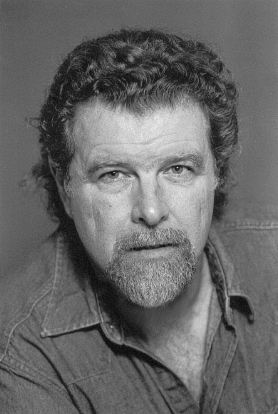
- Cook in c. 2000
- Born: Christopher LaVaughn Cook; August 3, 1952 (age 72); Tucson, Arizona, U.S.
- Occupation: Writer
- Known for: Novels and stories, often set in Texas and the American South
- Spouse: Katerina Pinosova
- Children: Athena

Christopher LaVaughn Cook (born August 3, 1952) is an American writer whose writing styles and genres include journalism, non-fiction, scriptwriting and fiction, including short stories, novellas and novels.

== Overview ==
Cook is the author of many short stories and two noted fiction books, Robbers and Screen Door Jesus & Other Stories. He was chosen by Barnes & Noble as part of its Discover Great New Writers program in 2001. His books are available in foreign editions, and his stories have been included in anthologies such as Houghton Mifflin's The Best American Mystery Stories 2003. His memoir essay "Full Moon Over Bohemia," set in the Czech Republic, was selected for The Best Travel Writing anthology in 2006.

In 2011, he announced he would begin publishing his fiction exclusively in digital format as e-books. His first e-book release under that plan was his novella Storm. He has also placed his previous books online as e-books.

The feature movie Screen Door Jesus, based on Cook's story collection of the same name, was released in 2003. The movie received film festival awards in the U.S. in several categories, including for best cinematography, best original score, and best feature film. His novel Robbers has been under option for film and TV for the past decade by independent filmmakers and by studios, including Sony and CBS, but has yet to reach fruition in the screen medium.

== Biography ==
A native of Texas, Cook grew up in Port Neches, a small town east of Houston near the Texas-Louisiana border, an ethnically and culturally diverse region characterized by the East Texas forests to the north, the Gulf Coast beaches and marshlands to the south, and the cypress swamps of Cajun Louisiana to the east. This unique geographic region – part of the American South in culture and language – has figured largely in Cook's writing.

Also figuring in his work, especially the short fiction, is the charismatic, fundamentalist Pentecostalism of his family when he was growing up. He embraced those religious beliefs as an adolescent and planned to become a Pentecostal preacher. During his high school years, however, Cook began to question the dogmas and beliefs of that sect and eventually left it altogether. He explored this cultural and religious terrain in depth in his story collection Screen Door Jesus & Other Stories.

Cook studied psychology and pre-medicine, with minor focus on philosophy and religion, at Rice University in Houston, Texas, and Macalester College in St. Paul, Minnesota, where he took his B.A. degree in 1976. He subsequently began free-lancing for the Minneapolis Star newspaper and decided to pursue a career in journalism.

== Professional career ==
In 1979, Cook left the Minneapolis Star to become the crime reporter for the Birmingham Post-Herald in Alabama. He later worked for daily newspapers in Georgia and Texas, where he was recognized by the Texas Press Association with awards for feature column writing and for reporting.

In the late 1980s, Cook left journalism to work for the John Gray Institute, a Texas-based non-profit "think tank" focused on a variety of public policy issues, including labor-management relations, economic development, and environmental regulation and reform. He left the institute to work as a speechwriter for former U.S. Secretary of Labor William Usery, Jr., in Washington, D.C. He later returned to Texas and in 1989 entered the University of Texas School of Law, at the same time serving as Communications Director of the Texas AFL-CIO.

In 1994, Cook moved to Paris, France, where he worked first in the European Office of the AFL-CIO, then later for a public sector trade union organization based near Geneva. It was during this period that he began to write fiction more seriously. In 1995, his short story "The Pickpocket" won first prize in the annual literary competition co-sponsored by Sorbonne University and Paris Transcontinental magazine.

In 1996, he moved to San Miguel de Allende, Mexico, to pursue writing narrative fiction full-time. It was there he wrote his first published novel, Robbers. It was rejected by almost 40 publishers in the U.S. After it was purchased by publishers Payot Rivages in France and No Exit in the UK, the U.S. publisher Carroll & Graf (now part of The Perseus Books Group) bought it for publication in 2000. The New York Times called Robbers "a novel with classic noir bones" and observed Cook's writing style showed "fearless originality, in a lyric voice that sings itself raw."

Robbers has been translated into a number of foreign editions, including its award-winning French edition Voleurs with Pierre Bondil as translator.

Cook's second book, Screen Door Jesus & Other Stories, was a finalist for the Texas Institute of Letters Jesse H. Jones Fiction Award in 2001. He moved to Prague, Czech Republic that same year, where he began writing screenplays. After a two-year hiatus during which he studied guitar, Cook returned to writing screenplays and narrative fiction. In summer 2011, he released the novellas Storm and Cloven Tongues of Fire, as well as the story collection Tiger Ridge – Three Stories and the bilingual (French-English) story "The Pickpocket". All those publications are e-books. Cook is working on another novel.

== Personal life ==
Cook was a single parent from 1985 until 1994. His daughter, Athena Gerbsch-Cook, and grandson Asa Christopher, reside in the United States. Cook is married to Czech artist and poet Katerina Pinosova. They live in Prague, Czech Republic, and San Miguel de Allende, Mexico.
