= Arthur Cook =

Arthur Cook may refer to:

- Arthur Cook (Australian politician) (1883–1945), Australian politician
- Arthur Cook (cricketer) (1889–1970), South African cricketer
- Arthur Cook (footballer) (1890–?), footballer for Swansea Town and West Bromwich Albion
- Arthur Cook (New Zealand politician) (1886–1943), New Zealand politician
- Arthur Cook (sport shooter) (1928–2021), U.S. Olympic sport shooter
- Arthur Bernard Cook (1868–1952), British classical scholar
- A. J. Cook (trade unionist) (1883–1931), British coal miner and trade union leader
- Arthur Leonard Cook (1913–1991), Australian boxer
- Arthur Cook (Pennsylvania politician), Speaker of the Pennsylvania Provincial Assembly in 1689

== See also ==
- Arthur Coke Burnell (1840–1882), pronounced Arthur Cook Burnell, English scholar of Sanskrit
- Arthur Hafford Cooke (1912–1987), English academic administrator at the University of Oxford
