= Jeffrey Cook =

Jeffrey or Jeff Cook may refer to:

- Jeffrey Cook (British Army officer) (born 1954), Director for Security Liaison in the Royal Household of the Sovereign of the United Kingdom
- Jeffrey Cook (cricketer) (born 1972), Anglo-Australian cricketer
- Jeff Cook (1949–2022), American musician
- Jeff Cook (basketball) (born 1956), retired American professional basketball player
- Jeff Cook (English footballer) (born 1953), English former footballer
- Jeff Cook (golfer) (born 1961), American golfer
- Jeff Cook (lacrosse) (1960–2011), American lacrosse player
- Jeff Cook (soccer coach), American soccer coach

== See also ==
- Geoff Cook (disambiguation)
- Geoff Cooke (disambiguation)
