= James Cook (footballer, born 1885) =

Scottish footballer (1885–1971)

Personal information
- Full name: James B. Cook
- Date of birth: 10 September 1885
- Place of birth: Kilbirnie, Scotland
- Date of death: 1 December 1971 (aged 86)
- Place of death: River Forest, United States
- Position: Winger

Senior career*
Years	Team	Apps	(Gls)
1906–1908	Grimsby Town	8	(0)
1908–1909	Plymouth Argyle	15	(0)
1909	Hull City	0	(0)
- * Club domestic league appearances and goals

James B. Cook (10 September 1885 – 1 December 1971) was a Scottish professional footballer who played as a winger.

== Playing career ==
Cook played for various Scottish clubs before moving south in 1906 to sign with Grimsby Town of the Football League Second Division. He played eight games for the "Mariners" and then signed with Plymouth Argyle in 1908 alongside teammate Tommy Hakin. He made his debut on 16 September 1908, in a 1–0 victory over Brentford at Home Park. He played fifteen games in the 1908–09 season, ten times in the Southern League Division One and five times in the Western League Division One. He was described by the Argyle handbook as "speedy, dashing and able to centre with accuracy", but was released at the end of the campaign.

== Personal life ==
Cook emigrated to the United States in August 1909, settling in Chicago where he worked for General Motors. He later founded and served as President of the Kloster Steel Corporation. He died on 1 December 1971 after suffering a heart attack while driving his car which then collided with a tree in River Forest, Illinois. Cook was pronounced dead on arrival at Gottlieb Memorial Hospital.
