= Jim Cook (footballer, born 1904) =

English footballer

Personal information
- Full name: James Reginald Cook
- Date of birth: 1904
- Place of birth: Herrington, England
- Position: Wing half

Senior career*
Years	Team	Apps	(Gls)
1921–1922	Chester-le-Street Town		
1922–1923	Grimsby Town	5	(0)
1923–192?	West Stanley		
- * Club domestic league appearances and goals

James Reginald Cook (born 1904) was an English professional footballer who played as a wing half.
