= Steve Cook (disambiguation) =

Steve Cook (born 1991) is an English footballer.

Steve Cook, Steven Cook or Steve Cooke may also refer to:

- Steve Cook (bodybuilder) (born 1984), American professional bodybuilder and former Mr. Olympia
- Steve Cook (bowler) (born 1957), American ten-pin bowler
- Steve Cook (cyclist), American former professional mountain bike racer
- Steve Cook (pool player) (1946–2003), American pocket billiards player
- Steve Cook (skier) (born 1968), Paralympian skier
- Steven Cook, British artist, photographer, and graphic designer
- Steven A. Cook, American foreign policy writer
- Steve Cooke (baseball) (born 1970), American baseball player
- Steve Cooke (football coach) (born 1968), English football manager
- Steve Cooke, quizzer on BBC2's Eggheads quiz programme

== See also ==
- Stephen Cook (disambiguation)
- Stephen Cooke (born 1982), English footballer
