= Johnny Cook =

Johnny Cook may refer to:

- Johnny Cook (singer) (1949–2000), Southern Gospel singer
- Johnny Cook (Canadian football) (1925–1986), American football quarterback in the Canadian Football League
- Johnny Cooke (1934–2024), English boxer

== See also ==
- Johnie Cooks (1958–2023), American football linebacker
- John Cook (disambiguation)
- John Cooke (disambiguation)
