= Daniel J. Cook =

American philosopher

Academic background
- Education: Columbia University (PhD)
- Thesis: The Role of Language in Hegel's Philosophy (1968)

Academic work
- Era: Contemporary philosophy
- Region: Western philosophy
- School or tradition: German Idealism
- Institutions: Brooklyn College

Daniel Joseph Cook is an emeritus professor of philosophy at Brooklyn College, CUNY.

== Life and works ==
=== Selected publications ===
- Cook, Daniel J. (1973). Language in the Philosophy of Hegel. De Gruyter Mouton. doi:10.1515/9783110876284. ISBN 978-3-11-087628-4.

==== Translations ====
- Leibniz, Gottfried Wilhelm (1977). Discourse on the Natural Theology of the Chinese. Translated by Cook, Daniel J. University of Hawaii Press. doi:10.1515/9780824886028. ISBN 978-0-8248-8602-8.
- Leibniz, Gottfried Wilhelm (1994). Writings on China. Translated by Cook, Daniel J. Open Court. ISBN 978-0-8126-9250-1.
