= James Cavanah Murphy =

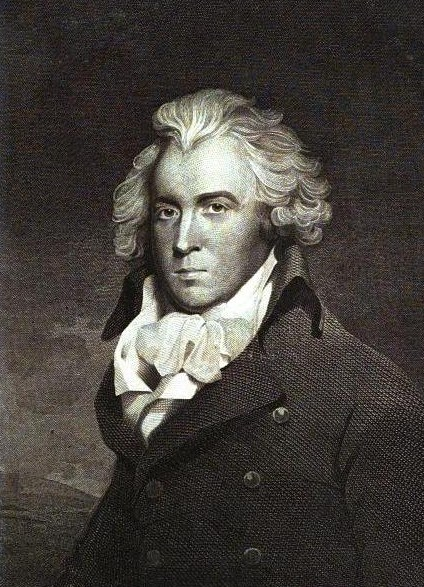
- James Cavanah Murphy, engraving after Martin Archer Shee, from Travels in Portugal (1795)
- Born: 1760; Blackrock, Cork
- Died: 1814 (aged 53–54)
- Occupation: Architect

James Cavanah Murphy (1760–1814) was an Irish architect and antiquary.

== Life ==
Murphy was born at Blackrock, Cork, and was originally a bricklayer. He made his way to Dublin to study, and his name appeared in a list of the pupils of the drawing school of the Dublin Society about 1775, as working in miniature, chalk, and crayons. Later he practised in Dublin. In 1786 he was one of seven architects who were consulted on additions to the House of Commons, and he and another carried out the execution of James Gandon's design for the work.

In December 1788, William Burton Conyngham commissioned Murphy to make drawings of Batalha Monastery in central Portugal. He was back in Dublin in 1790, and was in England at the end of the year. In 1802, he went to Cádiz, where he remained for seven years studying Moorish architecture, with some diplomatic duties.

Settling again in England in 1809, Murphy took out a patent in 1813 for a method of preserving timber and other substances from decay. He spent his time in preparing his notes on Moorish architecture for the press, but died on 12 September 1814 in Edward Street, Cavendish Square, London (later Lower Seymour Street), when only part of his major book had been published.

== Works ==
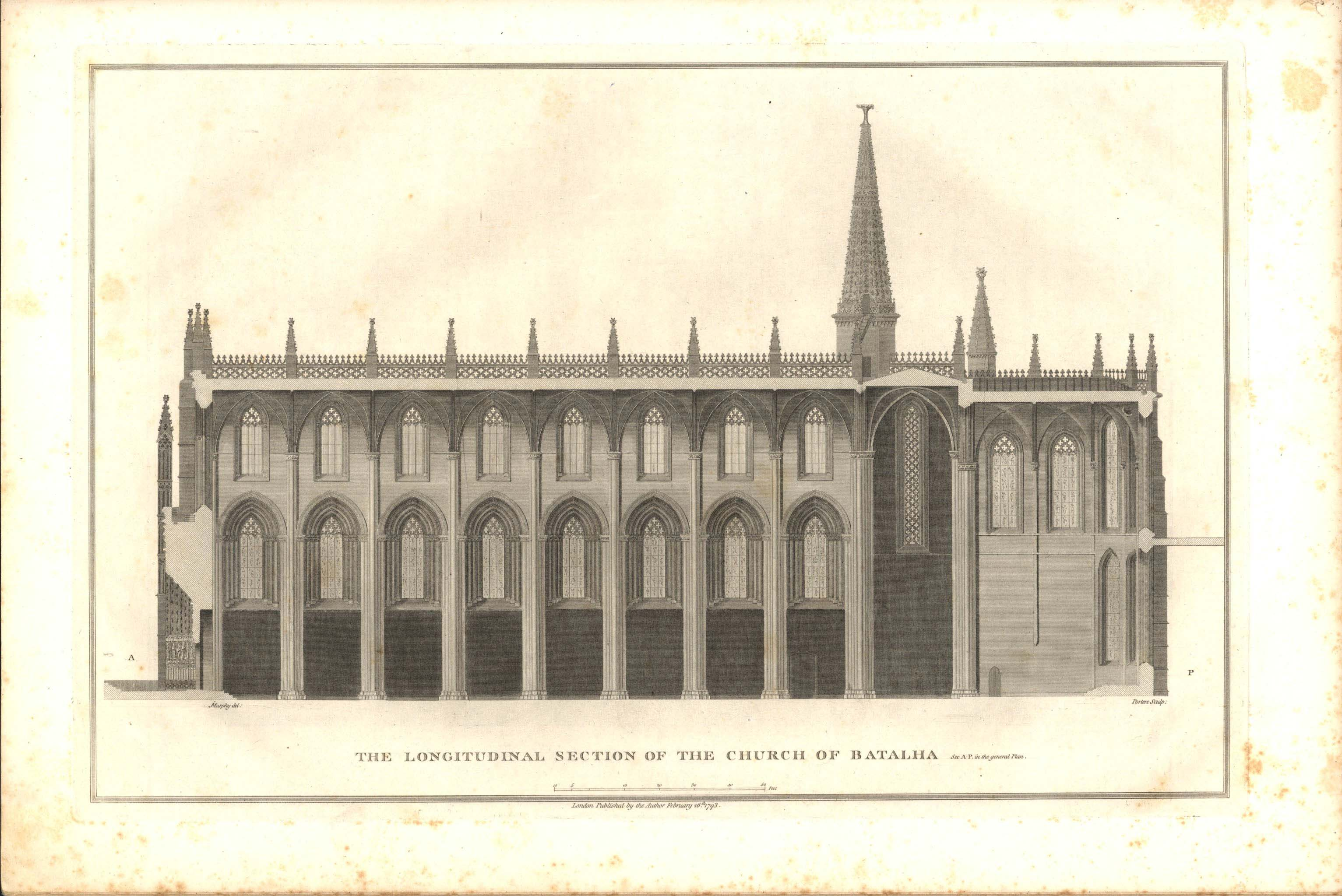
Longitudinal Section of the Church of Batalha in Portugal, from Plans, Elevations, Sections, and Views of the Church of Batalha

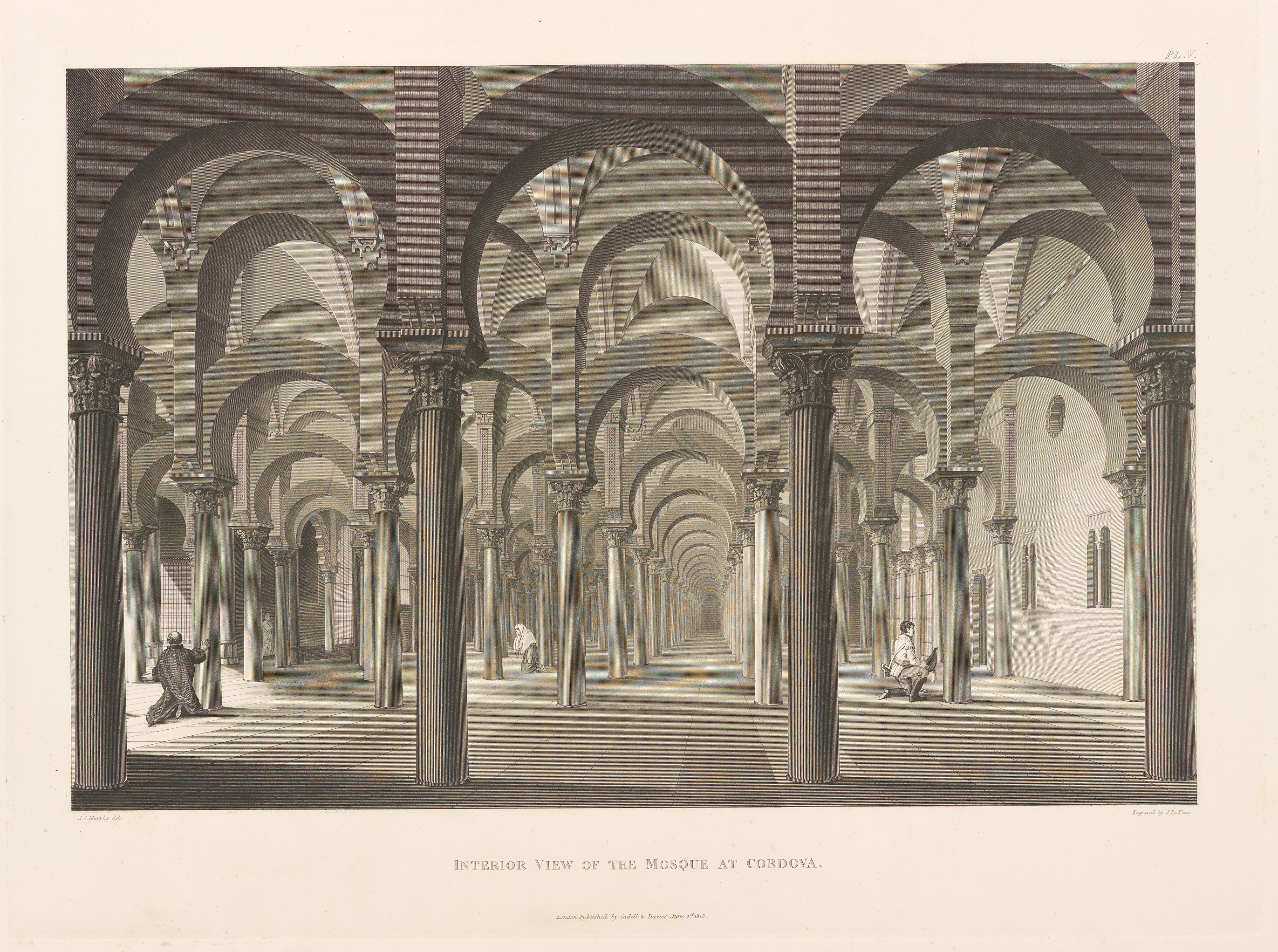
Cordoba Mosque Interior from Arabian Antiquities of Spain

Murphy's published works were:

- Plans, Elevations, Sections, and Views of the Church of Batalha. ... To which is prefixed an Introductory Discourse on the Principles of Gothic Architecture, twenty-seven plates, London, 1795, 1836. A history and description of the church by Manoel de Sousa Coutinho, translated by Murphy, is on pp. 27–57. A German translation of the Discourse on Gothic Architecture, as Ueber die Grundregeln der gothischen Bauart, by Johann Daniel Edward Wilhelm Engelhardt, was published in Darmstadt in 1828.
- Travels in Portugal, London, 1795. A German translation by M. C. Sprengel was published at Halle in 1796 as vol. vi. of an Auswahl derbesten auslandischen . . . Nachrichten, and a French translation by Lallemant in Paris, in 1797.
- General View of the State of Portugal, London, 1798.
- Arabian Antiquities of Spain, London, 1813–16, embellished with 110 plates from drawings by Murphy. The work was edited and the descriptions written by Thomas Hartwell Horne, who saw it through the press. A History of the Mahometan Empire, by John Shakespear, Horne, and John Gillies, and intended as an introduction to Murphy's book, was published in London in 1816.

Thomas Crofton Croker mentioned that Murphy left a large collection of notes and drawings. A large folio volume of his drawings of arabesque ornaments went to the library of the Royal Institute of British Architects.

== Family ==
Murphy was unmarried, and his estate of £5,000 was administered in November 1814 by his sister, Hannah, wife of Bernard McNamara.
