= Cocq =

Cocq is a French surname, meaning rooster. Notable people with the surname include:

- Frans Banninck Cocq (1605–1655), 17th century burgemeester
- Fernand Cocq (1861–1940), Belgian politician
- Hendrick Joseph Cornelius Maria de Cocq (1906–1998), Dutch prelate

== See also ==
- Lecocq
