= Elizabeth Cooke (silversmith) =

British artist

- Occupation: Silversmith

Elizabeth Cooke was an English silversmith.

Resident in London, Cooke was the widow either of largeworker Thomas Cooke II, who died in 1761 or of Samuel Cooke. She registered her own mark on 24 January 1764; classed as a smallworker, she lived in Foster Lane. A George III salver of 1767 is owned by the National Museum of Women in the Arts. She is known to have been alive as late as 23 September 1773, as at that date she is mentioned as the main beneficiary in the will of her brother-in-law Edward Cooke.
