= Nick Cook =

Nick Cook may refer to:

- Nick Cook (cricketer) (born 1956), English cricketer and umpire
- Nick Cook (writer), British defence consultant on issues of climate change, author and former aviation journalist
- Nicky Cook (born 1979), British boxer
- Nicholas Cook (born 1950), British musicologist and writer
