= Allison Cook =

Allison Cook may refer to:

- Allison Claire Cook, an injured victim of the 2007 Virginia Tech shooting
- Allison Tranquilli (born 1972), formerly Cook, Australian basketball player
