= Ben Cook (coach) =

American strength coach

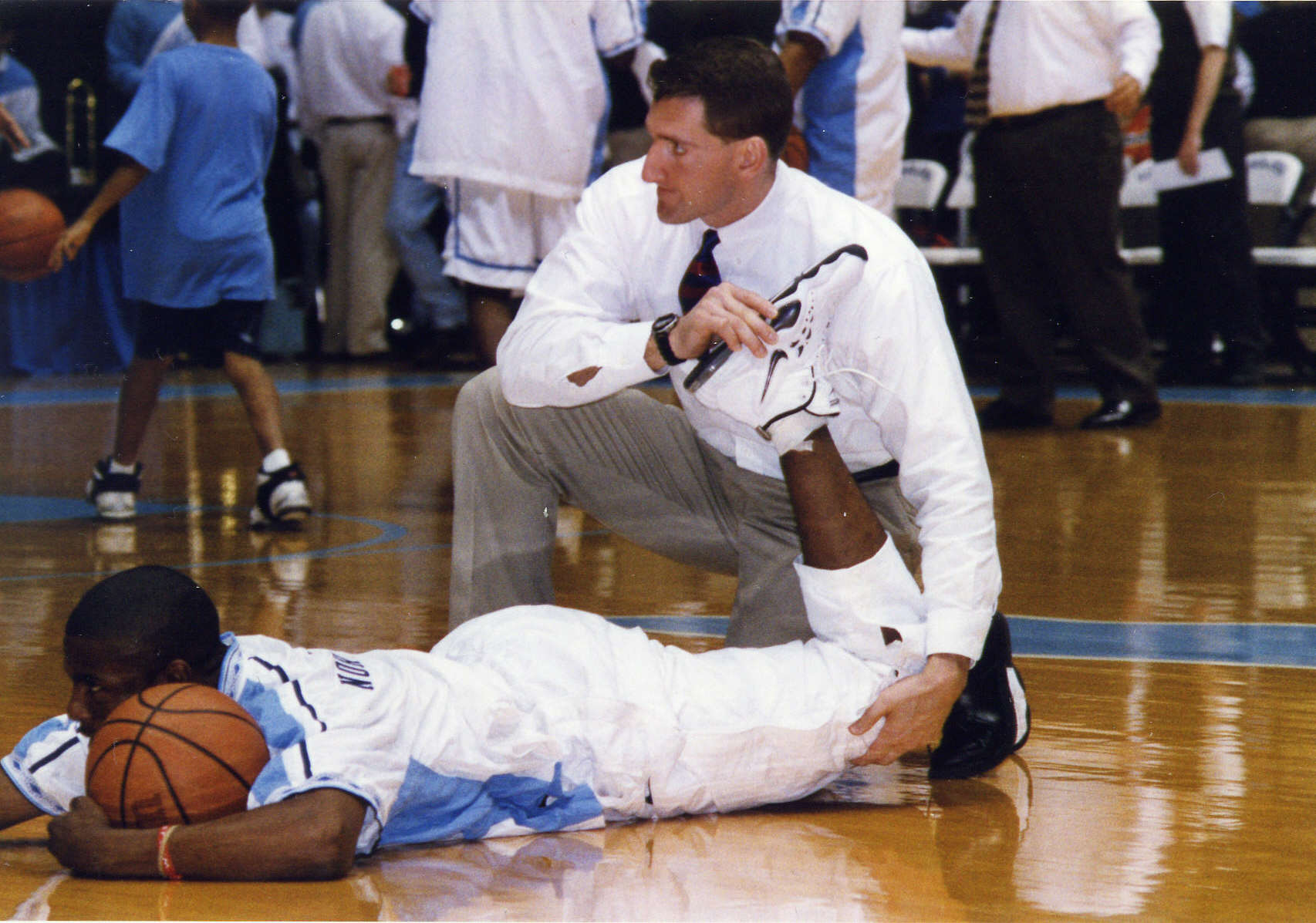
- Cook with Shammond Williams
- Born: October 26, 1963 (age 62)
- Organization(s): University of North Carolina, Evernham Motorsports, Team Red Bull, Michael Waltrip Racing, Richard Petty Motorsports
- Notable work: 52-Week Football Training, Total Basketball Fitness: A 52-Week, Year-Round Training Program, Jumpmetrics

Ben Cook (born October 26, 1963) is an American collegiate and professional strength coach and author. He has published a number of books and articles. He is currently a member of the training staff at PIT Instruction and Training in Mooresville, North Carolina.

He was a Certified Strength and Conditioning Specialist (1989–2012) and Certified Personal Trainer (1999–2012) offered by the National Strength and Conditioning Association. He has since formally resigned both credentials.

== Educational background ==
Cook was born in Denton, North Carolina. He obtained a Bachelor of Science in exercise and sports science from Pfeiffer University in 1987, and in 1995 received his Master of Arts in Exercise and Sports Science from the University of North Carolina at Chapel Hill.

== Coaching career ==
Cook began his career in 1987 at Appalachian State University as an assistant under head strength coach Chip Sigmon. In the fall of 1989, he began work at the University of North Carolina at Chapel Hill as an assistant for head football strength and conditioning coaches Rich Tuten and Jeff Madden. In 1993 Cook began as the head strength coach for the North Carolina Tar Heels men's basketball team, spending eight years with the Tar Heels. He was a coaching staff member of four Final Four teams while serving three Carolina head basketball coaches; Dean Smith, Bill Guthridge, and Matt Doherty. In 2001 Cook became the Director of Sports Performance for Carolinas Sports Performance in Charlotte North Carolina. In 2003 Cook became one of the first full time strength coaches for the sport of NASCAR when he began working for NASCAR Hall of Fame Crew Chief and Team Owner Ray Evernham. Cook served as strength coach for an assortment of NASCAR teams; Evernham Motorsports from 2003–2006, Red Bull Racing Team from 2006–2009, Michael Waltrip Racing from 2009–2011 and Richard Petty Motorsports in 2015.

== Authored works ==
Cook has authored several books, instructional videos and articles concerning strength and conditioning training.

=== Books ===
- 52-Week Football Training
- Total Basketball Fitness: A 52-Week, Year-Round Training Program
- Jumpmetrics

=== Videos ===
- Strength Training for Basketball
- Developmental Conditioning Drills for Basketball
- Speed & Agility Training for Baseball
