= Ryan Cook =

Ryan Cook may refer to:

- Ryan Cook (American football) (born 1983), who plays for the Dallas Cowboys
- Ryan Cook (Australian rules footballer) (born 1988), who played for the Collingwood Magpies
- Ryan Cook (baseball) (born 1987), Nippon Professional Baseball player
- Ryan Cook (musician) (born 1981), country music artist
- Ryan Dallas Cook (1982–2005), trombone player in the ska band Suburban Legends

== See also ==
- Ryan Cooke, Australian physicist
