= Beit Memorial Fellowships for Medical Research =

Historic fellowships in the UK

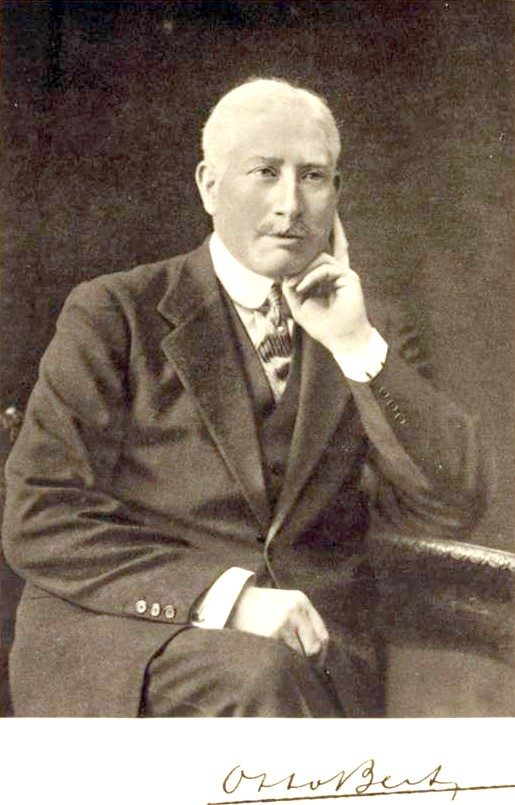
Sir Otto John Beit, 1st Baronet

The Beit Memorial Medical Fellowships were one of the most prestigious and competitive fellowships for post-doctoral or medical degree research in medicine in the United Kingdom. The Fellowships were founded in 1909 by Sir Otto Beit, a German-born British financier, philanthropist and art connoisseur, in memory of his brother Alfred Beit.

Beit Memorial Fellows have been awarded a number of prestigious prizes with seven Nobel Prizes including two for Frederick Sanger (1944) and the 2012 prize for medicine for John Gurdon. Nobel laureates who have held Beit fellowships are Alexander R. Todd (chemistry, 1957), Fred Sanger (chemistry, 1958 and 1980), Macfarlane Burnet (physiology or medicine, 1960), Bernard Katz (physiology or medicine, 1970) and Tim Hunt (physiology or medicine, 2001). The first female member of the Royal Society in 1945 was Marjory Stephenson (1914 Beit fellowship) an early recipient of the fellowship.

The Beit Memorial Medical Fellowships were replaced by the prestigious Wellcome-Beit Prize Fellowships in 2009.

== See also ==
- List of chemistry awards
- List of medicine awards
