= Greg Cook (disambiguation) =

Greg Cook (1946–2012) was an American football quarterback.

Greg Cook may also refer to:

- Greg Cook (basketball) (1958–2005), American basketball player
- Greg Cook (cartoonist) (21st century), American comic book artist
- Greg Cook (judge), American judge, associate justice of the Supreme Court of Alabama
- Greg Cook (rugby league) (born 1956), Australian rugby league player
- Greg Cook (born 1965), American country music bassist with Ricochet
