= Richard B. Cook =

British writer

Richard Briscoe Cook (1838–1916), D.D., was a British author most known for his biography of William Ewart Gladstone, The Grand Old Man.

== Major works ==
- The Grand Old Man
