= Frank Cooke (broadcaster) =

English broadcaster (1923–2007)

Frank E. Cooke (1923–2007) was an English broadcaster and writer dedicated to making the Bible accessible to ordinary people.

Cooke left school without any qualifications, and one of his early jobs was cleaning the floors of the London Stock Exchange while he developed his career as a jazz clarinetist. Soon after becoming a believing Christian, he was called up for Army service with the Royal Army Medical Corps; he served in Europe and India, being known throughout only for his clarinet and football skills.

By the age of 23, Cooke had never read a book. So the shock of being accepted as a student by a college of the University of Manchester was matched only by that of seeing his first 'required reading' book list. He persevered and became interested in helping others to whom reading is a 'closed book'.

Later on, at the University of London, Frank studied for a Bachelor of Divinity degree. He became a Baptist minister and held pastorates at Bacup in Lancashire, at Hinckley, at Purley and at Andover. For four years he was the interim pastor of a new church at Amesbury until it became sufficiently large to call its first full-time minister. For fourteen years he was the chaplain of Spurgeon's College in London. He became a member of the Baptist Council and was elected President of the Baptist Union of Great Britain in 1983.

He was experienced not only as a writer, but also as a broadcaster, having been involved in writing and presenting for many radio and TV programmes. He presented the weekly 'God slot' show on London's Capital Radio, and was a regular contributor on BBC Radio 4, Transworld Radio, and many other stations.

He died in 2007.

== Partial bibliography ==
- Cooke, Frank E. Jesus Rules: An Up to Date Guide to the Sermon on the Mount. Worthing, West Sussex, England: Henry Walter Ltd, 1978. ISBN 0-85479-811-0
- Cooke, Frank E. The Family of God. West Sussex, England: Henry Walter Ltd, 1979. ISBN 0-85479-951-6
- Christmas Bible Stories
- Cooke's Tour of the Bible
- Get together
- Good News Starts Here
- Jesus (Scripture Union)
- Living in the Covenant
- Praise Away
- Sing Song Roundabout
- Through The Year With Frank Cooke
- Word for Today
