= Harry Cook (martial artist) =

English martial artist and author (born 1949)

- Born: Henry Wilson Cook; 1949 (age 76–77); South Shields, Tyne and Wear, England
- Style: Shotokan Karate, Goju-ryu Karate
- Teachers: Keinosuke Enoeda, Morio Higaonna
- Rank: 7th dan karate

Henry Wilson Cook (born 1949), widely known as Harry Cook, is a former British martial artist, teacher, and author, and convicted sex offender. He has written several martial art books, most notably Shotokan Karate: A precise history (2001). Cook began training in karate in 1966, and was the Chief Instructor of the Seijinkai Karatedo Association, a school he founded to teach his own style of karate. He holds the rank of 7th dan in karate. He admitted to numerous sexual offenses over the course of 26 years, including indecent assault, sexual assault, making indecent and possessing pornographic images of children, and was given a 10-year prison sentence in June 2012.

== Early life ==
Cook was born in 1949 in South Shields, England. He began training in the martial arts in 1966, learning karate from two schoolmates. They belonged to a Wado-ryu school, which he joined in September 1966. Subsequently, the Wado-ryu instructors moved from the area, and Cook joined Ken Smith's Shotokan-ryu dojo (training hall) in Sunderland. In the late 1960s, Cook was one of the first British karate students to train under Keinosuke Enoeda. Having completed secondary school, he held the rank of 4th kyu in karate.

Cook studied surveying for a year, but then moved on to studying Chinese language at Durham University. At university, he came into contact with Rose Li, one of the lecturers, who taught Cook tai chi. In 1970, Cook established the Durham University Karate Club, which became affiliated to the Karate Union of Great Britain. He was tested for 1st kyu by Andy Sherry. In 1973, Cook received a Bachelor of Arts degree in Chinese studies from Durham University. A year later, he earned a Postgraduate Certificate in Education from the same institution.

== Career ==
Cook embarked on a career as a schoolteacher, but this was to be short-lived—only around two years. He successfully applied for a job in Japan. Cook had originally planned to travel to China, but, as he recalled in a 1988 interview, "at that time it was difficult to enter, so I opted for Japan as it was more Westernized and more modern." Arriving in Japan in the mid-1970s, Cook started work as a teacher of the English language. He had intended to visit the Japan Karate Association, but Terry O'Neill recommended visiting Morio Higaonna's Goju-ryu karate dojo, which Cook did. While he trained under Hirokazu Kanazawa occasionally, and also studied sword and stick fighting arts, most of his training was under Higaonna. In interviews conducted years later, Cook would speak very positively of Higaonna.

After two years, Cook had reached 2nd dan. His work contract completed, he returned to England, but only stayed six months before coming back to Japan. He settled in Kyoto and began studying butokukan and naginata. Cook eventually returned to England, and was based in Haltwhistle, Northumberland.

Cook founded his own school, the Seijinkai Karatedo Association, to teach his blend of Shotokan and Goju-ryu karate styles. The association now has branches in Ireland, Norway, and the United States of America, as well as the United Kingdom.

== Conviction ==
In May 2011, Cook appeared in Newcastle Magistrates' Court facing charges of sexual assault. He pleaded guilty to charges in regard to a female from March 2006 to February 2011 and was held on remand awaiting sentencing at Newcastle Crown Court. In January 2012, Cook pleaded guilty to a further 29 charges, including indecent assault, sexual assault, making indecent images of children and possessing indecent images of children, a pornographic image of a child and a prohibited image of a child. In June 2012, he was sentenced to 10 years. Cook's family, who have renounced him, expressed their support and sympathy for the victims, and their utter condemnation of his actions.

== Publications ==
Cook's best-known work is probably Shotokan Karate: A precise history, which Dragon Times editor J. N. Edwards has described as "certainly the best book on Shotokan, probably the best karate book ever published in the English language." An independent assessment by Rob Redmond concluded that, for students of Shotokan karate, "there cannot be a better resource than Harry Cook's famous Shotokan Karate: A Precise History." One criticism has been that Cook should have provided more interpretation of the verbatim quotations; "While [the use of exact quotes] is exemplary and well intentioned, it was, for me, one of the few 'turnoffs' in the book. Sometimes we need Mr. Cook to provide his view and interpretation of what those he interviewed meant, as the exact phrasings uttered often beg for such historical analysis," wrote Tom Militello. A second edition of this book was published in August 2009.

Cook's other books include: Samurai: The story of a warrior tradition (1993), The way of the warrior: Essays on the martial arts (1999/2004, two volumes), The Shotokan Karate book of quotes (2001, co-authored), Karate (2005), and Extreme survival (2006, co-authored). Cook is a Contributing Editor for Classical Fighting Arts, which was formerly Dragon Times until March 2003. He has written several articles for Dragon Times.

Reflecting on his contribution to karate scholarship, Cook has said: "I am deeply interested in history and I came to understand that many of the myths prevalent in karate were derived from an abysmal understanding of the history and evolution of karate. So I decided to light a candle against the dark!! Have I achieved my objective? Not really … the same myths are still heard over and over again … but maybe one [or] two people have been pointed in the right direction."

== See also ==
- Japanese martial arts
