= Francis Cooke (disambiguation) =

Francis Cooke may refer to:

- Francis Cooke (c. 1583–1663), Mayflower passenger
- Francis Judd Cooke (1910–1995), American composer and musician
- Francis Cooke, Sheriff of Nottingham 1654/55
- Francis Cooke (judge) KC (born 1965), judge at the Court of Appeal of New Zealand

== See also ==
- Frank Cooke (disambiguation)
