= Frederick Cook (disambiguation) =

Frederick Cook (1865–1940) was an American explorer and physician.

Frederick Cook may also refer to:

- Frederick Cook (American politician) (1833–1905), Secretary of State of New York, 1886–1889
- Frederick Cook (Australian politician) (1883–1971), Victorian state politician
- Frederick Cook (cricketer) (1870–1915), South African cricketer
- F. N. Cook (Frederick Norton Cook, 1905–1985), Australian naval officer
- Sir Frederick Cook, 2nd Baronet (1844–1920), British textiles trader and Conservative Party politician
- Bun Cook (Frederick Joseph Cook, 1903–1988), Canadian ice hockey player and coach

== See also ==
- Fred Cook (disambiguation)
- Frederic Cook (disambiguation)
