= Walter Cook =

Walter Cook may refer to:

- Walter Cook (VC) (1834–c. 1864), English recipient of the Victoria Cross for service in India during the Indian Mutiny
- Walter Cook (architect) (1846–1916), American architect of New York firm Babb, Cook & Willard
- Walter Cook (footballer) (1894–1973), English football goalkeeper
- Walter E. Cook (1888–1955), Wisconsin state assemblyman
- Walter William Spencer Cook (1888–1962), American art historian and professor

== See also ==
- Walter Cooke (disambiguation)
