= Don Cook (organist) =

R. Don Cook is the organ area coordinator and the university carillonneur at Brigham Young University (BYU).

Cook has bachelor's and master's degrees in organ from BYU. He has a DMA from the University of Kansas. Prior to joining the BYU faculty he was an organist at Christ Church, Cranbrook in Bloomfield Hills, Michigan and at First United Methodist Church in Lubbock, Texas.

Cook developed the Organ Tutor: Organ 101 program, a multi-media program that has been used to teach organ in multiple countries. His course plans were also used as the basis for a program began in 2003 at the University of Utah.

Cook has been a member of the BYU faculty since 1991. He has directed the BYU Organ Workshop since its founding in 2002. In 2025, Cook Retired as Head of the Organ Department at Brigham Young University.

Besides being the official player of the Bell Tower at BYU, Cook was also involved with selecting the bell used in the old Brigham Young Academy building when it was refurbished into the Provo City Library at Academy Square. His playing of the Bell Tower at BYU has been featured as part of Provo's Freedom Festival. Many of the works Cook plays on the BYU carillon are his own compositions.

Cook retired in 2025

Cook and his wife Kim live in Spanish Fork, Utah. They are the parents of six children.

== Sources ==
- Salt Lake City American Guild of Organist bio of Cook
- BYU bio
- Church News March 14, 2009 article about Cook's organ endeavors
- Mormon Times Y. music professor uses podcasts to help new organists
- BYU Magazine Spring 2009 article about Cook's playing the bells at BYU
- June 28, 2007 Deseret News article about BYU's carrillon
- USA Today Dec. 13, 2004
