= Ted Cook =

Ted Cook may refer to:

- Ted Cook (basketball) (1921–1990), American professional basketball player
- Ted Cook (footballer) (Edward Cook, 1901–1957), association football player who represented New Zealand
- Ted Cook (American football) (1922–2006), American player in the National Football League

== See also ==
- Theodore Cook (disambiguation)
- Edward Cook (disambiguation)
