= Christopher Cook (artist) =

British painter

Christopher Cook (born 1959) is a British painter known for works since 1998 in graphite powder and resin, which have been exhibited in, and collected by, several major museums, predominantly in the USA.

== Work ==
Cook's works since 1998/9 have been almost exclusively monochromatic, painted and drawn in graphite powder suspended in resin and oil, onto coated papers, aluminium sheet, or linen. The surfaces of what he terms ‘graphites’ are extremely thin, and involve much reworking but almost no layering. The images have considerable range in terms of subject matter. Formal connections to Daguerreotype, Photorealism, lithography and Surrealism have been noted in reviews

In some works, especially those arising from an Arts Council residency at Eden Project, there is a strongly microscopic component, emphasized by the intricacy of the graphite surfaces, and sometimes linked to Baroque architecture.

Cook is represented by Mary Ryan Gallery, New York. He is also a writer, and has published a number of artist books and collections of poems, and has also contributed catalogue essays, exhibition and book reviews.

== Career ==
Studied: 1979-81 BA English Literature & Fine Art, Exeter University (University poetry prize). 1983-86 MA Painting, Royal College of Art.

First solo show at Camden Arts Centre in 1985. Awarded Italian Government scholarship in 1986 and moved to Italy for three years. During this time his strongly coloured, symbolic work received curatorial attention, and was included in the exhibitions Eros in Albion at the Casa Massaccio, and in da Bacon a oggi, Palazzo Vecchio Florence.

In 1991/2 he was Guest Artist to the Stadelschule Frankfurt-am-Main, Germany, and the following year was Visiting Fellow at Ruskin School, Oxford University. In 1994/5 he was Distinguished Visiting Artist to California State University, Long Beach, USA.

From 1995 to 1997 he made three extended visits to India, working mainly on texts, sand drawings and an artist's book. On returning to the UK he made the first of his monochromatic ‘graphites’, and has rarely used colour since. He attributes the change to experiences in India, the influence of the sand drawings, and the benefits of grayscale to the imagination. He has lectured extensively in the UK, the US, and the Netherlands. In 1998 he was appointed Reader in Painting at the University of Plymouth.

A graphite was selected for John Moores 2014, and another was a prizewinner at John Moores 21. In 2017 he was first prizewinner (Valeria Sykes Award) in the biennial New Light exhibition, touring four venues in the UK. In 2019 he won the Sunny Art Prize, London/Shanghai.

== Exhibitions ==
Solo shows (graphite works)

- 2019 York Art Gallery, as part of "Making a Masterpiece: Bouts and Beyond"
- 2018 Ryan Lee Gallery, New York
- 2018 Shandong University, China
- 2015 Huebner and Huebner, Frankfurt-am-Main, Germany
- 2014 Art First, London
- 2013 Ryan Lee, New York
- 2011 Langgeng Foundation, Jogjakarta, Indonesia
- 2009 Fine Art Society, London
- 2008 Mary Ryan Gallery
- 2007 Today Art Museum, Beijing
- 2005 Yokohama Museum of Art, Japan
- 2004 Art Museum, University of Memphis, USA
- 2003 Eden Project, Cornwall, UK
- 2001 Ferens Museum, Hull, UK; Towner Gallery, Eastbourne
- 2000 Heidelberger Kunstverein, Germany

Selected group exhibitions (graphite works):

- 2018 Layers of Visibility, NiMAC, Nicosia
- 2017 A Different Way of Painting, curated by Tony Godfrey, Langgeng Foundation, Yogyakarta, Indonesia
- 2014 John Moores, Liverpool
- 2012 Graphite, GV Art, London; Amalgam, Mary Ryan Gallery, New York
- 2011 ICA Singapore; Drawings for the New Century, Minneapolis Museum of Art, USA; Grey, Fitzwilliam Museum, Cambridge
- 2010 Dust on the Mirror, Djanogly Gallery, Nottingham, UK
- 2009 Leaded, Salina Art Gallery, Kansas, USA
- 2006 Until it Makes Sense, Gallery Seventeen, London; Thaddeus Ropac Gallery, Paris
- 2005 Yale Center for British Art, USA; Cleveland Museum, USA
- 2003 East of Eden, Spacex Gallery, Exeter

== Collections ==
Allen Memorial Art Museum, USA; British Museum, UK; Bundanon Trust, Australia; Cleveland Museum USA; Contemporary Arts Society UK; Fitzwilliam Museum Cambridge UK; Haugesund Art Gallery Norway; Hereford Museum, UK; Metropolitan Museum New York USA; Minneapolis Institute of Art USA; MIMA, Middlesbrough, UK; Today Art Museum Beijing, China; University of Exeter, UK; Yale Center for British Art, USA; Yokohama Museum of Art, Japan;

== Recent Awards ==
- 2001 Arts Council England Residency, Eden Project Cornwall UK
- 2005 Daiwa Award, Yokohama Triennial
- 2005 AHRC award, Yokohama Triennial
- 2006 British Council Award, Beijing
- 2011 Residency, Langgeng Foundation, Jogjakarta, Indonesia
- 2013 Bogliasco Foundation Scholarship, Italy
- 2017 Nicosia Municipal Art Gallery Residency
- 2017 New Light Exhibition First Prizewinner (Valeria Sykes Award)
- 2019 Sunny Art Prize, First Prizewinner London/Shanghai

== Sources/external links ==
- "Christopher Cook - startpage". www.christophercook.cc.
- "From Beijing to the Big Apple for artist Christopher Cook". Archived from the original on 9 June 2012.
- "Home | Art First". www.artfirst.co.uk.
- "World Wide Arts Resources | Art Marketing For Artists | Learn To Sell Your Art". www.absolutearts.com.
- "Christopher Cook". www.artinamericamagazine.com.
- "Home - RYAN LEE Gallery". ryanleegallery.com.
