= Geoff Cook (Australian cricketer) =

Australian cricketer

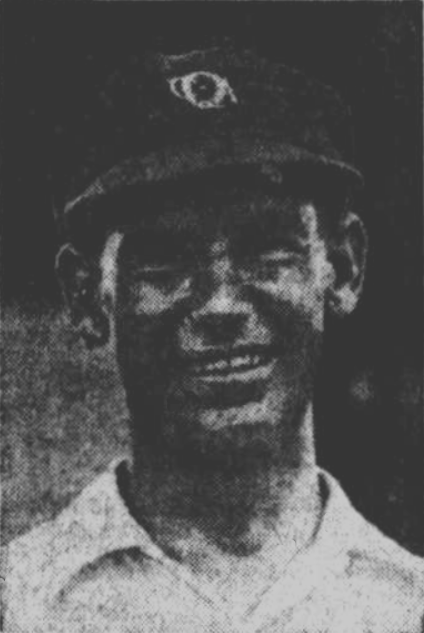

Personal information
- Born: 29 June 1910; Chelmer, Queensland, Australia
- Died: 12 September 1982 (aged 72); Chelmer, Queensland, Australia
- Source: Cricinfo, 1 October 2020

Geoff Cook (29 June 1910 – 12 September 1982) was an Australian cricketer. He played in 68 first-class matches for Queensland between 1931 and 1948.

== See also ==
- List of Queensland first-class cricketers
