= Alistair Cook =

Alistair Cook may refer to:

- Alastair Cook (born 1984), English cricketer
- Ali Cook, real name Alistair Cook, magician and actor
- Alistair Cooke (1908–2004), journalist and broadcaster
- Alistair Cooke, Baron Lexden (born 1945), British historian, author and politician
