= Tim Cook (disambiguation) =

Tim Cook (born 1960) is an American business executive who is the former CEO of Apple Inc.

Tim or Timothy Cook may also refer to:

- Tim Cook (footballer) (born 1974), former Australian Football League player
- Tim Cook (historian) (1971–2025), Canadian military historian and author
- Tim Cook, 2016 Republican Party presidential candidate in several states
- Timothy E. Cook (1954–2006), American scholar of mass communications
