= Mary Cook =

Mary Cook may refer to:

== People ==
- Dame Mary Cook (1863–1950), wife of Australian prime minister Sir Joseph Cook
- Mary N. Cook (born 1951), American religious leader of the Young Women in the LDS Church
- Mary Pilcher-Cook (born 1954), American politician, member of the Kansas Senate
- Mary Virginia Cook Parrish (1862–1945), American educator, public speaker, and Black Baptist women's leader
- Mary Alexander Cook (1902–1981), museum curator and expert on Cape Dutch architecture
- Mary Curnock Cook (born 1958), British academic administrator
- Mary Elizabeth Cook (1863–1951), American artist
- Mary Ellen Cook (born 1980), American film star Mary Carey who ran for California governor in 2003

== Other ==
- Mary Cook, original name of American screw steamer USS Narcissus (1863)
- Mary L. Cook Public Library in Waynesville, Ohio
