= Stephen Cook (disambiguation) =

Stephen Cook is a computer scientist.

Stephen Cook may also refer to:

- Stephen Cook (cricketer) (born 1982), cricketer
- Stephen Lloyd Cook, Old Testament scholar and professor

== See also ==
- Stephen Cooke (born 1983), British footballer
- Steven Cook, British artist, photographer, and graphic designer.
- Steve Cook (disambiguation)
- Jimmy Cook (Stephen James Cook, born 1953), South African sportsperson
