= Vivian Cook =

Vivian Cook may refer to:

- Vivian Cook (linguist) (1940–2021), English linguist
- Vivian E. Cook (born 1937), American politician
- Vivian E. J. Cook (1889–1977) American educator and activist
