= Allan Cook (footballer) =

Australian rules footballer

Personal information
- Full name: Allan Cook
- Born: 19 March 1941 (age 85)
- Original team: Birchip
- Height: 180 cm (5 ft 11 in)
- Weight: 79 kg (174 lb)

Playing career^{1}
| Years | Club | Games (Goals) |
| 1960 | Geelong | 10 (24) |
- ^{1} Playing statistics correct to the end of 1960.

Allan Cook (born 19 March 1941) is a former Australian rules footballer who played for the Geelong Football Club in the Victorian Football League (VFL).
