= Terry Cook =

Terry Cook may refer to:

- Terry Cook (archivist) (1947–2014), Canadian archivist and scholar in archival studies
- Terry Cook (racing driver) (born 1968), American former stock car driver
- Terry Cook (rugby league, born 1965) (born 1965), Australian former rugby league player
- Terry Cook (rugby, born 1927) (1927–2016), Welsh rugby union and rugby league player

== See also ==
- Terry Cooke (born 1976), English footballer
- Terry Cooke (footballer, born 1962)
