= Fred Cook =

Fred Cook may refer to:

- Fred Cook (American football) (born 1952), American football player for the Baltimore Colts
- Fred Cook (Australian footballer, born 1922) (1922–1984), Australian rules footballer who played with the Richmond Football Club
- Fred Cook (Australian footballer, born 1947) (1947–2022), Australian rules footballer who played with Footscray and Port Melbourne
- Fred Cook (footballer, born 1880) (1880–1934), English goalkeeper for Northampton Town, West Bromwich Albion and Portsmouth, fl. 1900s
- Fred Cook (politician) (1858–1943), mayor of Ottawa
- Fred Cook (Welsh footballer) (1902–1966), Wales international footballer
- Fred J. Cook (1911–2003), American investigative journalist
- Bun Cook (1903–1988), real name Fred Cook, ice hockey player

== See also ==
- Frederick Cook (disambiguation)
- Frederic Cook (disambiguation)
