= Frank Cook (Australian footballer) =

Australian rules footballer

Personal information
- Full name: Frank Cook
- Born: 21 September 1916
- Died: 10 July 1973 (aged 56)
- Height: 175 cm (5 ft 9 in)
- Weight: 80 kg (176 lb)

Playing career^{1}
Years	Club	Games (Goals)
1938	South Melbourne	1 (1)
- ^{1} Playing statistics correct to the end of 1938.

Frank Cook (21 September 1916 – 10 July 1973) was an Australian rules footballer who played with South Melbourne in the Victorian Football League (VFL).
