= Hugh Cook (Canadian novelist) =

Canadian novelist

Hugh Cook (born 1942) is a Canadian novelist.

Born in The Hague, Netherlands, his family emigrated to Canada in 1950, settling in Burnaby, British Columbia.

Cook holds degrees from Calvin College, Simon Fraser University and the University of Iowa. In 1982, he joined the English faculty at Redeemer College, now Redeemer University, in Ancaster, Ontario, teaching Canadian, American literature, and creative writing. He retired from full-time teaching in 2005 to devote time to his writing.

Cook's stories have been published in Canada's leading literary journals. His stories in Home in Alfalfa were adapted into a stage play which was performed by the Redeemer University College Theatre Arts department in the fall of 2007. Cook's novel The Homecoming Man has been translated into Dutch under the title Een Man Komt Thuis. His novel Heron River will appear in Dutch translation in 2015 under the title De Tuin van Adam.

Cook lives in Hamilton, Ontario. He gives frequent readings from his work and speaks at writers' conferences.

== Bibliography ==
- Cracked Wheat and Other Stories - 1985 (ISBN 0-88962-265-5)
- The Homecoming Man - 1989 (ISBN 0-88962-428-3)
- Home in Alfalfa - 1998 (ISBN 0-88962-668-5)
- Heron River - 2011 (ISBN 0-88962-940-4)
