= Joyce Cuoco =

American former ballerina

Joyce Cuoco is a former American ballerina. She gained recognition at a young age, particularly for her ability to sustain long balances and execute multiple pirouettes. Cuoco received early training from Harriet Hoctor and E. Virginia Williams, the founder of the Boston Ballet. She quickly achieved popular success as a "baby ballerina." In 1966, she appeared on The Ed Sullivan Show and The Danny Kaye Show, and later headlined at Radio City Music Hall. In her performances, she was noted for her smile and technically impressive dancing.

Cuoco later became a soloist with John Cranko's Stuttgart Ballet and remained in Germany for the rest of her career. She currently works as the assistant to Youri Vámos, serving as both assistant to the choreographer and stage manager for many of his full-length ballet productions. In addition, she works at the Ballet of the Deutsche Oper am Rhein in Düsseldorf as the director of the ballet school.
