= Richard Cook (artist 1784–1857) =

English painter (1784–1857)

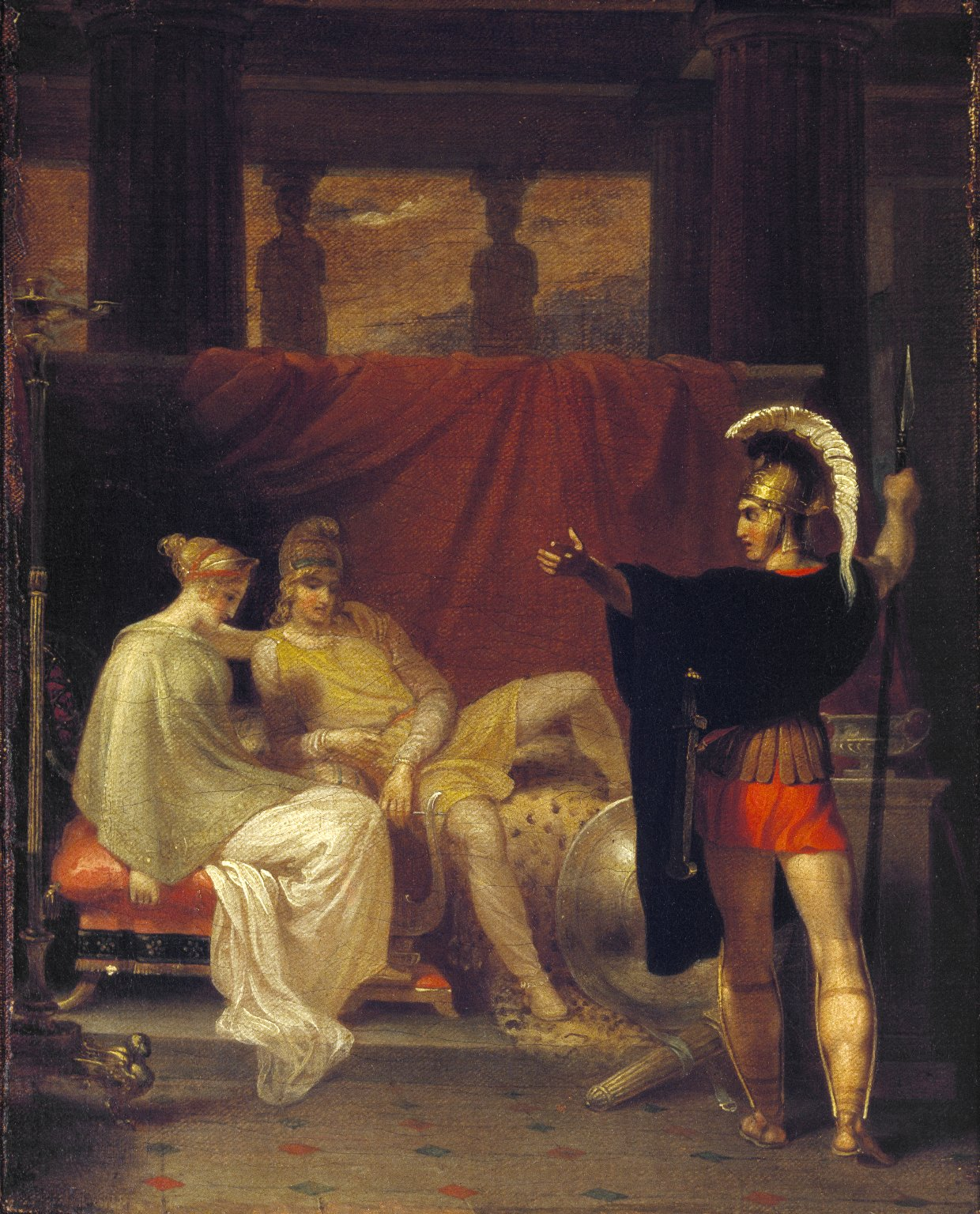
Hector reproving Paris, 1808

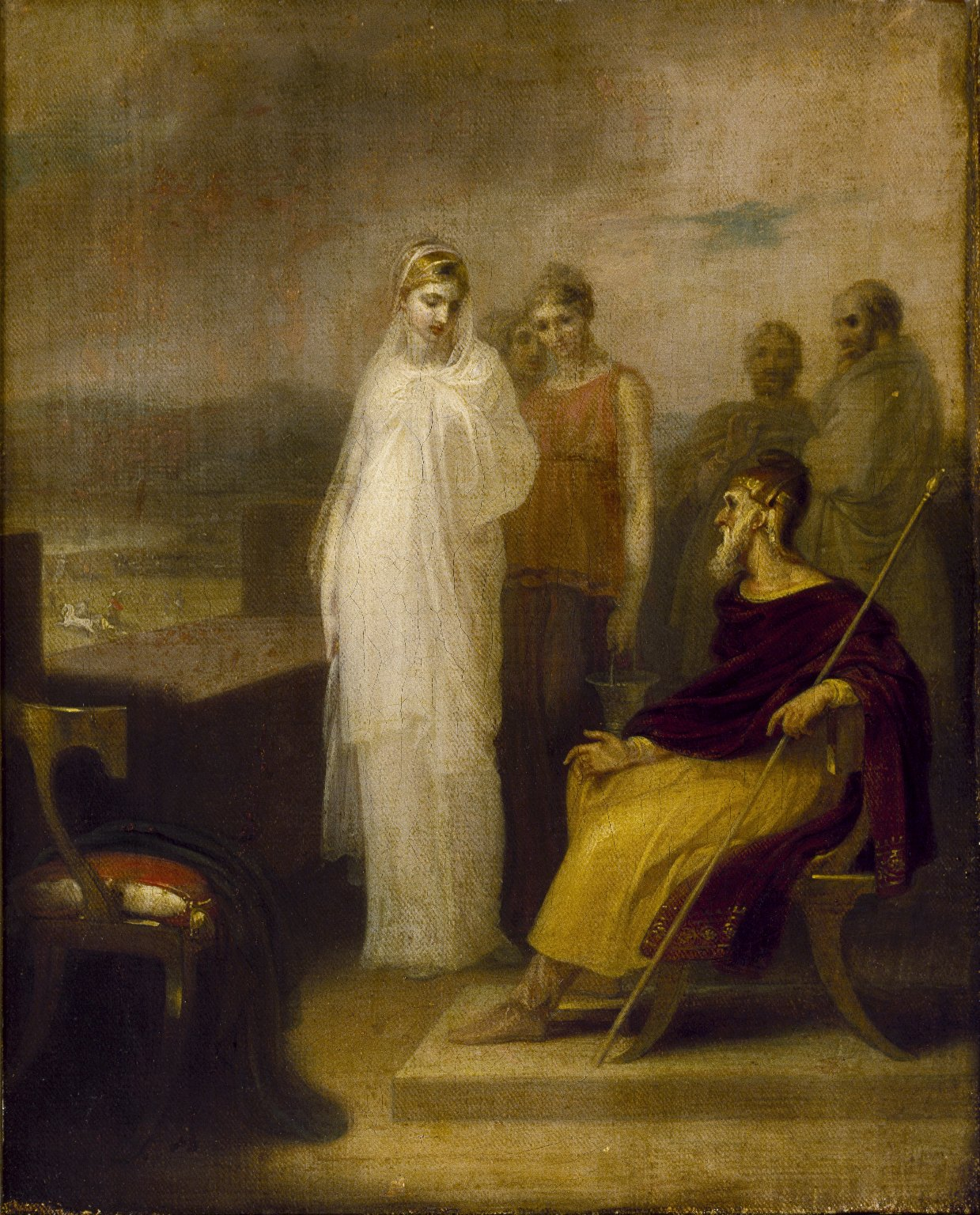
Helen and Priam at the Scaen Gate, 1808

Richard Cook RA (1784 – 11 March 1857) was an English artist.

== Life ==
Cook was born in London in 1784, and entered the schools of the Royal Academy in 1800. He was a constant contributor to the exhibitions from 1808 to 1822, during which time he painted several landscapes, scenes from The Lady of the Lake, and in 1817, having been elected an Associate in the preceding year, a more ambitious work, entitled Ceres, Disconsolate for the Loss of Proserpine. It is now in the collection of the Royal Academy. A contemporary critic described it as "an elegant and well painted illustration of this well known subject", adding that "the architectural accessories are better than English painters are in the habits of using, and are in themselves correct and appropriate"

In 1822 he became a Royal Academician, and almost from that time forward, and certainly for many years preceding his death, he seems to have abandoned painting, and ceased to contribute to the annual exhibitions of the Academy, his private fortune enabling him to live independently of his art. He died in London in 1857.

He illustrated editions of The Lady of the Lake and Gertrude of Wyoming.
