= Cooke =

Origin
- Derivation: Derived from the occupation of cook and anglicisation of various Gaelic names
- Region of origin: England, Ireland

Other names
- Variant forms: Cook, McCook, MacCook, MacCuagh, MacCooge, Mac Dhabhóc, Mac Uag, Mac Cúg

Cooke is a surname of English and Irish origin derived from the occupation of cook and anglicisation of various Gaelic names. Variants include Cook and McCook.

== Irish origin ==
Cooke (rather than Cook) is the usual spelling of the surname in Ireland, where it is found throughout all four provinces. In Connacht, Cooke is the modern anglicized form of the Gaelic name Mac Dhabhóc (also called Mac Uag). In Leinster, it is mainly an occupational name, long established there. In 1465, a law was passed that impacted Gaelic surnames in several counties in Leinster, specifically, Dublin, Meath, Louth and Kildare. The law required that "every Irishman, dwelling betwixt or amongst Englishmen... shall take to him an English surname of one town, as Sutton, Chester, Trim, Skryne, Cork, Kinsale; or colour, as white, black, browne; or art or science, as smith or carpenter; or office, as cooke, butler...". In Ulster, many Cookes descend from the MacCooks (MacCuagh) of Kintyre, a branch of the Clan MacDonald.

The surname was distributed throughout Ireland in the mid-nineteenth century. The highest numbers of Cooke households were found in counties Cavan, Galway, and Armagh, reflecting a strong presence in both Connacht and Ulster. Other areas, such as counties Cork and Tipperary, also had significant numbers of households. Below is the detailed distribution of Cooke households by county:

Distribution of Cooke households in Ireland (mid-19th century)
Cavan: 61	Offaly: 18
Galway: 51	Leitrim: 17
Armagh: 45	Fermanagh: 15
Tyrone: 43	Down: 13
Tipperary: 40	Laois: 12
Antrim: 34	Monaghan: 11
Cork: 34	Kildare: 10
Derry: 32	Waterford: 9
Westmeath: 31	Louth: 8
Kilkenny: 30	Wicklow: 6
Donegal: 26	Kerry: 6
Limerick: 26	Longford: 6
Wexford: 26	Carlow: 6
Dublin: 25	Mayo: 3
Sligo: 24	Roscommon: 3
Meath: 18	

== English origin ==
Cooke is a variant of the more common spelling Cook.

== People ==
- Alec Cooke, Baron Cooke of Islandreagh (1920–2007), Northern Irish politician
- Alexander Cooke (died 1614), English actor
- Alfred Tyrone Cooke, of the Indo-Pakistani wars
- Alistair Cooke (1908–2004), British-American journalist and broadcaster
- Amos Starr Cooke (1810–1871), American educator and businessman in the Kingdom of Hawaii
- Anna Rice Cooke (1853–1934), patron of the arts and founder of the Honolulu Academy of Arts
- Anne Margaret Cooke (1907–1997), African-American stage director and academic
- Anthony Cooke (1505–1576), British scholar
- Aoife Cooke (born 1986), Irish long-distance runner
- Baden Cooke (born 1978), Australian cyclist
- Barrie Cooke (1931–2014), Irish painter
- Bates Cooke (1787–1841), American lawyer, politician and New York State Comptroller
- Benjamin Cooke (1734–1793), British musician
- Beryl Cooke (1906–2001), British actress
- Callie Cooke (born 1993), English actress
- C. R. Cooke (1901–1996), English early Himalayan mountaineer
- Charles Cooke (disambiguation)
- Chauncey H. Cooke (1846–1919), American Civil War soldier
- Christian Cooke (born 1986), English actor
- Clarence Hyde Cooke (1876–1944), businessman in Hawaii
- Dave Cooke, Canadian politician
- Denise D'Ascenzo Cooke (1958–2019), American news anchor
- Derek Cooke (born 1991), American basketball player
- Deryck Cooke (1919–1975), British musicologist
- Doc Cook (Charles L. Cooke, 1891–1958), American jazz bandleader
- Douglas Graham Cooke (1895–1955), British First World War flying ace
- Dusty Cooke (1907–1987), American Major League Baseball player
- Eamonn Cooke (1936–2016) Irish broadcaster and convicted paedophile
- Ebenezer Cooke (art education reformer) (1853–1904), English art master and art education pioneer
- Ebenezer Cooke (poet) (1667–1732), London-born American poet
- Ebenezer Cooke (politician) (1832–1907), Australian accountant and parliamentarian
- Edmund F. Cooke (1885–1967), American politician
- Edward Cooke (disambiguation)
- Emer Cooke (born 1961) Irish pharmacist and executive director of the European Medicines Agency
- Eric Edgar Cooke, Australian murderer
- Francis Cooke (disambiguation)
- Fred Cooke (baseball) (1873–1923), American Major League Baseball player
- Fred Cooke (footballer) (1896–1976), English footballer
- Fred Cooke (comedian) (born 1980), Irish comedian and actor
- Gary Cooke, Irish actor, satirist and writer
- Geoff Cooke (disambiguation)
- George Cooke (disambiguation)
- Gordon Cooke, (born 1975) Irish cricketer
- Henry Cooke (disambiguation)
- H. Basil S. Cooke (1915–2018), Canadian palaeontologist
- Hope Cooke, Queen of Sikkim
- Howard Cooke (1915-2014), Governor General of Jamaica
- Jack Kent Cooke (1912–1997), Canadian entrepreneur
- James Cooke (disambiguation)
- Janet Cooke (born 1954), American journalist who won a Pulitzer Prize for a fabricated story
- Jay Cooke (1821–1905), American financier generally acknowledged as the first major investment banker in the United States and creator of the first wire house firm
- Jennifer Cooke, actress
- Jim Cooke, Irish teacher of maths and physics
- Jimmy Cooke, an African American league baseball player in 1932
- John Cooke (disambiguation)
- John J. Cooke (actor) (1874–1921) American actor
- John William Cooke (1919–1968), Argentine politician and revolutionary
- Joseph Platt Cooke (1730–1816), in American Revolutionary War
- L. J. Cooke (1868–1943), first men's basketball coach at the University of Minnesota
- Lawrence H. Cooke (1914–2000), American lawyer, politician and Chief Judge of New York Court of Appeals
- Logan Cooke (born 1995), American football player
- Lorrin A. Cooke (1831–1902), American politician, governor of Connecticut
- Lloyd Miller Cooke (1916–2001) American chemist and researcher
- Marcia G. Cooke (1954–2023), American jurist
- Martin Cooke (disambiguation)
- Mary Leggett Cooke (1852–1938), American Unitarian minister and member of the Iowa Sisterhood
- Matt or Matthew Cooke (disambiguation)
- Mel Cooke (1934–2013), New Zealand rugby league footballer
- Mick or Michael Cooke (disambiguation)
- Mildred Cooke (1524–1589), English noblewoman and translator
- Mordecai Cubitt Cooke (1825–1914), British botanist
- Nathaniel Cooke (19th century), designer of the standard set of chess figures
- Nelson Cooke (1919–2018), Australian cellist
- Nicole Cooke (born 1983), British cyclist
- Olivia Cooke (born 1993), English actress
- Peter Cooke (Scouting)
- Philip St. George Cooke (1809–1895), 19th century US cavalry officer
- Pinny Cooke (1923–2004), New York politician, assemblywoman from Rochester
- Ricky Cooke (born 1969), Australian racewalker
- Robin Cooke, Baron Cooke of Thorndon, New Zealand judge
- Rose Terry Cooke (1827–1892), American author, poet
- Ross Cooke (born 1988), English professional wrestler
- Sam Cooke (1931–1964), American singer/songwriter
- Samuel Cooke (disambiguation)
- Sarah Cooke (died 1688), English actress
- Sasha Cooke, American mezzo-soprano
- Senan Cooke (born 1945), Irish hurler
- Sidney Cooke (born 1927), paedophile and child killer
- Steve Cooke (baseball) (born 1970), baseball player
- Suzette Cooke (born 1949), American politician
- Tadhg Cooke, Irish musician
- Terence Cooke (1921–1983), Irish-American cardinal and Archbishop of New York
- Theodore Cooke (1836–1910), Anglo-Irish engineer and botanist active in India
- Thomas Cooke (disambiguation), several people
- Thomas Simpson Cooke (1782–1848), Irish composer
- Tommy Cooke (1914–2014), Irish hurler and Gaelic footballer
- Trish Cooke (born 1962), children's TV presenter, author and playwright
- Ultan Cooke, Irish chef
- Walter E. Cooke (1910–1982), New York politician
- Walter H. Cooke (1838–1909), American recipient of the Medal of Honor
- Weldon B. Cooke (1884–1914), American pioneer aviator
- Wells Cooke (1858–1916), American ornithologist
- Wequash Cooke (died 1642), one of the earliest Native American converts to Protestant Christianity and Pequot sagamore
- William Cooke (disambiguation)
- Wilson Cooke (1819–1887), American politician and merchant
- Zia Cooke (born 2001), American basketball player

== Fictional characters ==
- Caitlin Cooke, main character from the Canadian animated television series 6teen
- Ebenezer Cooke, a fictional version of the poet, protagonist of John Barth's 1960 novel The Sot-Weed Factor
- Sydney "Syd" Cooke, in the American television series Walker, Texas Ranger

== See also ==
- Cook (surname)
- Cookes, surname
