= Billie Geter Thomas =

American educator

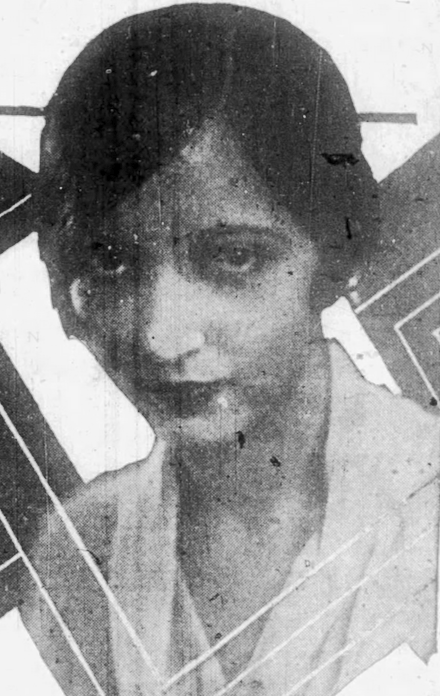
- Thomas, in a 1928 newspaper
- Born: William Bryan Geter; 1902; Jacksonville, Florida, U.S.
- Died: August 15, 1962 (aged 59–60); Gardiner, Maine, U.S.
- Occupations: College professor, actress
- Known for: President of College Language Association (1956)

William "Billie" Bryan Geter Thomas (1902 – August 15, 1962) was an American educator and actress. She was director of dramatics at Bethune-Cookman College, and taught French at Spelman College from 1933 to 1962. In 1956 she was the first woman to serve as president of the College Language Association.

== Early life and education ==
Geter was born in Jacksonville, Florida, the daughter of Wyatt J. Geter and Alice Priestley Geter; her father was an undertaker and her mother graduated from Fisk University. She studied piano as a teen, and attended the Cushing Academy in Massachusetts, graduating in 1925. She graduated from Boston University and Radcliffe College, with further studies at the University of Paris, the University of Nancy, Middlebury College, and the University of Québec. She was a member of Alpha Kappa Alpha sorority.

== Career ==
Geter taught French and was head of the French department at Spelman College, from 1933 to 1962. In 1956, she was the first woman to serve as president of the College Language Association.

Geter Thomas acted in many productions of the Atlanta University Summer Theater and the Atlanta-Morehouse-Spelman Players, working with Anne Cooke Reid, Naomah Maise, Baldwin W. Burroughs, Raphael (Ray) McIver, and Owen Dodson. In 1952 she costarred in WERD radio dramas, The Last in the World and Man or Brute, both by Arch Oboler.

Geter was active in Atlanta's social scene, and was known for her stylish wardrobe. In 1953 and 1955 she was named to Ebony magazine's best-dressed lists.

== Publications ==
- "France and the Traditions of Freedom" (1943, with Ira De Augustine Reid)
- "Humanism and the Teaching of Languages" (1957)
- "The Ungrateful Negro in France" (1961, with Shelby T. McCloy)

== Personal life ==
Geter married William Charles Thomas in 1939. Her husband died in 1951, and she died in 1962, in a car accident in Maine. Her colleague Helen Coulbourn also died in the crash. Albert E. Manley, the president of Spelman College, spoke at their memorial service on campus.
