= Charles Cook =

Charles Cook may refer to:

== Sportsmen ==
- Charles Cook (footballer, born 1898) (1898–?), Scottish footballer
- Charles Cook (footballer, born 1972), Welsh footballer and manager
- Charlie Cook (wrestler), retired American professional wrestler
- Charlie Cook (ice hockey) (born 1982), American ice hockey defenseman

== Others ==
- Charles Cook (New York politician) (1800–1866), New York businessman and politician
- Charles Cook (dancer) (1914–1991), tap dancer
- Charles A. Cook (died 1878), mayor of Denver, Colorado, 1861–1863
- Charles D. Cook (1935–2001), New York politician
- Chuck Cook (Charles Henry Cook, 1926–1993), Canadian radio talk show host and member of parliament
- Charles Cook (academic) (1843–1910), New Zealand mathematician
- Charlie Cook (born 1953), American pollster founded the political newsletter Cook Political Report
- Vince Cook (Charle Cook, 1946–2020), Kansas politician

== See also ==
- Charles Cooke (disambiguation)
- Charlie Cooke (born 1942), Scottish footballer
