= Samuel Cooke =

Samuel or Sam Cooke may refer to:

- Samuel Cooke (Australian politician) (1847–1929)
- Sam Cooke (1931–1964), American singer
- Samuel Cooke (judge) (1912–1978), English judge
- Sam Cooke (model) (born 1985), English glamour model
- Sam Cooke (Australian footballer) (1883–1966), Australian rules footballer
- S. S. Cooke (Samuel Stephen Cooke Sr., 1879–1944), college football coach
- S. N. Cooke (Samuel Nathaniel Cooke Jr., 1883–1964), English architect
- Samuel Cooke and Co, oil and fuel delivery and manufacture service
- Sir Samuel Cooke, 1st Baronet (c. 1690–1758), Anglo-Irish politician

== See also ==
- Samuel Cook (disambiguation)
- Cooke (surname)
- Sam Koch, pronounced the same way
