= James McGowan =

James McGowan may refer to:

- James McGowan (actor) (born 1960), Canadian actor
- James McGowan (mathematician), recipient of the Charles Cook Memorial Prize
- James McGowan (politician) (1841–1912), New Zealand politician
- James M. McGowan (1920–2004), member of the New Jersey General Assembly
- Jamie McGowan (disambiguation)
- Jimmy McGowan (footballer, born 1916) (1916–1989), Scottish international footballer who played for Partick Thistle FC
- Jimmy McGowan (footballer, born 1924) (1924–1984), Scottish footballer who played for Southampton FC

== See also ==
- James McGowen (disambiguation)
