= Naomah Maise =

American educator

- Maise, from a 1948 newspaper
- Born: Naomah Bernard Williams; December 5, 1906; Chattanooga, Tennessee, U.S.
- Died: June 15, 1974 (aged 67); California, U.S.
- Occupations: Singer, college professor, clubwoman, social worker

Naomah Bernard Williams Maise (December 5, 1906 – June 13, 1974) was an American singer, educator, and social worker. She taught piano and voice at Spelman College, and was director of Friendly Inn, a settlement house in Cleveland. In 1953, she was named national executive director of the National Council of Negro Women.

== Early life and education ==
Maise was born in Chattanooga, Tennessee and raised in Anniston, Alabama, the daughter of James Henry Williams and Blanche Bernard Reese Williams. She graduated from Spelman College in 1932, studied music at Juilliard in 1933 on a Rockefeller scholarship, and earned a master's degree from Western Reserve University.

== Career ==
Maise was a soprano concert singer and taught piano and voice at Spelman College. One of her voice students at Spelman was Mattiwilda Dobbs. In 1940 she was one of the soloists at the Bennington Music Festival. She also acted in early theatrical productions at Atlanta University, working with her husband Fred Maise, director Anne Cooke Reid, and her Spelman colleague Billie Geter Thomas.

From 1948 to 1952 Maise was the first Black director of Friendly Inn, a settlement house in Cleveland. In 1953 she was named national executive director of the National Council of Negro Women. In that role, she submitted written testimony to a Senate hearing on desegregation and the construction of school facilities. In 1954, she was considered for an advisory role on the staff of HEW Secretary Oveta Culp Hobby. In 1960 she was program director of a senior center and taught piano lessons there. She was active in Cleveland's chapter of the Spelman College alumnae association.
