= Samuel Cook =

Samuel Cook may refer to:

- Samuel Cook (artist) (1806–1859), English watercolour painter
- Samuel Cook (Chartist) (1786–1861)
- Samuel A. Cook (1849–1918), U.S. representative from Wisconsin
- Samuel Albert Cook (1878–1915), medical doctor and member of the American Red Cross mission in Serbia
- Sam C. Cook (1855–1924), Mississippi Supreme Court justice
- Samuel DuBois Cook (1928–2017), political scientist and professor
- Samuel E. Cook (1860–1946), U.S. representative from Indiana
- Samuel Edward Cook (1787–1856), English writer
- Samuel Edward-Cook (born 1990), English actor
- Samuel H. Cook, United States Army officer of the Civil War
- J. Samuel Cook (born 1983), African-American playwright, journalist and writer

== See also ==
- Sam Cook (disambiguation)
- Samuel Cooke (disambiguation)
- Cook (surname)
