= Fred Cooke =

Fred Cooke may refer to:

- Fred Cooke (baseball) (1873–1923), American Major League Baseball player
- Fred Cooke (footballer) (1896–1976), English footballer
- Fred Cooke (comedian) (born 1980), Irish comedian and actor

== See also ==
- Frederick Cooke, Australian politician
- Frederick Cooke (socialist), New Zealand tailor, socialist and trade unionist
