= 2009–10 Premier League =

Football season in England

Premier League
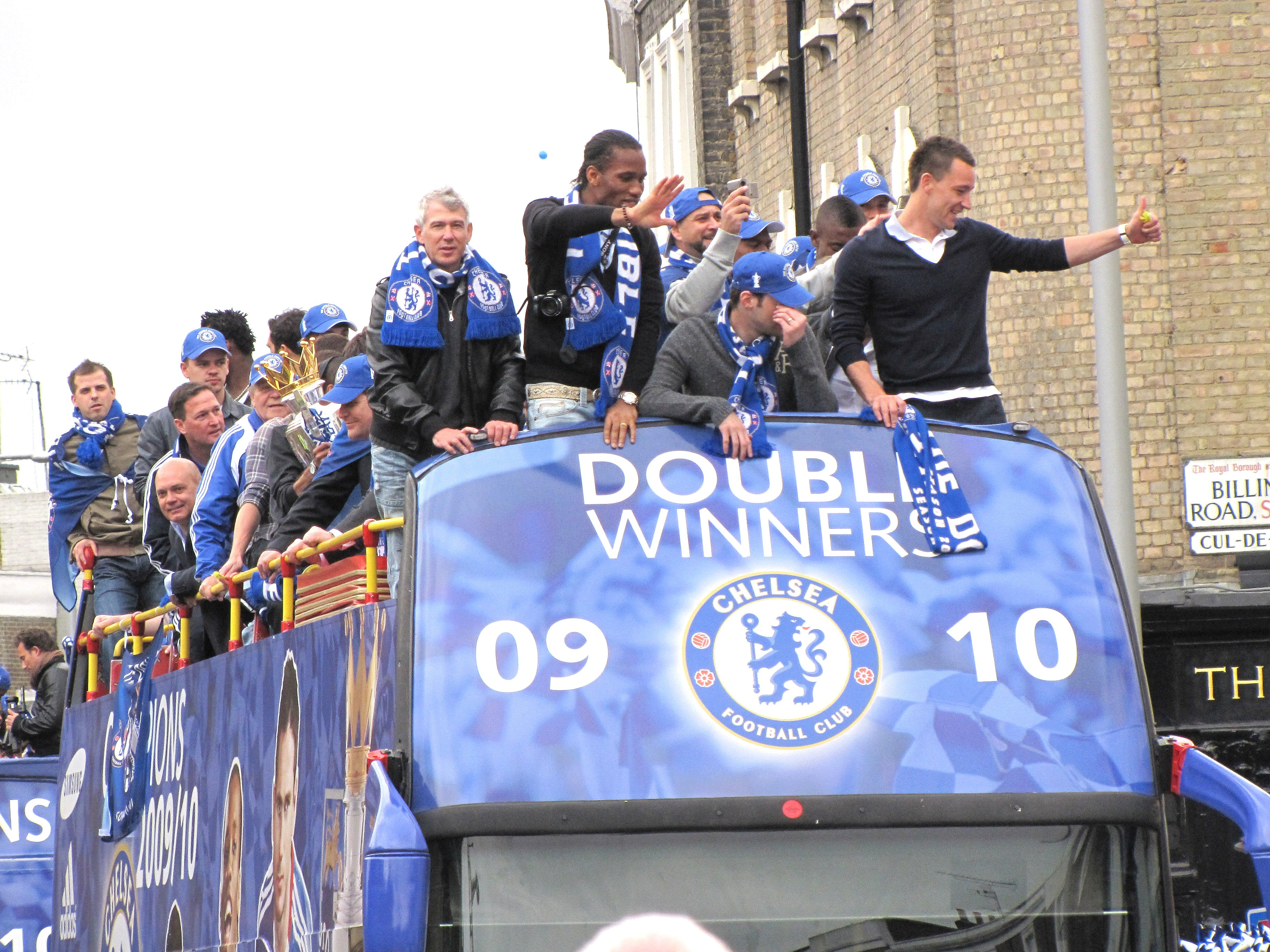
- Season: 2009–10
- Dates: 15 August 2009 – 9 May 2010
- Champions: Chelsea; 3rd Premier League title 4th English title
- Relegated: Burnley; Hull City; Portsmouth
- Champions League: Chelsea; Manchester United; Arsenal; Tottenham Hotspur
- Europa League: Manchester City; Aston Villa; Liverpool
- Matches: 380
- Goals: 1,053 (2.77 per match)
- Top goalscorer: Didier Drogba (29 goals)
- Best goalkeeper: Petr Čech (17 clean sheets)
- Biggest home win: Tottenham Hotspur 9–1 Wigan Athletic (22 November 2009); Chelsea 8–0 Wigan Athletic (9 May 2010)
- Biggest away win: Everton 1–6 Arsenal (15 August 2009); Wigan Athletic 0–5 Manchester United (22 August 2009); Portsmouth 0–5 Chelsea (24 March 2010); Burnley 1–6 Manchester City (3 April 2010)
- Highest scoring: Tottenham Hotspur 9–1 Wigan Athletic (22 November 2009)
- Longest winning run: 6 games Arsenal; Chelsea
- Longest unbeaten run: 12 games Birmingham City
- Longest winless run: 14 games Sunderland
- Longest losing run: 7 games Portsmouth
- Highest attendance: 75,316; Manchester United 4–0 Stoke City (9 May 2010)
- Lowest attendance: 14,323; Wigan Athletic 0–0 Portsmouth (14 April 2010)
- Total attendance: 12,977,252
- Average attendance: 34,150

The 2009–10 Premier League (known as the Barclays Premier League for sponsorship reasons) was the 18th season of the Premier League since its establishment in 1992. A total of 20 teams competed in the league, with Chelsea unseating the three-time defending champions Manchester United, scoring a then Premier League record 103 goals in the process. The season began on 15 August 2009 and concluded on 9 May 2010. Prior to each opening week match, a minute's applause was held in memory of Sir Bobby Robson. Nike provided a new match ball – the T90 Ascente – for this season. Barclays sponsored the league.

The race for the title went to the final day of the season with Chelsea one point ahead of Manchester United; Chelsea's 8–0 win over Wigan Athletic was enough to secure their first title since 2006, despite Manchester United's 4–0 defeat of Stoke City. The title win came in Chelsea manager Carlo Ancelotti's first season at the club and he followed this up a week later by securing Chelsea's first FA Cup and League double with a win over Portsmouth at Wembley. Chelsea striker Didier Drogba won the Golden Boot award as the league's top goalscorer for the second time. The victorious Chelsea side were noted for their attacking style of football: the team averaged 2.71 goals per game, scoring a Premier League record 103 goals for the season, compared to the average of 1.89 when they won the title in the 2004–05 and 2005–06 seasons.

In February 2010, Portsmouth became the first club to go into administration whilst a member of the Premier League. They were docked nine points, and two months later they were the first team of the season to be relegated. Hull City and Premier League debutants Burnley were relegated alongside them.

An independent commission later found that Manchester City breached Premier League financial rules during this season, part of a pattern of breaches spanning 2009-2018.

== Overview ==
=== Pre-season ===
Pre-season was overshadowed by the death of Sir Bobby Robson on 31 July. On the opening games of the season, players stood around the centre circle for a minute's applause for the former Newcastle United, Fulham, Ipswich Town, Barcelona, Porto, PSV and England manager who died at the age of 76.

=== Broadcasting ===
This season was the last of a three-year domestic television rights deal agreed in 2006. Television rights continue to provide a large portion of Premier League clubs' revenue. However, on 19 June 2009, the Premier League annulled its contract with Ireland-based broadcaster Setanta Sports after the company failed to pay an instalment to the league with speculation mounting that the company would enter administration. As a result, Setanta Sports' share was bought by United States–based broadcasters ESPN, while Sky Sports continue to hold four of the six 23-live match packages. In the United States, the Disney-owned network is making use of sibling-network ESPN2 to televise early Saturday matches and Monday matches. This was possible due to Setanta Sports' financial troubles, which required their US-based North America division to sell its rights to those games back to Fox Sports International, who in turn sublicensed them to ESPN. Setanta continues to broadcast a reduced number of matches in Ireland. In Australia, most games are available live on Fox Sports. Sentanta Sports USA operations ceased on 28 February, and Fox Soccer Plus replaced Sentanta as a pay service the following day.

On 31 January 2010, Sky Sports broadcast the match between Arsenal and Manchester United in 3D. The 3D broadcast was shown at nine pubs in London, Manchester, Cardiff, Edinburgh and Dublin, making the match the first sports event to be televised in 3D to a public audience anywhere in the world.

=== Final results ===
Chelsea won the league by a point over second placed Manchester United on 9 May 2010, with an 8–0 win at home to Wigan Athletic. They won despite Manchester United's 4–0 win against Stoke. The title win came in Chelsea manager Carlo Ancelotti's first season with the club. Portsmouth were the first team to be relegated on 10 April 2010, followed by Hull City and Burnley. Fulham's manager Roy Hodgson was voted manager of the year by the League Managers Association. The season saw Liverpool, runners-up the previous season and considered one of the established 'Big Four', finish outside the top four for the first time since 2004–05 leaving them unable to compete in the UEFA Champions League for the first time since the 2003–04 season. Tottenham Hotspur finished with their best point total at the time in the Premier League era, finishing in fourth place on 70 points, earning their first ever berth into the Champions league.

== Teams ==
Twenty teams competed in the league – the top seventeen teams from the previous season and the three teams promoted from the Championship. The promoted teams were Wolverhampton Wanderers, Birmingham City and Burnley returning to the top flight after absences of five, one and thirty-three years respectively. This was also Burnley's first season in the Premier League. They replaced Newcastle United, Middlesbrough and West Bromwich Albion, who were relegated to the Championship after their top flight spells of sixteen, eleven and one year respectively.

=== Stadiums and locations ===
Locations of the 2009–10 Premier League teams
Greater London Premier League football clubs
Greater Manchester Premier League football clubs
West Midlands Premier League football clubs

Team	Location	Stadium	Capacity
Arsenal	London (Holloway)	Emirates Stadium	60,355
Aston Villa	Birmingham (Aston)	Villa Park	42,788
Birmingham City	Birmingham (Bordesley)	St Andrew's	30,009
Blackburn Rovers	Blackburn	Ewood Park	31,367
Bolton Wanderers	Bolton	Reebok Stadium	28,723
Burnley	Burnley	Turf Moor	22,546
Chelsea	London (Fulham)	Stamford Bridge	42,055
Everton	Liverpool (Walton)	Goodison Park	40,157
Fulham	London (Fulham)	Craven Cottage	25,700
Hull City	Kingston upon Hull	KC Stadium	25,404
Liverpool	Liverpool (Anfield)	Anfield	45,276
Manchester City	Manchester (Bradford)	City of Manchester Stadium	55,097
Manchester United	Trafford (Old Trafford)	Old Trafford	76,212
Portsmouth	Portsmouth	Fratton Park	20,688
Stoke City	Stoke-on-Trent	Britannia Stadium	28,383
Sunderland	Sunderland	Stadium of Light	49,000
Tottenham Hotspur	London (Tottenham)	White Hart Lane	36,240
West Ham United	London (Upton Park)	Boleyn Ground	35,309
Wigan Athletic	Wigan	DW Stadium (Note: Wigan Athletic announced that from the 2009–10 season onward, the JJB Stadium would be renamed to the DW Stadium.)	25,138
Wolverhampton Wanderers	Wolverhampton	Molineux Stadium	29,303

=== Personnel and kits ===
(as of 9 May 2010)

Team	Manager	Captain	Kit manufacturer	Shirt sponsor
Arsenal	(France) Arsène Wenger	(Spain) Cesc Fàbregas	Nike	Emirates
Aston Villa	(Northern Ireland) Martin O'Neill	(Bulgaria) Stiliyan Petrov	Nike	Acorns Children's Hospice
Birmingham City	(Scotland) Alex McLeish	(Republic of Ireland) Stephen Carr	Umbro	F&C Investments
Blackburn Rovers	(England) Sam Allardyce	(New Zealand) Ryan Nelsen	Umbro	Crown Paints
Bolton Wanderers	(Republic of Ireland) Owen Coyle	(England) Kevin Davies	Reebok	188BET
Burnley	(England) Brian Laws	(Scotland) Steven Caldwell	Erreà	Cooke Fuels
Chelsea	(Italy) Carlo Ancelotti	(England) John Terry	Adidas	Samsung
Everton	(Scotland) David Moyes	(England) Phil Neville	Le Coq Sportif	Chang Beer
Fulham	(England) Roy Hodgson	(England) Danny Murphy	Nike	LG Electronics
Hull City	(Northern Ireland) Iain Dowie*	(England) Ian Ashbee	Umbro	Totesport.com
Liverpool	(Spain) Rafael Benítez	(England) Steven Gerrard	Adidas	Carlsberg
Manchester City	(Italy) Roberto Mancini	(Ivory Coast) Kolo Touré	Umbro	Etihad Airways
Manchester United	(Scotland) Sir Alex Ferguson	(England) Gary Neville	Nike	AIG
Portsmouth	(Israel) Avram Grant	(England) David James	Canterbury	Jobsite
Stoke City	(Wales) Tony Pulis	(Senegal) Abdoulaye Faye	Le Coq Sportif	Britannia
Sunderland	(England) Steve Bruce	(Albania) Lorik Cana	Umbro	Boylesports
Tottenham Hotspur	(England) Harry Redknapp	(England) Ledley King	Puma	Mansion
West Ham United	(Italy) Gianfranco Zola	(England) Matthew Upson	Umbro	SBOBET
Wigan Athletic	(Spain) Roberto Martínez	(Netherlands) Mario Melchiot	Vandanel	188BET
Wolverhampton Wanderers	(Republic of Ireland) Mick McCarthy	(England) Karl Henry	Le Coq Sportif	Sportingbet

* – Football Management Consultant

=== Managerial changes ===
Team	Outgoing manager	Manner of departure	Date of vacancy	Table	Incoming manager	Date of appointment
Sunderland	(Scotland) Ricky Sbragia	Resigned	24 May 2009	Pre-season	(England) Steve Bruce	2 June 2009
Chelsea	(Netherlands) Guus Hiddink	End of interim contract	31 May 2009	Pre-season	(Italy) Carlo Ancelotti	1 June 2009
Wigan Athletic	(England) Steve Bruce	Signed by Sunderland	2 June 2009	Pre-season	(Spain) Roberto Martínez	15 June 2009
Portsmouth	(England) Paul Hart	Sacked	24 November 2009	20th	(Israel) Avram Grant	26 November 2009
Manchester City	(Wales) Mark Hughes	Sacked	19 December 2009	6th	(Italy) Roberto Mancini	19 December 2009
Bolton Wanderers	(England) Gary Megson	Sacked	30 December 2009	18th	(Republic of Ireland) Owen Coyle	8 January 2010
Burnley	(Republic of Ireland) Owen Coyle	Signed by Bolton Wanderers	8 January 2010	14th	(England) Brian Laws	13 January 2010
Hull City	(England) Phil Brown	Resigned	15 March 2010	19th	(Northern Ireland) Iain Dowie	17 March 2010

== League table ==
Pos	Team	Pld	W	D	L	GF	GA	GD	Pts	Qualification or relegation
1	Chelsea (C)	38	27	5	6	103	32	+71	86	Qualification for the Champions League group stage
2	Manchester United	38	27	4	7	86	28	+58	85	Qualification for the Champions League group stage
3	Arsenal	38	23	6	9	83	41	+42	75	Qualification for the Champions League group stage
4	Tottenham Hotspur	38	21	7	10	67	41	+26	70	Qualification for the Champions League play-off round
5	Manchester City	38	18	13	7	73	45	+28	67	Qualification for the Europa League play-off round (Note: Since Manchester United won the League Cup and then qualified for the Champions League, their spot in the Europa League was passed down to the 6th-placed team. The 6th-placed Aston Villa was coincidentally also the League Cup runners-up.)
6	Aston Villa	38	17	13	8	52	39	+13	64	Qualification for the Europa League play-off round
7	Liverpool	38	18	9	11	61	35	+26	63	Qualification for the Europa League third qualifying round (Note: Originally Portsmouth qualified for the third qualifying round of the Europa League as the FA Cup runners-up, replacing the winners, Champions League-qualified Chelsea. However, they failed to apply for a UEFA licence. Therefore, Liverpool as the best placed team not qualified for the European competitions took their place.)
8	Everton	38	16	13	9	60	49	+11	61	
9	Birmingham City	38	13	11	14	38	47	−9	50	
10	Blackburn Rovers	38	13	11	14	41	55	−14	50	
11	Stoke City	38	11	14	13	34	48	−14	47	
12	Fulham	38	12	10	16	39	46	−7	46	
13	Sunderland	38	11	11	16	48	56	−8	44	
14	Bolton Wanderers	38	10	9	19	42	67	−25	39	
15	Wolverhampton Wanderers	38	9	11	18	32	56	−24	38	
16	Wigan Athletic	38	9	9	20	37	79	−42	36	
17	West Ham United	38	8	11	19	47	66	−19	35	
18	Burnley (R)	38	8	6	24	42	82	−40	30	Relegation to Football League Championship
19	Hull City (R)	38	6	12	20	34	75	−41	30	Relegation to Football League Championship
20	Portsmouth (R)	38	7	7	24	34	66	−32	19 (Note: Portsmouth were docked nine points for entering administration.)	Relegation to Football League Championship

Source: Barclays Premier League
(C) Champions; (R) Relegated

== Results ==
Home \ Away	ARS	AVL	BIR	BLB	BOL	BUR	CHE	EVE	FUL	HUL	LIV	MCI	MUN	POR	STK	SUN	TOT	WHU	WIG	WOL
Arsenal		3–0	3–1	6–2	4–2	3–1	0–3	2–2	4–0	3–0	1–0	0–0	1–3	4–1	2–0	2–0	3–0	2–0	4–0	1–0
Aston Villa	0–0		1–0	0–1	5–1	5–2	2–1	2–2	2–0	3–0	0–1	1–1	1–1	2–0	1–0	1–1	1–1	0–0	0–2	2–2
Birmingham City	1–1	0–1		2–1	1–2	2–1	0–0	2–2	1–0	0–0	1–1	0–0	1–1	1–0	0–0	2–1	1–1	1–0	1–0	2–1
Blackburn Rovers	2–1	2–1	2–1		3–0	3–2	1–1	2–3	2–0	1–0	0–0	0–2	0–0	3–1	0–0	2–2	0–2	0–0	2–1	3–1
Bolton Wanderers	0–2	0–1	2–1	0–2		1–0	0–4	3–2	0–0	2–2	2–3	3–3	0–4	2–2	1–1	0–1	2–2	3–1	4–0	1–0
Burnley	1–1	1–1	2–1	0–1	1–1		1–2	1–0	1–1	2–0	0–4	1–6	1–0	1–2	1–1	3–1	4–2	2–1	1–3	1–2
Chelsea	2–0	7–1	3–0	5–0	1–0	3–0		3–3	2–1	2–1	2–0	2–4	1–0	2–1	7–0	7–2	3–0	4–1	8–0	4–0
Everton	1–6	1–1	1–1	3–0	2–0	2–0	2–1		2–1	5–1	0–2	2–0	3–1	1–0	1–1	2–0	2–2	2–2	2–1	1–1
Fulham	0–1	0–2	2–1	3–0	1–1	3–0	0–2	2–1		2–0	3–1	1–2	3–0	1–0	0–1	1–0	0–0	3–2	2–1	0–0
Hull City	1–2	0–2	0–1	0–0	1–0	1–4	1–1	3–2	2–0		0–0	2–1	1–3	0–0	2–1	0–1	1–5	3–3	2–1	2–2
Liverpool	1–2	1–3	2–2	2–1	2–0	4–0	0–2	1–0	0–0	6–1		2–2	2–0	4–1	4–0	3–0	2–0	3–0	2–1	2–0
Manchester City	4–2	3–1	5–1	4–1	2–0	3–3	2–1	0–2	2–2	1–1	0–0		0–1	2–0	2–0	4–3	0–1	3–1	3–0	1–0
Manchester United	2–1	0–1	1–0	2–0	2–1	3–0	1–2	3–0	3–0	4–0	2–1	4–3		5–0	4–0	2–2	3–1	3–0	5–0	3–0
Portsmouth	1–4	1–2	1–2	0–0	2–3	2–0	0–5	0–1	0–1	3–2	2–0	0–1	1–4		1–2	1–1	1–2	1–1	4–0	3–1
Stoke City	1–3	0–0	0–1	3–0	1–2	2–0	1–2	0–0	3–2	2–0	1–1	1–1	0–2	1–0		1–0	1–2	2–1	2–2	2–2
Sunderland	1–0	0–2	3–1	2–1	4–0	2–1	1–3	1–1	0–0	4–1	1–0	1–1	0–1	1–1	0–0		3–1	2–2	1–1	5–2
Tottenham Hotspur	2–1	0–0	2–1	3–1	1–0	5–0	2–1	2–1	2–0	0–0	2–1	3–0	1–3	2–0	0–1	2–0		2–0	9–1	0–1
West Ham United	2–2	2–1	2–0	0–0	1–2	5–3	1–1	1–2	2–2	3–0	2–3	1–1	0–4	2–0	0–1	1–0	1–2		3–2	1–3
Wigan Athletic	3–2	1–2	2–3	1–1	0–0	1–0	3–1	0–1	1–1	2–2	1–0	1–1	0–5	0–0	1–1	1–0	0–3	1–0		0–1
Wolverhampton Wanderers	1–4	1–1	0–1	1–1	2–1	2–0	0–2	0–0	2–1	1–1	0–0	0–3	0–1	0–1	0–0	2–1	1–0	0–2	0–2	

Source: Barclays Premier League
Legend: Blue = home team win; Yellow = draw; Red = away team win.

== Season statistics ==
=== Scoring ===
- First goal of the season: 27 minutes and 12 seconds – Stephen Hunt for Hull City against Chelsea (15 August 2009)
- Fastest goal in a match: 36 seconds – Darren Bent for Sunderland against Tottenham Hotspur (3 April 2010)
- Goal scored at the latest point in a match: 90+5 minutes and 48 seconds – Wade Elliott for Burnley against Hull City (10 April 2010)
- First own goal of the season: Stephen Jordan (Burnley) for Stoke City, 32 minutes and 28 seconds (15 August 2009)
- First hat-trick of the season: Jermain Defoe (Tottenham Hotspur) against Hull City (19 August 2009)
- Quickest hat-trick: 6 minutes – Jermain Defoe (Tottenham Hotspur) against Wigan Athletic (22 November 2009)
- Widest winning margin: 8 goals
  - Tottenham Hotspur 9–1 Wigan Athletic (22 November 2009)
  - Chelsea 8–0 Wigan Athletic (9 May 2010)
- Most goals in one half: 9 goals – Tottenham Hotspur 9–1 Wigan Athletic (1–0 at half time) (22 November 2009)
- Most goals in one half by a single team: 8 goals – Tottenham Hotspur 9–1 Wigan Athletic (22 November 2009)
- Most goals scored by losing team: 3 goals –
  - Manchester United 4–3 Manchester City (20 September 2009)
  - West Ham United 5–3 Burnley (28 November 2009)
  - Manchester City 4–3 Sunderland (19 December 2009)
- Most goals scored in a match by one player: 5 goals – Jermain Defoe for Tottenham Hotspur against Wigan Athletic (22 November 2009)
- Shortest time between goals: 50 seconds – Robin van Persie (41'52") and Cesc Fàbregas (42'42") for Arsenal against Tottenham Hotspur (31 October 2009)
- Most own goals scored in a match by same team: 3 – Portsmouth (Anthony Vanden Borre, Richard Hughes and Marc Wilson) against Manchester United (6 February 2010) However, on 26 May 2010, the Dubious Goal Committee declared the second own goal by Richard Hughes as Michael Carrick's goal.
- Last goal of the season: Diniyar Bilyaletdinov (Everton) against Portsmouth 93 minutes and 10 seconds (9 May 2010)
- Fewest times failed to score: 1 game – Chelsea against Birmingham
- Most times failed to score: 17 games – Wolverhampton Wanderers
- Highest scoring draw: 6 goals:
  - Bolton 3–3 Manchester City
  - Chelsea 3–3 Everton
  - Hull City 3–3 West Ham
  - Manchester City 3–3 Burnley

==== Top scorers ====
Rank	Scorer	Club	Goals
1	(Ivory Coast) Didier Drogba	Chelsea	29
2	(England) Wayne Rooney	Manchester United	26
3	(England) Darren Bent	Sunderland	24
4	(Argentina) Carlos Tevez	Manchester City	23
5	(England) Frank Lampard	Chelsea	22
6	(Spain) Fernando Torres	Liverpool	18
6	(England) Jermain Defoe	Tottenham Hotspur	18
8	(Spain) Cesc Fàbregas	Arsenal	15
9	(Togo) Emmanuel Adebayor	Manchester City	14
10	(England) Gabriel Agbonlahor	Aston Villa	13
10	(France) Louis Saha	Everton	13

=== Table-related statistics ===
==== Overall ====
- Most wins – Chelsea and Manchester United (27)
- Fewest wins – Hull City (6)
- Most losses – Burnley and Portsmouth (24)
- Fewest losses – Chelsea (6)
- Most goals scored – Chelsea (103)
- Fewest goals scored – Wolverhampton Wanderers (32)
- Most goals conceded – Burnley (82)
- Fewest goals conceded – Manchester United (28)
- Best goal difference – Chelsea (+71)
- Worst goal difference – Wigan Athletic (−42)

==== Home ====
- Most wins – Chelsea (17)
- Fewest wins – Portsmouth and Wolverhampton Wanderers (5)
- Most losses – Portsmouth (11)
- Fewest losses – Chelsea (1)
- Most goals scored – Chelsea (68)
- Fewest goals scored – Wolverhampton Wanderers (13)
- Most goals conceded – Portsmouth (32)
- Fewest goals conceded – Manchester United and Tottenham Hotspur (12)

==== Away ====
- Most wins – Manchester United (11)
- Fewest wins – Hull City (0)
- Most losses – Burnley (17)
- Fewest losses – Manchester City (4)
- Most goals scored – Arsenal and Chelsea (35)
- Fewest goals scored – Portsmouth and Stoke City (10)
- Most goals conceded – Wigan Athletic (55)
- Fewest goals conceded – Manchester United (16)

=== Clean sheets ===
- Most clean sheets – Manchester United (19)
- Fewest clean sheets – Burnley (3)

=== Discipline ===
- First yellow card of the season: Bernard Mendy for Hull City against Chelsea, 45+1 minute and 30 seconds (15 August 2009)
- First red card of the season: Sean Davis for Bolton Wanderers against Liverpool, 53 minutes and 57 seconds (29 August 2009)
- Card given at latest point in a game: Barry Ferguson (red) at 90+5 minutes and 27 seconds for Birmingham City against Manchester City (1 November 2009)
- Most yellow cards in a single match: 9
  - Manchester United 2–1 Arsenal – 3 for Manchester United (Wes Brown, Patrice Evra and Wayne Rooney) and 6 for Arsenal (Manuel Almunia, Bacary Sagna, William Gallas, Emmanuel Eboué, Alex Song, and Robin van Persie) (29 August 2009);
  - Sunderland 1–1 Wigan Athletic – 4 for Sunderland (Lorik Cana, Lee Cattermole, Kenwyne Jones and George McCartney) and 5 for Wigan (Gary Caldwell, Maynor Figueroa, James McCarthy, Charles N'Zogbia and Hugo Rodallega) (6 February 2010)
- Most red cards in a single match: 3 – Portsmouth 1–1 Sunderland – 1 for Portsmouth (Ricardo Rocha) and 2 for Sunderland (Lee Cattermole and David Meyler) (9 February 2010)

=== Miscellaneous ===
- Longest first half injury time: 8 minutes, 26 seconds – Stoke City against Chelsea (12 September 2009)
- Longest second half injury time: 10 minutes, 25 seconds – Hull City against Aston Villa (21 April 2010)
- Worst start to a Premier League season: 0 points from 7 games – Portsmouth (26 September 2009). Losing streak ended on 3 October 2009, with 1–0 victory over Wolverhampton Wanderers
- Most own goals in a season for a single team: 10 – Manchester United

=== Records ===
- Chelsea broke the record for most goals scored in a season with 103 goals, becoming the first Premier League club to cross the century mark. The previous record of 97 goals was set by Manchester United in the 1999–2000 season. The Blues also broke the record for the highest goal difference in a season with +71 goals. The previous record of +58 goals was set by Manchester United in the 2007–08 campaign. United equalled their own previous record during the 2009–10 campaign.
- Wigan Athletic were the first team to lose two matches by eight goals in a Premier League season, away to Tottenham Hotspur and Chelsea.
- Chelsea scored seven or more goals in four league matches, a record for both the club and the Premier League, and in consecutive home fixtures achieved an aggregate score of 15–0, in their last two home matches of the season against Stoke City and Wigan Athletic, having already scored seven in home matches against Sunderland and Aston Villa.

== Awards ==
=== Monthly awards ===
Month	Manager of the Month		Player of the Month	
Month	Manager	Club	Player	Club
August	(England) Harry Redknapp	Tottenham Hotspur	(England) Jermain Defoe	Tottenham Hotspur
September	(Scotland) Sir Alex Ferguson	Manchester United	(Spain) Fernando Torres	Liverpool
October	(England) Roy Hodgson	Fulham	(Netherlands) Robin van Persie	Arsenal
November	(Italy) Carlo Ancelotti	Chelsea	(England) Jimmy Bullard	Hull City
December	(Scotland) Alex McLeish	Birmingham City	(Argentina) Carlos Tevez	Manchester City
January	(Scotland) David Moyes	Everton	(England) Wayne Rooney	Manchester United
February	(England) Roy Hodgson	Fulham	(Australia) Mark Schwarzer	Fulham
March	(Scotland) David Moyes	Everton	(France) Florent Malouda	Chelsea
April	(Northern Ireland) Martin O'Neill	Aston Villa	(Wales) Gareth Bale	Tottenham Hotspur

=== Annual awards ===
Award	Winner	Club
Premier League Manager of the Season	(England) Harry Redknapp	Tottenham Hotspur
Premier League Player of the Season	(England) Wayne Rooney	Manchester United
PFA Players' Player of the Year	(England) Wayne Rooney	Manchester United
PFA Young Player of the Year	(England) James Milner	Aston Villa
FWA Footballer of the Year	(England) Wayne Rooney	Manchester United

PFA Team of the Year
Goalkeeper	(England) Joe Hart (Birmingham City)			
Defence	(France) Patrice Evra (Manchester United)	(Serbia) Branislav Ivanović (Chelsea)	(Belgium) Thomas Vermaelen (Arsenal)	(Republic of Ireland) Richard Dunne (Aston Villa)
Midfield	(England) James Milner (Aston Villa)	(Ecuador) Antonio Valencia (Manchester United)	(Scotland) Darren Fletcher (Manchester United)	(Spain) Cesc Fàbregas (Arsenal)
Attack	(England) Wayne Rooney (Manchester United)		(Ivory Coast) Didier Drogba (Chelsea)	

== Attendances ==
Manchester United drew the highest average home attendance in the 2009–10 edition of the Premier League as Old Trafford is the highest capacity stadium on the competition.

#	Football club	Home games	Average attendance
1	Manchester United	19	74,864
2	Arsenal FC	19	59,927
3	Manchester City	19	45,513
4	Liverpool FC	19	42,864
5	Chelsea FC	19	41,423
6	Sunderland AFC	19	40,355
7	Aston Villa	19	38,573
8	Everton FC	19	36,725
9	Tottenham Hotspur	19	35,794
10	West Ham United	19	33,683
11	Wolverhampton Wanderers	19	28,366
12	Stoke City	19	27,162
13	Blackburn Rovers	19	25,428
14	Birmingham City	19	25,246
15	Hull City	19	24,390
16	Fulham FC	19	23,909
17	Bolton Wanderers	19	21,881
18	Burnley FC	19	20,654
19	Portsmouth FC	19	18,249
20	Wigan Athletic	19	18,006
