= S. A. Cook =

S. A. Cook may refer to:

- Samuel A. Cook (1849–1918), U.S. Representative from Wisconsin
- Stanley Arthur Cook (1873–1949), Cambridge professor of Hebrew, lecturer in comparative religion, Encyclopedia Biblica editor
- Samuel Albert Cook (1878–1915), medical doctor and member of the American Red Cross mission in Serbia
- Stephen Arthur Cook (born 1939), American-Canadian computer scientist and mathematician
- Sharon Anne Cook (born 1947), Canadian historian
- Lacey Dancer (born 1948), American author of romance novels, uses S. A. Cook as one of her various pen names
