= Roxie Roker =

American actress (1929–1995)

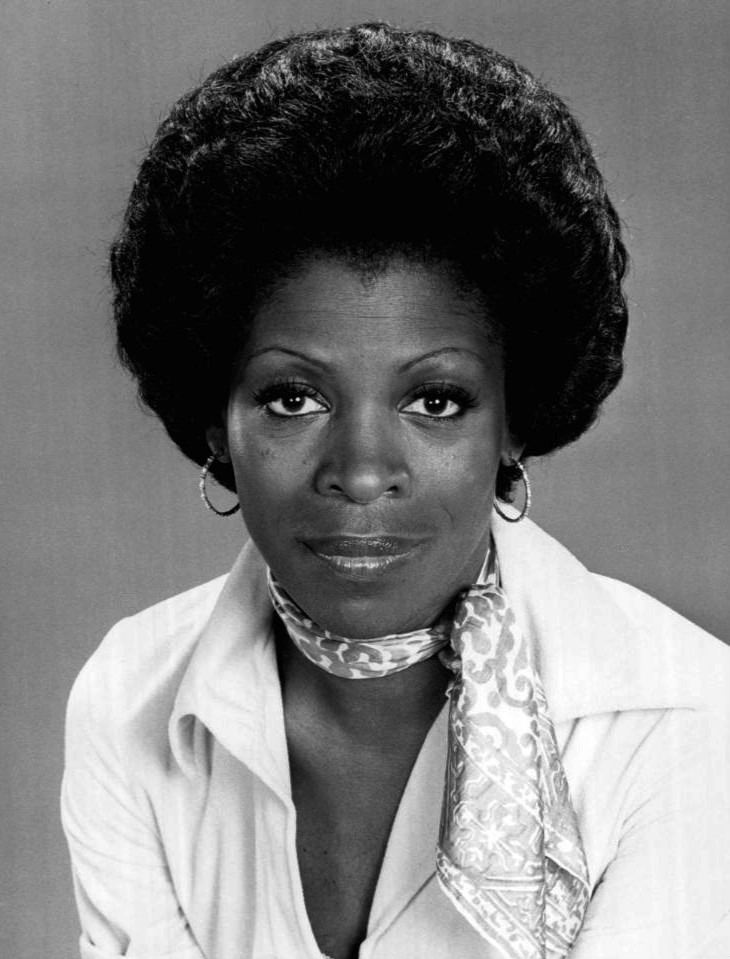
- Roker in 1976
- Born: Roxie Albertha Roker; August 28, 1929; Miami, Florida, U.S.
- Died: December 2, 1995 (aged 66); Los Angeles, California, U.S.
- Education: Howard University
- Occupations: Actress; television personality; news anchor
- Years active: 1973–1995
- Spouse: Sy Kravitz (m. 1962; div. 1985)
- Children: Lenny Kravitz
- Family: Zoë Kravitz (granddaughter); Al Roker (cousin once removed)

Roxie Albertha Roker (August 28, 1929 – December 2, 1995) was an American actress. She was best known for her portrayal of Helen Willis on the CBS sitcom The Jeffersons. In 1973, she performed as Mattie Williams in the Broadway play The River Niger, and was nominated for Best Featured Actress in a Play at the 28th Tony Awards. Roker is the mother of rock musician Lenny Kravitz and grandmother of actress Zoë Kravitz.

== Early life and education ==
Roker was born in Miami, Florida. Her mother, Bessie Roker (née Mitchell), was from Georgia and worked as a domestic. Her father, Albert Roker, was a porter and a native of Andros, the Bahamas. She grew up in Brooklyn, New York.

Roker studied drama at Howard University, where she was a pupil of celebrated drama teachers Anne Cooke Reid and Owen Dodson. Some of her fellow drama students at Howard included novelist Toni Morrison, actress Zaida Coles, stage director and playwright Shauneille Perry, and actor Graham Brown, all of whom were members of the university's theater troupe, the Howard Players. Roker toured with the Howard Players for performances in Norway in 1949, a trip sponsored by the United States Department of State and supported by Eleanor Roosevelt.

== Career ==
Roker began her professional career with the Negro Ensemble Company and became a successful stage actress. She won an Obie Award in 1974 and was nominated for a Tony Award for her portrayal of Mattie Williams in The River Niger. She was a reporter on WNEW-TV in New York in the 1970s and hosted a public affairs show for the station known as Inside Bed-Stuy, dealing with events in the Brooklyn neighborhood. Roker portrayed Helen Willis on The Jeffersons, breaking social barriers by becoming one half of the first Caucasian–African-American married couple (along with actor Franklin Cover) in a regular role on prime-time TV. She appeared as a guest star on many other American television shows from the 1970s through the 1990s, including Stone in the River starring Hal Miller for NBC, Punky Brewster, Hangin' with Mr. Cooper, Murder, She Wrote, A Different World, The Love Boat, $weepstake$, 227, Beat the Clock, Fantasy Island and ABC Afterschool Specials. She had roles in the television miniseries Roots and in the movie Claudine. Roker was also a children's advocate who was cited by the city of Los Angeles for her community work.

== Personal life ==
Roker was married to television producer Seymour Kravitz named Sy Kravitz in 1962. The couple had a son, singer-songwriter and actor Lenny Kravitz (b. May 26, 1964), and divorced in 1985. Roker and weather anchor Al Roker are first cousins once removed.

== Death ==
Roker died in Los Angeles, California, on December 2, 1995, of breast cancer. She was 66.

== Filmography ==
Year	Title	Role	Notes
1974	Change at 125th Street	Eloise Morse	TV movie
1974	Claudine	Mrs. Winston	
1975–1985	The Jeffersons	Helen Willis	
1977	Roots	Malizy	Episode: "Part V"
1977	Billy: Portrait of a Street Kid	Mrs. Peoples	TV movie
1979	$weepstake$	Margaret	Episode: "Roscoe, Elizabeth, and the M.C."
1979	The Bermuda Triangle	Bohamiar Radio Operator	Documentary
1982	Fantasy Island	Emily Carlisle	Episode: "The Kleptomaniac/Thank God, I'm a Country Girl"
1983	Making of a Male Model	Madge Davis	TV movie
1983–1987	ABC Afterschool Specials	Phyllis Brooks / Aunt Helen	2 episodes
1987	Amazon Women on the Moon	Female Republican	(segment "Blacks Without Soul")
1988	227 (TV series)	Dr. Thelma Butler	
1988	Punky Brewster	Judge J.F. Taylor	1 episode
1990	Penny Ante: The Motion Picture		
1991	Murder She Wrote	Jennifer Bryce	(Television Series) Season 8 - Episode 2: "Night Fears"
1991	A Different World	Dean Barksdale	Episode: "Home Is Where The Fire Is"
