= National Council of Negro Women =

American civil rights organization

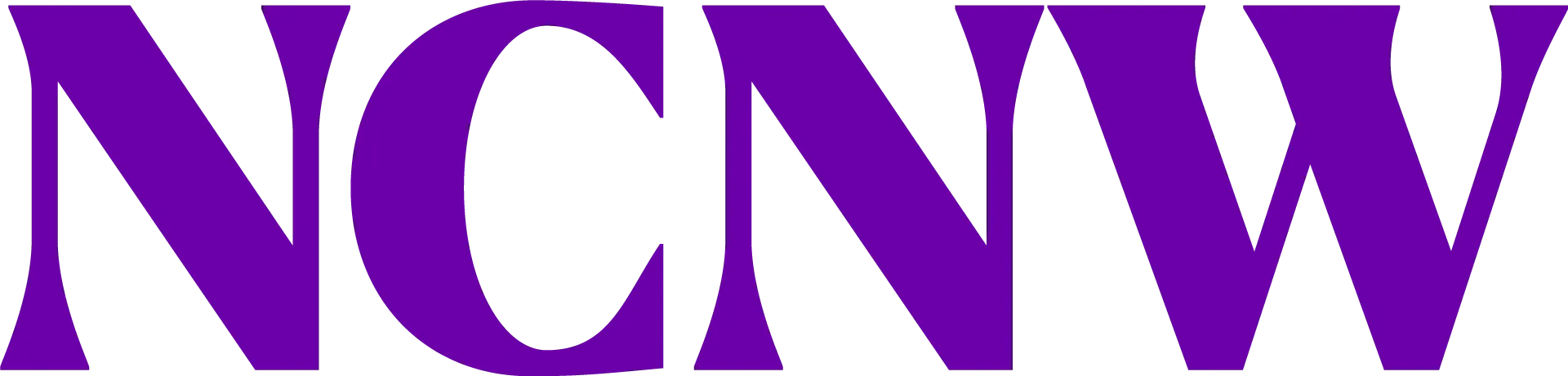

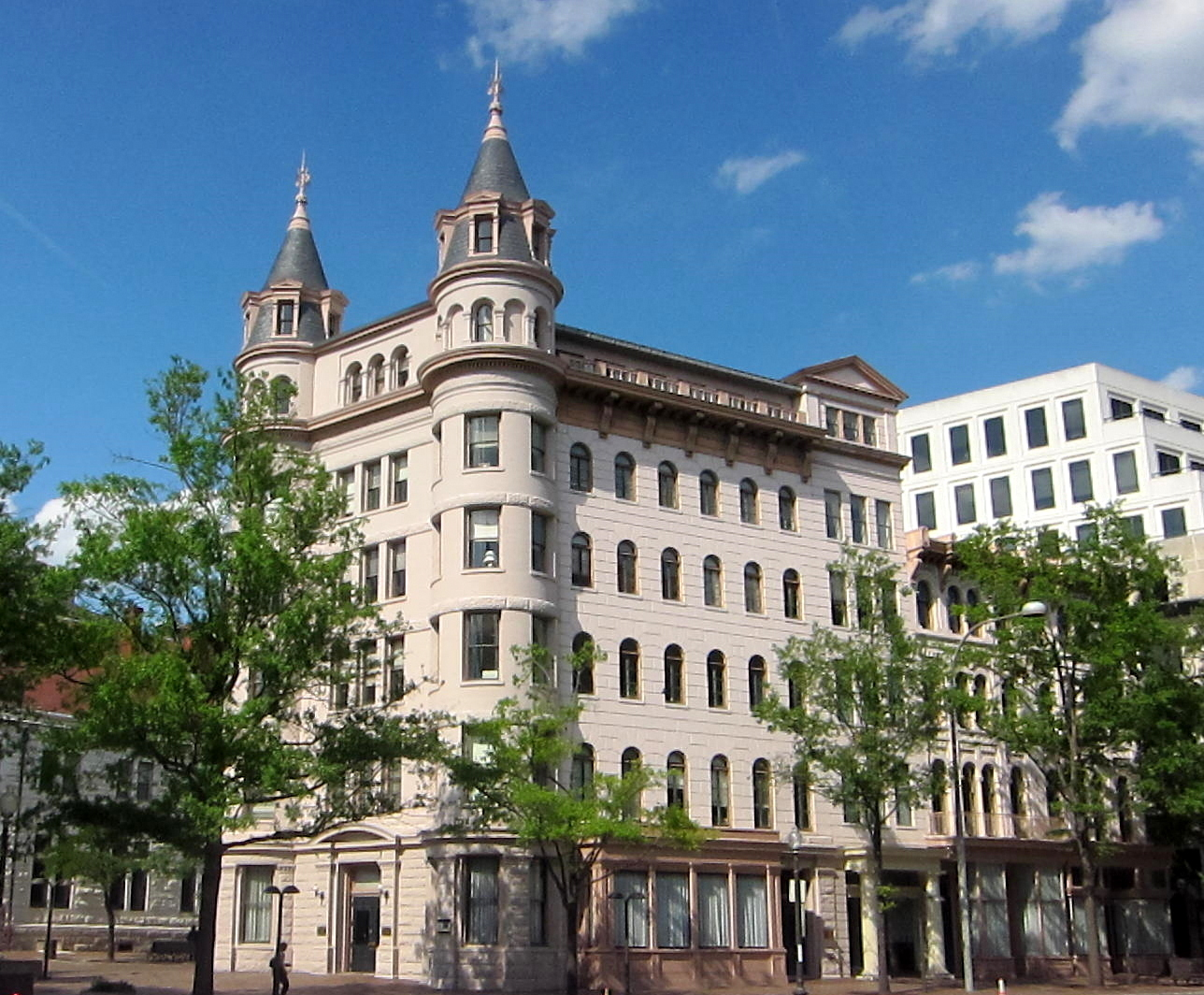
- The Dorothy I. Height Building, headquarters of the National Council of Negro Women
- Founded: 1935; 91 years ago
- Founder: Mary McLeod Bethune
- Location(s): Central National Bank Building; Washington, DC
- Coordinates: 38°53′36.2″N 77°01′16.3″W
- Chair: A. Lois Keith
- Website: ncnw.org

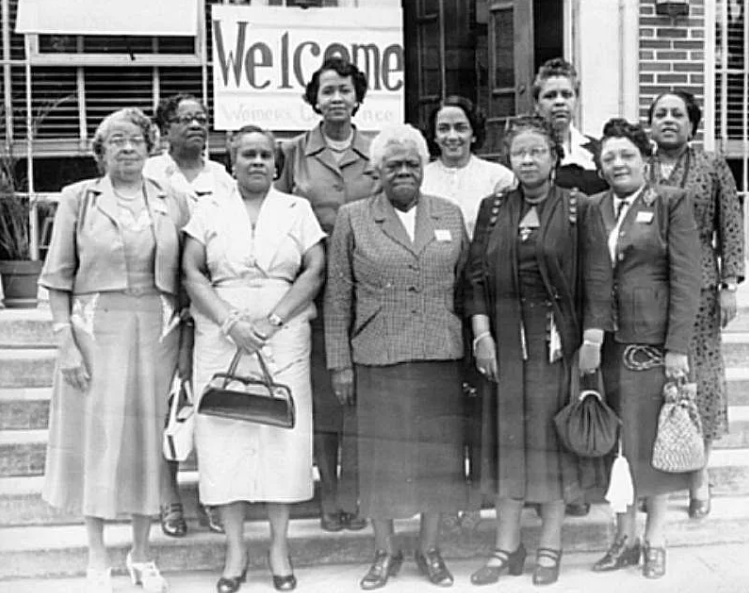
Officers of the National Council of Negro Women. Founder Mary McLeod Bethune is at center.

The National Council of Negro Women, Inc. (NCNW) is an American nonprofit organization founded in 1935 with the mission to advance the opportunities and the quality of life for African-American women, their families, and communities. Mary McLeod Bethune, the founder of NCNW, wanted to encourage the participation of Negro women in civic, political, economic and educational activities and institutions. The organization was considered as a clearing house for the dissemination of activities concerning women but wanted to work alongside a group that supported civil rights rather than go to actual protests. Women on the council fought more towards political and economic successes of black women to uplift them in society. NCNW fulfills this mission through research, advocacy, national and community-based services, and programs in the United States and Africa.

NCNW serves as a super organization that acts as a cohesive umbrella for the other African-American groups that already existed. With its 38 national affiliate organizations and about 200-500 community-based sections, NCNW has an outreach to nearly four million women, all contributing to the peaceful solutions of the problems of human welfare and rights. The national headquarters, which acts as a central source for program planning, is based in Washington, D.C., on Pennsylvania Avenue, located between the White House and the U.S. Capitol. NCNW also has two field offices.

== Expansion ==
The NCNW, started as a small collection of women's organizations focused on advocacy and community and has grown to become an "Organization of organizations" that focuses on supportive initiatives that continue to affect women of color. To do this, over time the NCNW has created programs and initiatives that help colored women thrive in home ownership, income raise, and entrepreneurship. Their main focus recently is to help support girls and women in STEM and social justice. The growth of the NCNW has started from the advocacy based in Washington D.C. and has only expanded into a larger, more impactful, and dedicated organization that is international. States like California, New York, and Pennsylvania have seen the most growth with up to 5 community-based sections and 10 collegiate sections in each.

== Social contributions ==
The NCNW also produced several cookbooks. Their first one, The Historical Cookbook of the American Negro, was published in 1958, edited by Sue Bailey Thurman. It took more than a decade to produce and fundraise for and includes research and contributions from African-American women across the country. The goal of the cookbook was in line with the goals of the NCNW, which include furthering world peace, further integration, and also hold on to and value African-American heritage as a unique cultural form. This cookbook is not organized by the genre of the food, but by the calendar year, starting with “Hopping John” for Emancipation Proclamation Day and ending with “Hot Apple Punch” for Christmas.

One of its goals was also to include recognition and appreciation for African-American heroes and heroines throughout history, such as George Washington Carver, for example, who gets one of his own recipes in the cookbook for "Carver Commemoration Day." Moreover, the cookbook aimed to insert African-American accomplishments into the mainstream idea of history in the U.S. that consists largely of the recorded the accomplishments of white men. In The Historical Cookbook of the American Negro, Sue Bailey Thurman set out to show how history resides in the social and cultural products of heritage recipes.

The NCNW did not produce another cookbook for more than thirty years, until the 1990s, when it came out with The Black Family Reunion Cookbook: Recipes and Food Memories (1991), The Black Family Dinner Quilt Cookbook: Health Conscious Recipes and Food Memories (1993), and Celebrating Our Mothers' Kitchens: Treasured Memories and Tested Recipes (1994). These three cookbooks were much more dedicated to food itself than The Historical Cookbook of the American Negro, but still included oral histories, personal narratives, political commentary, popular culture, and food and food customs, all intertwined with culinary instruction. The recipes are from both old family recipes from African-American women around the country, as well as documented historical recipes. Many recipes in these newer cookbooks start with an opening vignette about a loved family member or a story that ties the food to a special event or place.

These cookbooks also intended to emphasize the potency of food, happy memories with family, and the image of well-fed children in order to contribute to a positive African-American collective memory and to resist negative stereotypes about African-American women that have circulated in the U.S. since the times of slavery. The NCNW cookbooks work to form a cohesive African-American identity surrounding food.

== Political standpoint ==
Although Bethune and the NCNW were very much involved in the struggle over the Equal Rights Amendment, especially in the late 1940s, even she was careful to keep her organization on the conservative side of the issue and refused to support the amendment. In 1965 the NCNW recruited many northern women with professional backgrounds in such fields as psychology, social work, and education as well as unskilled volunteers to aid the Freedom Schools, and other developing programs under the Office of Economic Opportunity which the NCNW had held to establish in Mississippi.

== Mary McLeod Bethune ==
From 1936 to 1942, Bethune was simultaneously the president of Bethune-Cookman College (founded by her in 1904, for black students in Daytona, Florida), the first president and founder of the NCNW and the special Roosevelt as Director of the Division of Negro Affairs of the National Youth Administration. Her plans were to plan, initiate, and carry out the dreams of African-American women who felt unheard and mistreated.

== Other founders ==
When Bethune stepped down from the presidency of the NCNW, in November 1949 at the age of 74, her two successors, Dorothy B. Ferebee, who presided from 1949 to 1953, and Vivian C. Mason, who presided from 1953 to 1957, carried on the tradition of "black first". After 1958, under Dorothy Height's leadership, the NCNW began to move in new directions to come to terms with a number of old problems, and she works to bring the organization up to date with the times. In her first years as president, Height concentrated on achieving concrete goals: the acquisition of tax-exempt status; the erection of the Bethune Memorial Statue; the professionalization of the NCNW; and the establishment of Mary McLeod Bethune Memorial Museum and National Archives for Black Women's History.

== Dorothy Height ==
Dorothy Height served as the NCNW's fourth president from 1957 to 1997, helping women feel empowered until the day she died. She marched with Martin Luther King at the civil rights marches and was invited to President Obama's inauguration. President Obama also spoke at her funeral along with many other women and men who cared deeply for her. One of Height's main concerns was with the problems many blacks faced as a result of their poverty. So, she began a campaign in Mississippi that would make better food and shelter available for those at a disadvantage by partnering with the federal government to support Black women with getting houses built for their families. The main project of this campaign was to establish a "pig bank" which would lend pigs to black families and charge interest equal to one pig per family. By 1957 the original "pig banks," of what was 55 had grown to more than 2,000 pigs. Thus, the NCNW aided many poor families in the rural South by helping them to make many practical improvements in their daily lives. This program helped many families out of poverty giving them free meals to live off of.

== Archives project ==
Mary McLeod Bethune, the founder, worked to get African-American women their own institution that contained records and history of other black women to support the uplift of women's empowerment. She used the NCNW to help create the National Archives of Negro Women's History by establishing a committee specifically to find information about different African-American women so they could feel just as educated.

== National and international programs ==
Some of NCNW's recent programs include:

- The annual Black Family Reunion Program Celebration
- Public education and advocacy for African Americans on Supreme Court and lower court nominees
- Early childhood literacy programs to close the achievement gap
- A new initiative and publication entitled African American Women As We Age, which is intended to educate women on health and finances
- A national obesity abatement initiative
- A partnership with National Aeronautics and Space Administration (NASA) to develop Community Learning Centers targeting traditionally underserved students
- Technical assistance to eight Youth Opportunity Centers in Washington, DC

Some of NCNW's recent international activities include:

- Maintaining consultative status at the United Nations to represent the voice of African-American women
- Partnering with national women's organizations in Benin to deliver technology, literacy, microcredit and economic empowerment programs
- Linking youth in Uganda, north Africa and the U.S. in a three-nation educational exchange.

Developing a small business incubator in Senegal

- Partnering in the implementation of a large microcredit program in Eritrea extending small business loans and training to more than 500 women.

Serving as an umbrella organization for 39 national and local advocacy groups for women of African descent both in the U.S. and abroad, the National Council of Negro Women coordinates its activities with partners in 34 states. The council also runs four research and policy centers in its efforts to develop best practices in addressing the health, educational, and economic needs of African-American women. In 2007, NCNW's administrative costs were an estimated $4 million of the organization's group's $6 million budget for programs.

== National Black Family Reunion ==
NCNW organizes the National Black Family Reunion, a two-day cultural event celebrating the enduring strengths and traditional values of the African-American fathers.

== National chairs of NCNW ==
- Mary McLeod Bethune (1935–1949)
- Dorothy Boulding Ferebee (1949–1953)
- Vivian Carter Mason (1953–1957)
- Dorothy Height (1957–1997)
- Barbara L. Shaw (2010–2012)
- Ingrid Saunders Jones (2012–2018)
- Johnnetta B. Cole (2018–2022)
- Dr. Thelma T. Daley (2022–2023)
- Dr. A. Lois Keith (2023–present)

== National President & CEO ==
- Rev. Shavon L. Arline-Bradley (2023–present)

== Executive Directors of NCNW ==
- Alfreda Davis
- Naomah Maise (from 1953)
- Avis Jones-DeWeever (2010–2012)
- Janice L. Mathis (2016–2023)

== Uncommon Height Awards ==
As of 2016:

- 2020: Susan Taylor
- 2016: Tom Joyner
- 2016: Cicely Tyson
- 2014: John Lewis
- 2014: Valerie Montgomery Rice
- 2011: Ingrid Saunders Jones
- 2011: Steve Perry
- 2011: Earl W. Stafford
- 2011: Vanessa Williams
- 2009: Oprah Winfrey
- 2008: Sidney Poitier
- 2007: Dorothy I. Height
- 2006: Johnnetta B. Cole
- 2006: Ann M. Fudge
- 2006: Cathy Hughes
- 2005: Nancy Wilson
- 2004: Quincy Jones
- 2003: Bill and Camille Cosby
- 2002: Maya Angelou
- 2000: Vernon Jordan
- 1999: Marian Wright Edelman
- 1998: Dorothy I. Height

== See also ==
- Africana womanism
- List of women's organizations
