= Cookes =

Cookes is a surname. Notable people with the surname include:

- Samantha Cookes (born 1988), a British fraudster, convicted in England and Ireland
- Thomas Cookes (MP) (1804–1900), British politician
- Sir Thomas Cookes, 2nd Baronet (bap. 1648–1701), English philanthropist
- Cookes baronets

== See also ==
- Cooks (surname)
- Cooke, surname
