= College Language Association =

African-American collegiate language association

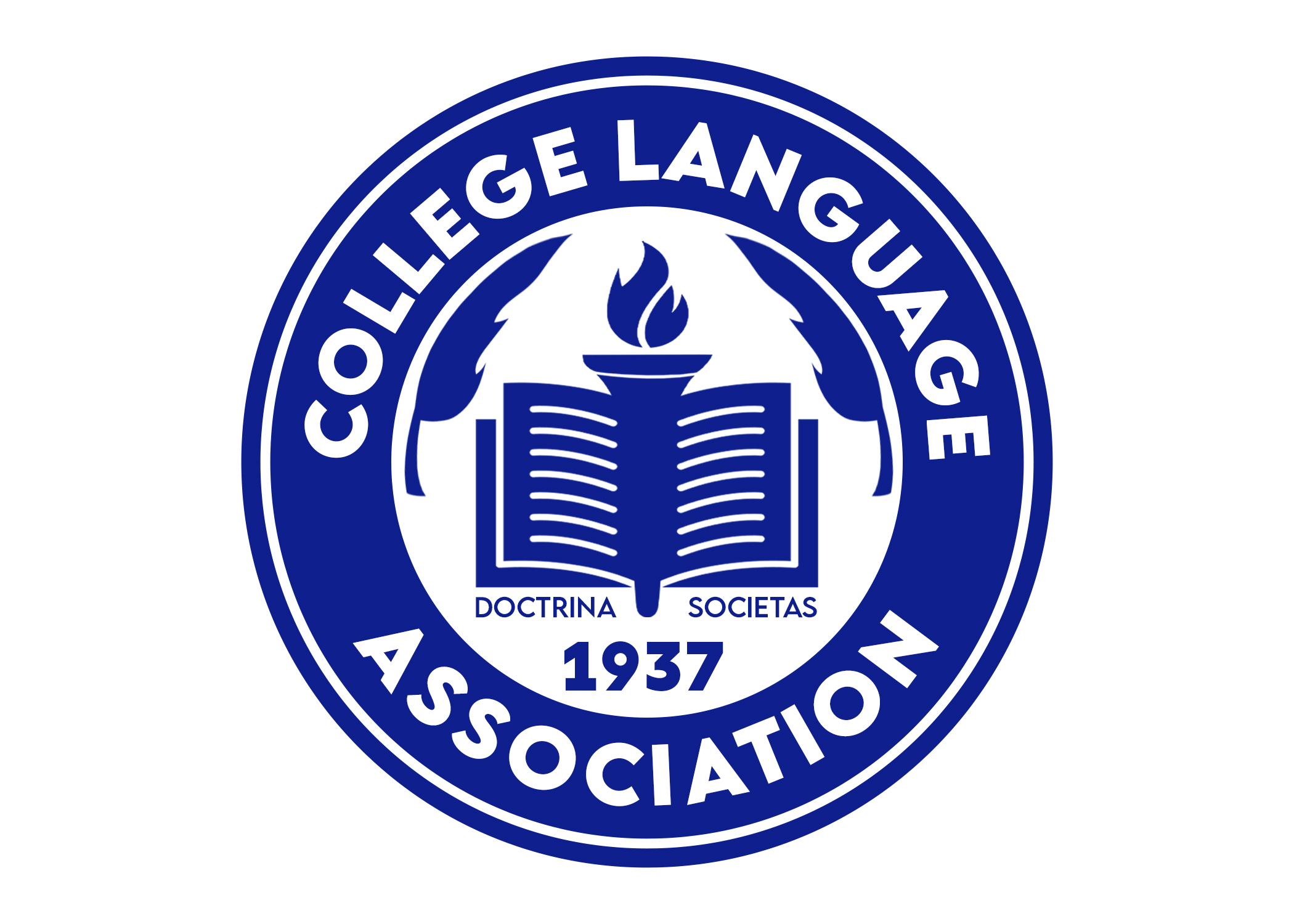
- Abbreviation: CLA
- Formation: 1937; 89 years ago
- Headquarters: Memphis, Tennessee, U.S.
- Fields: Language; literature
- President: Jervette R. Ward
- Website: https://clascholars.org

The College Language Association (CLA) is a professional association of Black scholars and educators who teach English and foreign languages. Founded in 1937 by a group of African-American language and literature scholars, the organization "serves the academic, scholarly and professional interests of its members and the collegiate communities they represent." The organization has approximately 450 members based in the United States and internationally. Members are primarily academic scholars, professors, and graduate students who specialize in African American studies and literature as well as world languages. Membership is open to all.

== History ==
Hugh Gloster, a professor of English at LeMoyne College corresponded with Gladstone Lewis Chandler of Morehouse College about the low English proficiency rates among their students. Together with other teachers at predominantly Black institutions, they formed the Association of Teachers of English in Negro Colleges in 1937. In 1941, the organization broadened their scope and changed their name to the Association of Teachers of Languages in Negro Colleges (ATLNC). The name was changed again in 1949 to the College Language Association (CLA).

The organization's membership has expanded to an international audience focusing on themes of African American, Caribbean and African diaspora studies. Members range from undergraduate students to university faculty. Notable contributors include John Frederick Matheus, Therman O'Daniel, Lucy Clemmons Grigsby, A. Russell Brooks, Darwin Turner, Charles A. Ray, Nick Aaron Ford, Dana Williams, Houston A. Baker Jr., Margaret Walker Alexander, Sterling Allen Brown, Maryemma Graham, Trudier Harris, and Jerry Ward.

== Mission ==
The College Language Association promotes and cultivates the study of languages and literatures to improve higher education experiences for students and teachers at colleges and universities across the world. CLA's annual Convention and peer-reviewed academic journal, the College Language Association Journal (CLAJ), support the organization's commitments to literary excellence, inclusivity, and advocacy for scholarly research in and the teaching of Black literatures and cultures as necessary aspects of higher education.

== Officers and Governance ==
All officers, except the Editor of the CLA Journal, shall be elected at the convention by majority vote. The officers of the association are the President, Vice President, Secretary and Communications Director, Membership Engagement Director, Treasurer, Assistant Treasurer, English Area Representative, World Languages Area Representative, and Editor of the CLA Journal. All officers must be current members of the association and in good financial standing.

The first president of the association was Hugh M. Gloster in 1937. The first woman to serve as president of the association was Billie Geter Thomas, in 1956. The current President is Jervette R. Ward (2022–2026), and the current Vice President is Janaka B. Lewis.

== Activities ==
CLA publishes the College Language Association Journal, an international multilingual peer-reviewed bi-annual publication. It is issued in September and March of each year.

CLA hosts an annual Convention in the spring of each year, preferably in April, at a place chosen with due regard to favoring the several geographical regions represented in the association and subject to venue availability. The Executive Committee is empowered to establish the time and place for the convention. The convention is attended each year by a majority of CLA’s members and consists of robust panels on African American, Caribbean and African diaspora studies, language, linguistics, creative writing, and pedagogy.

== Publications ==
- CLA Journal - ISSN 0007-8549
