= Arthur F. Raper =

American sociologist

Arthur Franklin Raper (8 November 1899 – 10 August 1979) was an American sociologist. He is best known for his research on lynching, sharecropping, and rural development.

== Life and career ==
Raper grew up in Davidson County, North Carolina and attended the University of North Carolina at Chapel Hill. He received an M.A. in Sociology from Vanderbilt University in Nashville, Tennessee. In 1925, he started his PhD at Chapel Hill, under the direction of Howard W. Odum, and completed it in 1931.

In 1926, he worked for the Commission on Interracial Cooperation with Will W. Alexander in Atlanta, Georgia. He later taught at Agnes Scott College in Decatur, Georgia. In 1927 he produced a report on the conditions of African Americans in Tampa, Florida with Benjamin Elijah Mays.

In 1939, he resigned after a furor over taking his students to visit the Tuskegee Institute. He studied and wrote about sharecropping in Macon County and Greene County. He exposed sharecropping as exploitative. His papers are in the Southern Historical Collection at the University of North Carolina, Chapel Hill Library; four of his books were reviewed by The New York Times.

A collection of Raper's materials are housed at the Special Collections Research Center at Fenwick Library at George Mason University.

== Bibliography ==
- Preface to Peasantry (University of North Carolina Press, 1936); excerpts; Online free to borrow
- The Tragedy of Lynching. Chapel Hill: University of North Carolina Press, Social Studies Series, presented by the Southern Commission on the Study of Lynching. 1933. pp. 319–355 – via HathiTrust. LCCN 33-9073 (1933), LCCN 69-14943 (1969); LCCN 72-90191 (1969), LCCN 69-16568 (1960), OCLC 2018078 (all editions), 1081157881, 1081157881, 1068181841.
- Sharecroppers All (University of North Carolina Press, 1941, co-authored with Ira De Augustine Reid)
- Tenants of the Almighty (University of North Carolina Press, 1943)
- Raper, Arthur F.; Han-sheng Chuan; Shao-hsing Chen (1954). Urban and Industrial Taiwan―Crowded and Resourceful. Taipei: Good Earth Press. OCLC 1686127.
- Rural Development in Action (Cornell University Press, 1970)
- "Some Effects of Land Reform in 13 Japanese Villages," Journal of Farm Economics (Vol. 33, No. 2, May 1951)
- "Old Conflicts in the New South," by Ira De Augustine Reid and Arthur Raper, Virginia Quarterly Review Spring 1940.
