= Charles Cooke =

Charles Cooke may refer to:

- Charles Cooke (basketball) (born 1994), basketball player for the New Orleans Pelicans of the NBA
- Sir Charles Cooke (Grampound MP) (died 1721), merchant and politician
- Charles A. Cooke (1848–1917), North Carolina Supreme Court justice
- Charles Bowen Cooke (1859–1920), British locomotive engineer
- Charles Angus Cooke (1870–1958), Iroquois scholar
- Charles C. W. Cooke (born 1984), English-born American editor of National Review Online
- Charles M. Cooke (1844–1920), North Carolina Secretary of State and legislator
- Charles M. Cooke Jr. (1886–1970), U.S. admiral, commander of the 7th Fleet
- Charles Montague Cooke (1849–1909), businessman and benefactor of educational institutions
- Charles Montague Cooke Jr. (1874–1948), his son, American malacologist
- Charles Cooke (Conservative politician) (1841–1911), British farmer, cider producer and Conservative politician
- Charles Cooke (cricketer) (1836–1892), English cricketer and clergyman

== See also ==
- Charles Cook (disambiguation)
- Charlie Cooke (born 1942), Scottish footballer
- Charles Fletcher-Cooke (1914–2001), British politician
- Charles Cooke Hunt (1833–1868), explorer of Western Australia
