= Sam Cook =

Sam Cook may refer to:

- Sam C. Cook (1855–1924), associate justice of the Supreme Court of Mississippi
- Sam Cook (cricketer, born 1921) (1921–1996), English cricketer
- Sam Cook (cricketer, born 1997), English cricketer
- Sam Cook (rugby league) (born 1993), New Zealand rugby league player

== See also ==
- Sam Cooke (1931–1964), American singer
- Samuel Cook (disambiguation)
- Sam Koch (born 1982), pronounced Cook, American football punter
