= Asbury United Methodist Church (Washington, D.C.) =

Historic church in Washington, D.C., United States

- U.S. National Register of Historic Places
- D.C. Inventory of Historic Sites
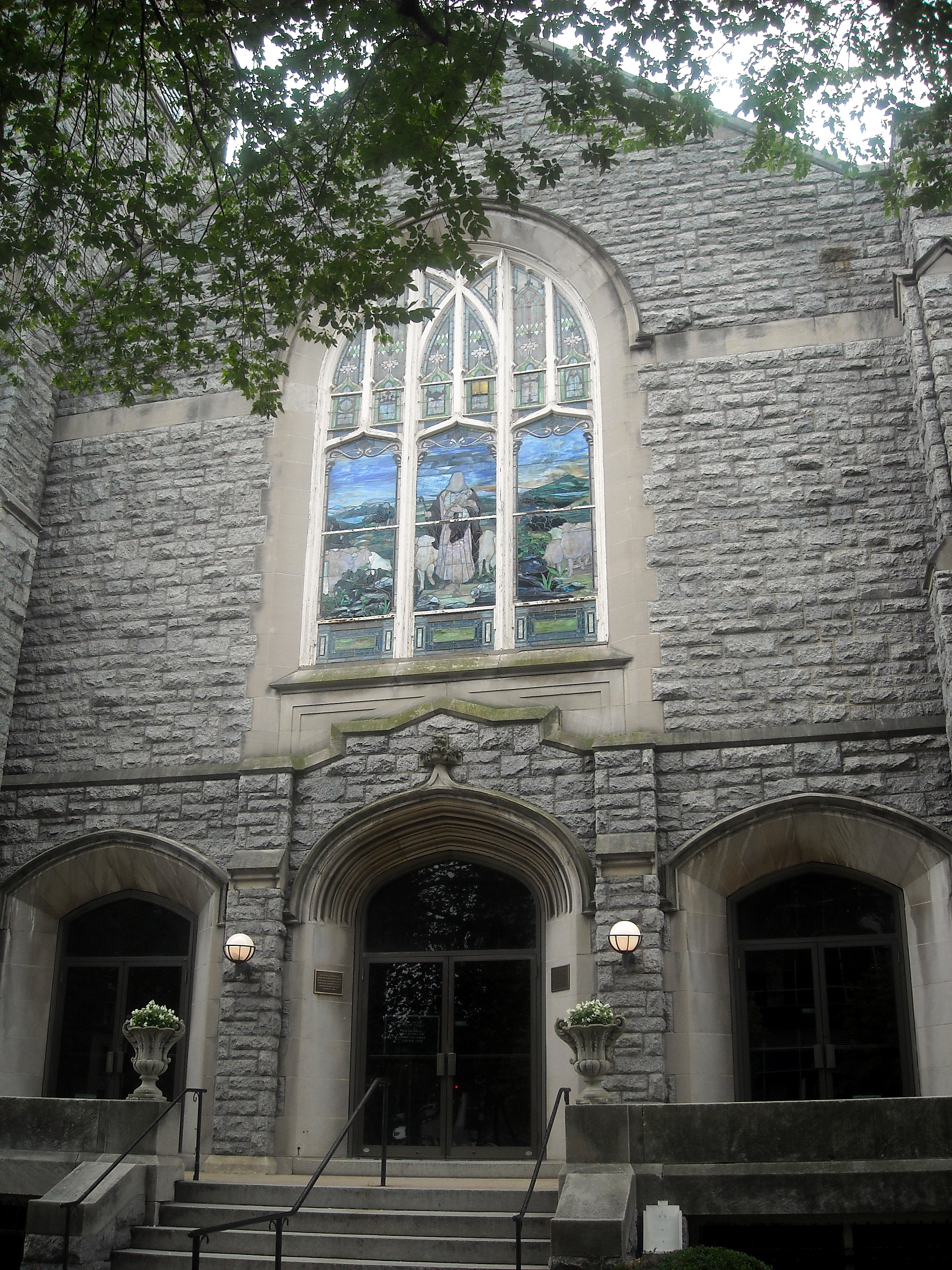

- Location within Central Washington, D.C. Location within the District of Columbia Location within the United States
- Location: Eleventh and K Sts. NW Washington, D.C.
- Coordinates: 38°54′8″N 77°1′39″W
- Area: 0.3 acres (0.12 ha)
- Architect: Harding, Clarence Lowell
- Architectural style: Late Gothic Revival, English Gothic Revival
- NRHP reference No.: 86003029

Significant dates
- Added to NRHP: November 01, 1986
- Designated DCIHS: March 21, 1984

Asbury United Methodist Church, founded in 1836 as Asbury Chapel, is the oldest black United Methodist church in Washington, D.C.

Located on the corner of 11th and K Streets Northwest, it was placed on the District of Columbia Register of Historic Places on November 1, 1986. It was added to the National Register of Historic Places in 1986. In 2003, the National Park Service approved the listing of Asbury on the National Underground Railroad Network to Freedom.

== History ==
Founded in 1836, the church was a pioneer of African-American Methodism in Washington, D.C., and of social history through abolition, Emancipation, Reconstruction, and the Civil Rights movement. It is the city's oldest African-American church to remain on its original site. A new building on the same site was completed in 1870. The current building was designed by Clarence Lowell Handing and built in 1915–1916 in the English Gothic Revival architectural style.

In the 1920s, the building had alterations by African American architect, William Wilson Cooke.

In December 2020, the congregation's Black Lives Matter banner was burned during an event for President Donald Trump, an action the congregation's senior pastor described as "reminiscent of cross burnings". In January 2021, Enrique Tarrio, chairman of the Proud Boys, was arrested in relation to the incident.

On July 15, 2021, the National Trust for Historic Preservation announced Asbury United Church as one of 40 sites and organizations to receive $3 million in grants from the African American Cultural Heritage Action Fund. The grant is to be used for repairs to the church’s wood windows and bell tower masonry, as well as repointing and cleaning of its stone facade.
