= William Wilson Cooke =

American architect (1871–1949)

- Born: December 27, 1871; Greenville, South Carolina, U.S.
- Died: August 25, 1949 (aged 77); Gary, Indiana, U.S.
- Burial place: Fern Oak Cemetery, Griffith, Indiana, U.S.
- Other names: William Wilson Cook, W. W. Cooke
- Education: Boston School of Technology; Columbia University; Claflin College
- Occupations: Architect, school administrator
- Spouse: Anne Miller
- Children: 2, including Anne Cooke, Lloyd Miller Cooke
- Father: Wilson Cooke
- Relatives: Vardry McBee (grandfather), Thomas Ezekiel Miller (father in-law), Ira De Augustine Reid (son in-law)

William Wilson Cooke (1871–1949) was an American architect. He worked in the Office of the Supervising Architect of the United States Department of the Treasury and was the first African American man to be employed there. Cooke was the first African American to obtain an architect's license in the state of Indiana in 1929. He designed many buildings for Claflin College, the Cookman Institute, and the United States Postal Service. Early in his career he worked as a school official.

== Early life and education ==
William Wilson Cooke was born on December 27, 1871, in Greenville, South Carolina. His parents were Magdalena Walker and Wilson Cooke, a former slave, merchant and local politician. He had four siblings, all of whom attended Claflin College. His paternal grandfather was Vardry McBee, an influential entrepreneur, a white slave holder, and philanthropist of Greenville. Cooke attended school in Greenville until age 14, and then served as a carpenters apprentice from 1885 until 1888.

Cooke attended Claflin College (now Claflin University) in Orangeburg from 1888 to 1893, where he studied architectural drawing and graduated with a college preparatory diploma in liberal arts. In 1900, he attended classes Boston School of Technology (now Massachusetts Institute of Technology) and architecture classes at Columbia University. He returned to Claflin College to receive a B.S. degree in technology in 1902.

== Career ==
From 1894 to 1897, he served as superintendent of industrial arts at Georgia State Industrial College for Colored Youth (now Savannah State University). He then returned to Claflin College in order to serve as the superintendent of manual training and industrial arts, replacing Robert Charles Bates. He also took classes to receive a B.S. in technology.

After completing school, Cooke was employed by the Freedmen's Aid Society and Women's Missionary Society of the Methodist Episcopal Church as an architect from 1902 and 1907.

In March 1907, he took a three-day federal civil service examination in Boston, Massachusetts, as the required workplace admission test at that time was not offered to African-Americans in Washington, D.C. He passed the exams and was hired in the Office of the Supervising Architect of the United States Department of the Treasury. This made him the first African American man to be employed at that department. In 1909, he transferred departments to Field Operations, where he would supervise the construction of federal courthouses and post offices. He continued to work at the Office of the Supervising Architect until 1918, when he changed jobs. He went to work as director of vocational guidance and training at Wilberforce University, where he remained until 1921.

From 1921 to 1929, Cooke had a private architectural practice at 1828 Broadway, Gary, Indiana. He was also the director of Gary Building and Loan Association. Cooke was the first African American to obtain an architect's license in the state of Indiana on October 25, 1929. After the Wall Street Crash of 1929, he lost his firm and had accrued great debt, to which he was eventually able to repay.

In 1931, Cooke re-joined the Office of the Supervising Architect working as a construction engineer; he designed small-town post offices in a few states. In the 1920s and 1930s, Cooke ran an organization that was anti-Ku Klux Klan, as well as anti-“Bow Tie Amalgamation” group (a Black-led group that was KKK-affiliated) in Gary, because these two groups were active locally. He retired from the federal government in 1942.

Cooke's profile was included in the biographical dictionary African American Architects: A Biographical Dictionary, 1865–1945 (2004).

== Personal life ==
He married Anne Miller, and they had two children, Anne Cooke Reid and Lloyd Miller Cooke. His wife Anne Miller's father was Thomas Ezekiel Miller, a member of the U.S. House of Representatives from South Carolina's 7th district. His son in-law was sociologist Ira De Augustine Reid, however Cooke died before the marriage.

Towards the end of his life, Cooke lived at 2319 Adams Street, Gary, Indiana.

== Works ==
A list of Cookes' architectural design work, broken up by project and listed in ascending date order.

=== Claflin College ===
- Lee Library (1898), Claflin College (now Claflin University), Orangeburg, South Carolina
- Slater Training Building (1900), Claflin College (now Claflin University), Orangeburg, South Carolina
- Louise Stokes Girls Dormitory (1904), Claflin College (now Claflin University), Orangeburg, South Carolina
- Louise Soules Home for Girls (1905), Claflin College (now Claflin University), Orangeburg, South Carolina
- Tingley Memorial Hall (the main building) (1905), Claflin College (now Claflin University), Orangeburg, South Carolina; NRHP-listed
- Mary E. Dutton Boys' Dormitory (1907), Claflin College (now Claflin University), Orangeburg, South Carolina
- Presidents Residence (or Dunwalton), Claflin College (now Claflin University), Orangeburg, South Carolina

=== United States Post Offices ===
- U.S. Post Office (1911), Athens, Ohio
- U.S. Post Office (1914), Defiance, Ohio
- U.S. Post Office (1914), Bowling Green, Ohio
- U.S. Post Office (1917), Ashland, Ohio
- U.S. Post Office (1931), Lancaster, Pennsylvania
- U.S. Post Office (1932), Sheboygan, Wisconsin
- U.S. Post Office (1935), International Falls, Minnesota
- U.S. Post Office (1938), Millville, Wisconsin
- U.S. Post Office (1938), Columbus, Wisconsin
- U.S. Post Office (1940), Bluffton, Ohio
- U.S. Post Office (1941), Coldwater, Ohio
- U.S. Post Office (1941), Crestline, Ohio
- U.S. Post Office, Marietta, Ohio
- U.S. Post Office, Ironton, Ohio
- U.S. Post Office, Appleton, Wisconsin (demolished)
- U.S. Post Office, Hibbing, Minnesota

=== Cookman Institute ===
- Main building (1901), Cookman Institute (now Bethune–Cookman University), Jacksonville, Florida
- Dining Hall and Girls Home (1901), Cookman Institute (now Bethune–Cookman University), Jacksonville, Florida

=== Other buildings ===
- Georgia State Industrial College for Colored Youth campus building (1896), Savannah, Georgia (destroyed by fire)
- John Hammond Fordham residence (1903), 415 Boulevard Street, Orangeburg, South Carolina
- First A.M.E. Church (1923), 2001 Massachusetts Street, Gary, Indiana
- Asbury United Methodist Church (1920s renovation), Washington, D.C.
- St. John Hospital (c. 1920s), 28 E. 22nd Street, Gary, Indiana
- Trinity Methodist Episcopal Church (1925), 15th Avenue at Massachusetts Street, Gary, Indiana
- John Stewart Settlement House (1925), 1501 Massachusetts Street, Gary, Indiana; NRHP-listed
- Campbell Friendship House, 21st Street at Washington Avenue, Gary, Indiana

== See also ==
- African-American architects
- National Register of Historic Places listings in Orangeburg County, South Carolina
- Robert Charles Bates, an early architecture teacher at Claflin University
