= James McGowen (disambiguation) =

James McGowen (1855–1922) was premier of New South Wales (1910–1913).

James McGowen may also refer to:

- James McGowen (Tasmanian politician) (1905–1994), member of the Tasmanian House of Assembly
- James G. McGowen (1870–1940), US justice

== See also ==
- James McGowan (disambiguation)
