= John Stewart Settlement House =

Historic residential building in Indiana, United States

- Formerly listed on the U.S. National Register of Historic Places
- Location: 1501 Massachusetts St., Gary, Indiana
- Area: less than one acre
- Built: 1925
- Architect: William Wilson Cooke; Luther Moore
- Architectural style: Tudor Revival
- NRHP reference No.: 78000039

Significant dates
- Added to NRHP: June 7, 1978
- Removed from NRHP: November 4, 1992

John Stewart Settlement House, also known as the Stewart House , was a historic settlement house located at Gary, Indiana. It was built in 1925, and was a 2 1/2-story, U-shaped, Tudor Revival style brick and stucco building. It has been demolished.

It was listed in the National Register of Historic Places in 1977 and delisted in 1992.
