= Onkweonwe =

Onkweonwe was a Mohawk language newspaper conceived, compiled, edited, and published by Charles Angus Cooke (Thawennensere) (1870–1958). Cooke was an Iroquois civil servant in the Government of Canada whose career coincided with that of Deputy Superintendent of Indian Affairs (and acclaimed poet/author), Duncan Campbell Scott. He was also closely associated with the Canadian anthropologist, Marius Barbeau.

Onkweonwe (Mohawk for "the only human being" or "the real human being") was first published in 1900. According to an article published in May, 1901 in the Sudbury Journal, Onkweonwe began “some time ago…[as] a semi-monthly magazine.” So successful was the endeavour, Cooke “decided to turn it into a newspaper, the first of its kind in Canada and the second in America.”

The newspaper solicited contributions from Mohawk people from throughout the provinces of Québec and Ontario, and New York state. The only known surviving copy of Onkweonwe is volume 1, number 1 (October 25, 1900), housed at Library and Archives Canada. However, the Sudbury Journal republished at least two stories from the newspaper in May, 1901 (not included in volume 1, number 1), proof that further issues were indeed published, although their extent is not known. Although short-lived, the paper was the first Aboriginal language newspaper written, compiled, and published solely by an Aboriginal person in Canada (and just the second in North America). All previous publications in Aboriginal languages in Canada were written and published by European, Canadian, or American missionaries.

== See also ==
- Two Row Times, weekly publication in Ohsweken, Ontario.
- Cherokee Phoenix (1828-1834), the first newspaper published by Aboriginals in the United States
- Cherokee Advocate (1844-1906), a newspaper running contemporary to Onkweonwe in the United States
