= Darwin T. Turner =

American writer and professor (1931–1991)

- Born: May 7, 1931; Cincinnati, Ohio, U.S.
- Died: February 11, 1991 (aged 59); Iowa City, Iowa, U.S.
- Spouse: Edna Bonner (m. 1949; div. 1961) Maggie Jean Lewis (m. 1968–1991)
- Children: 3

Academic background
- Education: University of Cincinnati (BA and MA); University of Chicago (PhD)

Academic work
- Discipline: African American studies, English literature, American drama
- Institutions: University of Iowa

Darwin Theodore Troy Turner (May 7, 1931 – February 11, 1991) was an American literary critic, scholar, poet, and professor who wrote about African-American history. He is known for contributions to the field of African American Studies (now Black Studies) and African American literary studies. Considered to be a child prodigy, he enrolled in the University of Cincinnati at the age of 13, making him the youngest student to ever graduate from the university.

== Early life ==
Darwin Theodore Troy Turner was born on May 7, 1931, in Cincinnati, Ohio. He came from a family of academics; his father Darwin Romanes Turner was a pharmacist, and his mother Laura Knight was a writer and schoolteacher who graduated from University of Cincinnati at the age of 18. His grandfather Charles H. Turner, a psychologist, was the first African American to receive a PhD in biology from the University of Chicago.

Turner was considered to be a child prodigy, completing fourth grade by the age of four, and graduating high school at the age of 13. Turner enrolled in University of Cincinnati in 1944 at the age of 13. While studying at University of Cincinnati, Turner was unable to live on campus because the school did not offer housing to African-American students. He completed his Bachelor of Arts degree in 1947 and joined the Phi Beta Kappa honor society at 16. He was the youngest student to ever graduate from the university.

== Academic career ==
After completing a Master's degree in English and American literature in 1949, he married Edna Bonner and began teaching at Clark College, Atlanta. In 1952, he became an assistant professor at Morgan State College. While teaching, he continued his studies at the University of Chicago where he graduated with a PhD by the age of 25.

From 1957 to 1959, Turner was the Chair of the English department at Florida A&M University. He then joined the faculty of North Carolina A&T State University, becoming dean of the university's graduate school in 1966. He and Bonner divorced in 1961, and he married schoolteacher Maggie Jean Lewis in 1968. He had three children. He became frustrated by the lack of emphasis placed on the liberal arts at technical universities, and left to join the University of Michigan in 1970. Turner's contemporary Melba Joyce Boyd described him as a "perfectionist" who felt that he had to be without flaw in his academic and personal life in order to overcome racial prejudice.

In 1972, Turner joined the faculty at University of Iowa's newly created Afro-American studies program, which was being developed by Robert A. Corrigan. Turner was the Chair of African American Studies at University of Iowa from 1972 until 1991. He was named Distinguished Professor of English in 1984. During his tenure he expanded the field of African American studies, creating courses in African-American history and culture. Turner also instructed educators in those fields, and presented yearly seminars at the Summer Institute.

Over the course of his career, Turner edited and authored more than 17 books, and wrote more than a hundred articles, book reviews and other works. His work drew attention to the accomplishments of Black artists and intellectuals.

Turner died on February 11, 1991, at Mercy Hospital in Iowa City, Iowa. At the time of his death he was completing a collection of his own writings, which was published posthumously as Black Drama in America in 1994.

== Legacy ==
Turner is considered to be a pioneer in the field of African American studies. The 1992 fall issue of The Langston Hughes Review was dedicated to him.

The Darwin T. Turner Scholars Program at the University of Cincinnati, the Darwin Turner Endowment at the University of Iowa were established after his death. The Black Action Theatre at University of Iowa was renamed the Darwin Turner Action Theatre. Since 2018, the College Language Association has presented the Darwin T. Turner Best Essay Award.

== Writings ==
- In a Minor Chord: Three Afro-American Writers and Their Search for Identity
- Katharsis
- Nathaniel Hawthorne's "The Scarlet Letter"
- Black Drama in America: An Anthology , editor
- Afro-American Writers, a bibliography
- Black American Literature, Essays, editor
