= Cooks (surname) =

Cooks is a surname. Notable people with the name include:

- Brandin Cooks (born 1993), American football player
- Bridget R. Cooks, American art historian and curator
- Carlos A. Cooks (1913–1966), American activist
- Elijah Cooks (born 1998), American football player
- Johnie Cooks (1958–2023), American football player
- Judah Cooks (born 1976), American soccer player and coach
- Kerry Cooks (born 1974), American football player and coach
- Micah Cooks (born 1981), American soccer player
- R. Graham Cooks, American chemist
- Rayford Cooks (born 1982), American football player
- Terrence Cooks (born 1966), American football player
- Xavier Cooks (born 1995), Australian basketball player
- Zach Cooks (born 1999), American basketball player

== See also ==
- Davita Vance-Cooks, American business executive
- Cookes, surname
- Cook (surname)
