= Thomas E. Miller =

American politician (1849–1938)

Thomas Ezekiel Miller
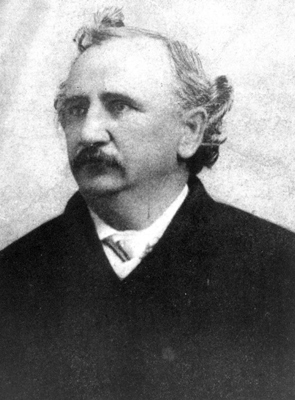

Member of the U.S. House of Representatives from South Carolina's 7th district
- In office September 24, 1890 – March 3, 1891
- Preceded by: William Elliot
- Succeeded by: William Elliot

Personal details
- Born: June 17, 1849 Ferrebeeville, South Carolina, United States
- Died: April 8, 1938 (aged 88) Charleston, South Carolina, United States
- Party: Republican
- Spouse: Anna M. Hume
- Relations: William Wilson Cooke (son in-law)
- Education: Lincoln University (Pennsylvania)
- Profession: Educator, attorney

Thomas Ezekiel Miller (June 17, 1849 – April 8, 1938) was an American educator, lawyer and politician. After being elected as a state legislator in South Carolina, he was one of only five African Americans elected to Congress from the South in the Jim Crow era of the last decade of the nineteenth century, as disfranchisement reduced black voting. After that, no African Americans were elected from the South until 1972.

Miller was a prominent leader in the struggle for civil rights in the American South during and after Reconstruction. He was a school commissioner, state legislator, U.S. Representative, and first president of South Carolina State University, a historically black college established as a land-grant school.

== Early life and education ==
Miller was born in Ferrebeeville, South Carolina, named after his adoptive mother's likely slaver. His origins were unclear although he apparently had majority European heritage. The historians Eric Foner and Stephen Middleton found that his mother was a fair-skinned mulatto daughter of Judge Thomas Heyward Jr., a signer of the Declaration of Independence, and his father a wealthy young white man, whose family rejected their relationship. They forced him to give up his son for adoption. He was adopted by former slaves Richard and Mary Ferrebee Miller, who were freed by 1850.

The boy's European appearance long prompted speculation about his paternity. In 1851, his family moved to Charleston, where Miller attended a school for free colored children. When the Civil War ended, he moved to Hudson, New York. Because of his appearance and high proportion of European ancestry, Miller could have passed for white in the North, but chose to identify as black and return to the South to help the freedmen. Receiving a scholarship, Miller attended Lincoln University, a historically black college in Pennsylvania, where he graduated in 1872.

Miller returned to South Carolina, where he was appointed as a school commissioner of Beaufort County that same year. He studied law at the South Carolina College (now the University of South Carolina), where black students were admitted for the first time under the Republican state legislature, and graduated in 1875. He was admitted to the bar that year. (After Democrats regained control of the state legislature in 1876-1877, they forced black students out of the flagship college.)

== Marriage and family ==
He married Anna Hume, and they had nine children together. His son-in law was noted architect, William Wilson Cooke, married to his daughter Anne Miller; and by whom he had two grandchildren, Anne Cooke Reid, and Lloyd Miller Cooke.

== Political career ==
Miller was elected as a Republican to the South Carolina House of Representatives in 1874, serving three terms until 1880. He was elected to the South Carolina Senate in 1880, serving one term until 1882. He was nominated for lieutenant governor but did not enter the race. He struggled his entire life to find acceptance in the black and white communities. African-American political rivals dismissed him as a white imposter attempting to take advantage of the post–Civil War black electorate. Yet Miller, who embraced the black heritage nurtured by his adoptive parents, was also ostracized by white colleagues.

Despite the issues, he was elected chairman of the state Republican Party in 1884.

In 1888, Miller ran for U.S. Representative from the 7th Congressional District, which had been gerrymandered by the state legislature to include many blacks. They defined other districts to have overwhelmingly white populations. The Democratic candidate William Elliot challenged him and won the official vote count, 8,358 to 7,003 for Miller. Miller contested the election result, and pressed allegations that many properly registered black voters had not been able to cast their ballots, due to the confusion of the "eight-box ballot" system established in 1882. Whites received instruction but blacks did not and suffered votes being disqualified as a result. Over the years, the discouragement of the system had caused a severe drop in voting turnout by blacks. The House Committee of Elections ruled in Miller's favor, and he was finally seated in the Fifty-First Congress in 1890. He was defeated for his seat in the election by William Elliot in the fall election for the Congress starting in 1891.

As African-American candidates competed in "black" districts, men's ancestry became part of the political fodder; tensions became heightened between mulattoes like Miller and darker-skinned politicians such as George W. Murray. Miller, Robert Smalls (also a mulatto) and Murray competed for the Republican nomination in the 7th "shoestring district" during the 1890s. Murray took it in 1892. Miller was re-elected to the South Carolina House of Representatives in 1894.

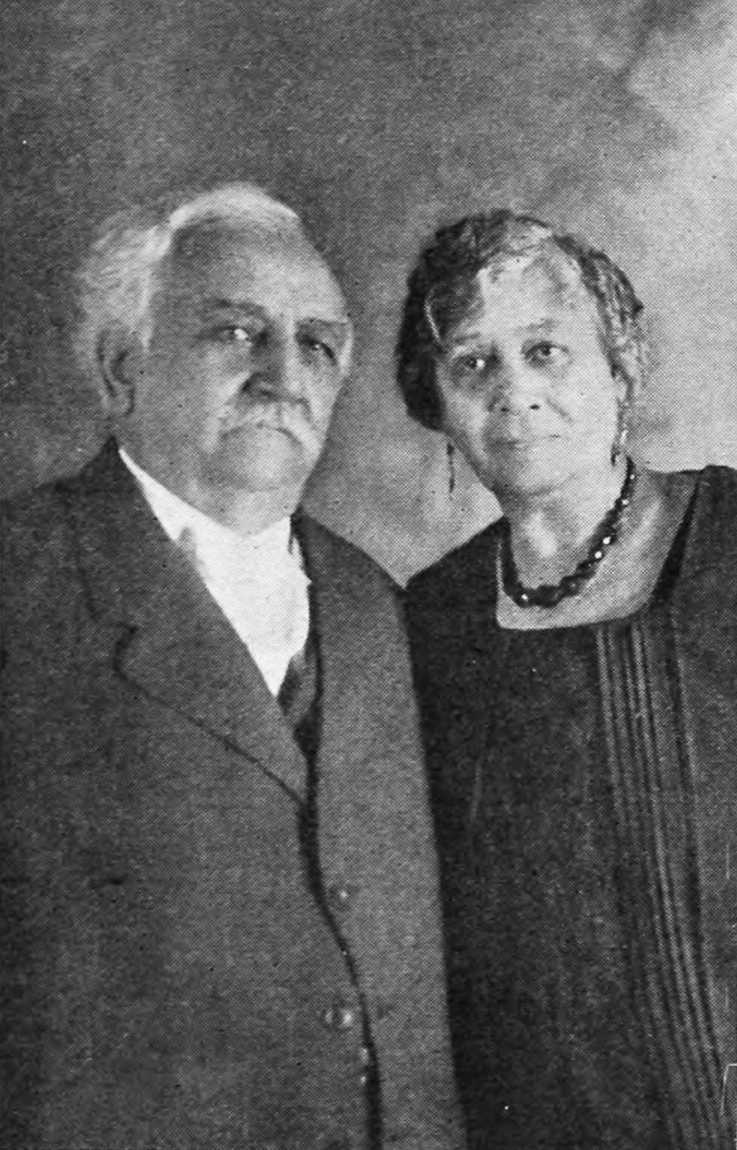
Miller with his wife, ca. 1924

He was also a delegate to the 1895 South Carolina constitutional convention called by the white supremacist governor, Benjamin Tillman. Historian Michael Perman wrote that "in no other state was a single public figure identified so vividly and indisputably with disfranchisement." Tillman and other Democratic leaders intended to go beyond the statutes to eliminate black voting.

The new constitution was one of a number passed in southern states at the turn of the century that were designed to effectively disfranchise African-American citizens by changes to voter registration rules. South Carolina's version required longer residency, literacy tests administered by white supervisors, poll taxes, and $300 worth of property. Miller, Murray and four other black delegates to the convention opposed the document and refused to ratify it. They drew national attention to the issues by publishing accounts in the New York World newspaper. The Democrats passed the constitution and effectively disfranchised most black voters for more than half a century, which also disqualified them from serving on juries or holding local office.

Miller did gain the support of Tillman to establish a land-grant college for African Americans in the segregated state school system. In 1896, the Colored Normal, Industrial, Agricultural, and Mechanical College of South Carolina was created in Orangeburg. The historically black college developed into South Carolina State University.

Appointed by the governor as the College's first president, Miller resigned as state representative. He continued to be politically active and, in 1910, opposed the election of Coleman Blease as governor. After his victory, Blease forced Miller's resignation because of his opposition.

Miller moved from Orangeburg back to Charleston, where he worked on various community causes. Supporting United States participation in World War I, he helped recruit 30,000 black men to the Armed Services.

From 1923 to 1934, Miller lived in Philadelphia, but he returned to Charleston. He died on April 8, 1938. He asked for the following to be inscribed on his gravestone: "Not having loved the white less, but having felt the Negro needed me more", related to his work for civil rights and his decision to identify as African American rather than white.

== See also ==
- List of African-American United States representatives

U.S. House of Representatives
| Preceded by William Elliott | Member of the U.S. House of Representatives from South Carolina's 7th congressional district September 24, 1890 - March 3, 1891 | Succeeded by William Elliot |
Academic offices
| Preceded by New position | President of Colored Normal, Industrial, Agricultural, and Mechanical College of South Carolina; 1896-1911 | Succeeded by Robert Shaw Wilkinson |
