= Jamie McGowan =

Jamie McGowan may refer to:

- Jamie McGowan (footballer, born 1970), English footballer
- Jamie McGowan (footballer, born 1997), Scottish footballer

== See also ==
- James McGowan (disambiguation)
