= Charles Angus Cooke =

Iroquois civil servant and ethnologist

- Thawennensere
- Born: March 22, 1870; Oka, Quebec
- Died: April 12, 1958
- Spouse(s): Edith Susan Day (w. 1915), Minnie Florence Day (m. 1919)
- Children: Sidney, Minola, Kathleen

Charles Angus Cooke (1870–1958), known as Thawennensere, was an Iroquois civil servant in the Government of Canada. He is most known for his publication Onkweonwe, which was a Mohawk-language newspaper. Cooke is also referred to for his ethnology work in recording more than 6,000 names Iroquoian names with phonetic spellings.

== Early life and career beginnings ==
Born in Oka, Quebec, to Adonhgnundagwen (He-has-left-the-Point-of-land), also known as Angus Cooke, Charles worked as a lumberer, and later as an interpreter for his father in Ottawa. Though Charles was planning on attending McGill University to study medicine, officials took notice of his skill set during his time in Ottawa, and he was recruited for service at the Department of Indian Affairs.

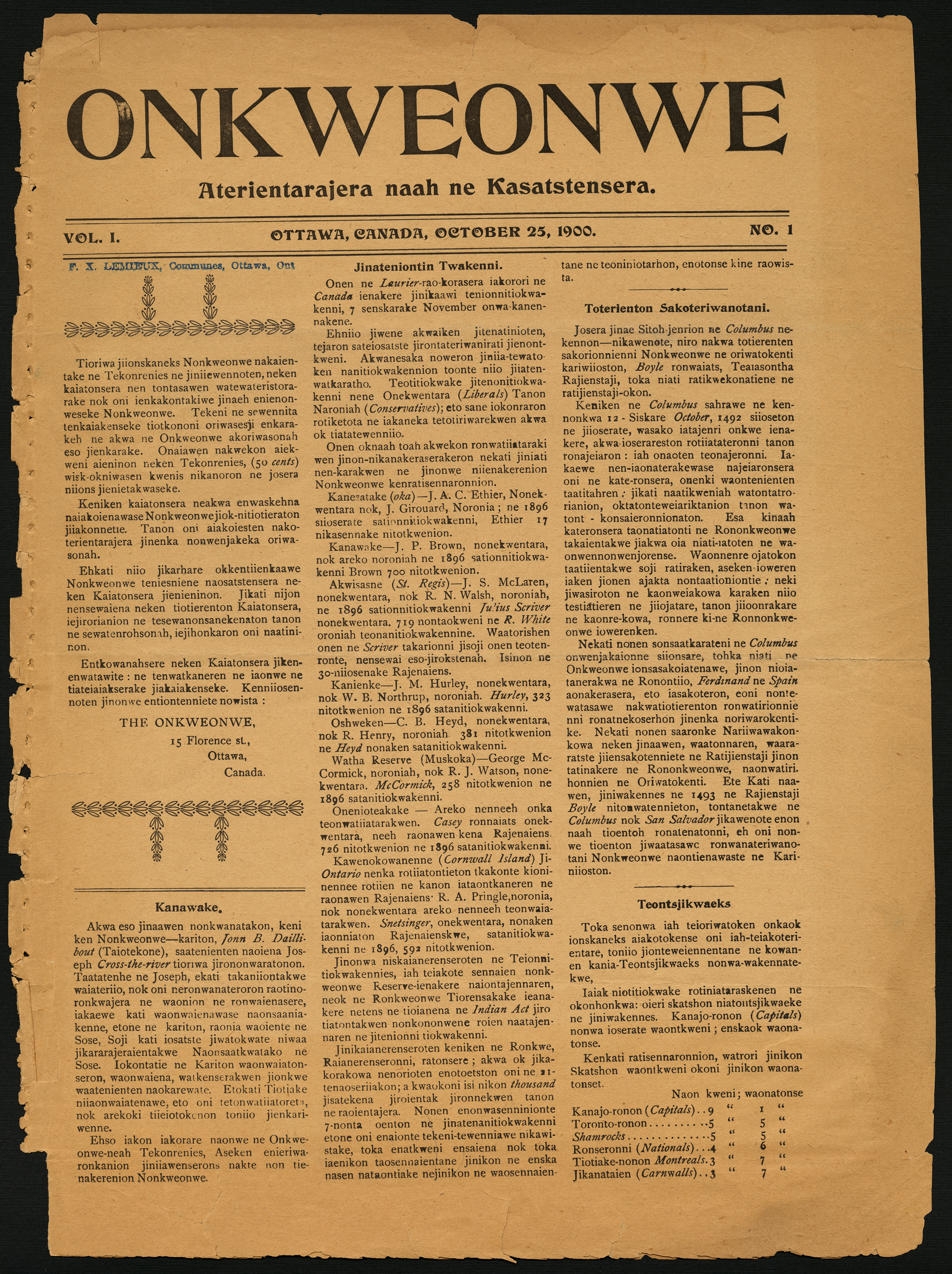
Onkweonwe newspaper issue dated October 25, 1900

== Notable contributions ==
- American Philosophical Society's collection The Cayuga Dialect of Iroquois
- Iroquois Personal Names, 1900-1951
