= Ira De Augustine Reid =

American sociologist (1901–1968)

- Born: July 2, 1901; Clifton Forge, Virginia, United States
- Died: August 15, 1968 (aged 67); Bryn Mawr, Pennsylvania, United States
- Other name: Ira D. Reid
- Education: Morehouse College (B.A.), University of Pittsburgh (M.A.), Columbia University (Ph.D.)
- Occupations: Sociologist, educator
- Known for: African American immigrants and communities
- Spouse(s): Gladys Russell Scott (m.?–1956; her death), Anne Margaret Cooke (m. 1958–1968; his death)
- Relatives: William Wilson Cooke (father in-law), Lloyd Miller Cooke (brother in-law)

Ira De Augustine Reid (July 2, 1901 – August 15, 1968) was an American sociologist and educator, who wrote extensively on the lives of Black immigrants and communities in the United States. He was also influential in the field of educational sociology. He held faculty appointments at Atlanta University, New York University, and Haverford College, one of very few African American faculty members in the United States at white institutions during the era of "separate but equal" and the first to be awarded tenure at a prestigious Northern institution (Haverford).

== Early life and education ==
Reid was born in Clifton Forge, Virginia, the son of a Baptist minister, but grew up in Harrisburg and Germantown, Philadelphia. He was Black and attended integrated public schools.

Reid attended Morehouse College in Atlanta, Georgia, where he was recruited directly by President John Hope, receiving his Bachelor of Arts in 1922. He then graduated from the University of Pittsburgh in 1925 with a Master of Arts in Social Economics. In 1938 he received a Rosenwald Fellowship which enabled him to study at Columbia University where in 1939 he attained a PhD in sociology. His tenth book which he published in 1939, The Negro Immigrant, His Background, Characteristics and Social Adjustment 1899-1937, was based on his PhD thesis.

While attended for his masters degree at the University of Pittsburgh, Reid met and wed Gladys Russell Scott, with whom he adopted a child. In 1950, Reid and his wife joined the Society of Friends, in which Reid was very active with educational works. Gladys Russell Scott died in 1956, and Reid remarried, to Anna "Anne" Margaret Cooke in 1958.

== Career ==
Upon graduation from Morehouse College, Reid taught sociology and history at Texas College, followed by a year of teaching social science at Douglass High School in Huntington, West Virginia.

From 1924 to 1928, Reid worked for the New York branch of the National Urban League, where he began as an apprentice and then fellow, before serving as an industrial secretary alongside Charles S. Johnson. Johnson and Reid collected data for the 1928 National Interracial Conference, held in Washington, DC. Reid then succeeded Johnson as the director of research and as editor of the Urban League's publication, Opportunity.

Reid was appointed to a professorship of sociology at Atlanta University in 1934, hired by department chair W.E.B. Du Bois. During his time there, Reid was the founding director of the People's College (1942), an adult education program. From years 1944-1946 he served as chair of the Sociology department and editor (1944-1948) of the journal Phylon: The Atlanta University Review of Race and Culture. Reid then spent one year as a visiting professor of educational psychology in New York University's School of Education, becoming the first black full-time faculty member at a white northern university during the time of "separate but equal."

Through the support of the American Friends Service Committee in 1947, Reid joined the faculty at Haverford College, where he was the college's first black professor. He became the chair of the Department of Sociology and Anthropology in 1948, where he remained until retirement in 1966. During these years, he held visiting appointments at several universities, and served as a consultant and board member for sociological and educational initiatives and organizations, including the Pennsylvania Governor's Commission on Higher Education. From 1947 to 1950, Reid was the assistant editor of American Sociological Review and an officer of the Eastern Sociological Society and American Sociological Association.

In 1952 he helped Kenneth and Mamie Clark draft The Effects of Segregation and the Consequences of Desegregation: A Social Science Statement, which was signed by dozens of sociologists, psychologists and other social scientists and provided as a major piece of evidence in the Brown vs Board of Education Supreme Court case.

=== McCarthy Era controversy ===
The United States Department of State suspended Reid's passport from 1952 to 1954 for suspicion of "communist sympathies," based upon the scholarship that had gained him renown. Reid protested the allegations, and succeeded in securing the return of his passport.

== Death and legacy ==
Reid died of an illness on August 15, 1968, at age 67, in Bryn Mawr, Pennsylvania.

Haverford College's Black Cultural Center is named for Reid and was rededicated in February 2013. The New York Public Library's Schomburg Center for Research in Black Culture, Manuscripts, Archives and Rare Books Division maintains a collection of Reid's unpublished writings and correspondence.

== Scholarship ==
=== Thought ===
During his time at the Urban League, Reid produced a number of studies conducted with African American communities around the United States, particularly in Harlem, in addition to a wider variety of sociological studies.

Reid produced extensive scholarship on a variety of subjects, but is particularly renowned for his work with West Indian immigrants, as well as on youth and the sociology of education. Swedish historian Gunnar Myrdahl drew from Reid's pioneering Urban League studies of African American urban life for his own work, An American Dilemma.

In 1952 Reid was among 30 social scientists who signed a statement on the effects of segregation which was entered as part of the testimony of Brown v. Board of Education. After the 1954 Supreme Court Decision in Brown v. Board of Education, Reid edited a special issue of the Annals of the American Academy of Political and Social Science (March 1956), themed "Racial Desegregation and Integration."

In an April 18, 2016 op-ed in The Baltimore Sun, Haverford College alumnus and former United States Attorney for the District of Maryland Stephen H. Sachs writes of Reid as a professor:

Ira Reid's sociology course was by far the most stimulating of the year. Part provocative lecturer, part maestro of the Socratic method, he introduced us to the irreconcilable worlds of heredity and environment. He confronted us with the iconic works of the anthropologist Margaret Mead, and he challenged us to write an essay on the subject of 'blood will tell.'

== Publications ==
- The Negro Population of Albany, New York (1928)
- Negro in American Civilization: A Study of Negro Life and Race Relations in the Light of Social Research (1930) (with Charles Spurgeon Johnson)
- Social Conditions of the Negro in the Hill District of Pittsburgh (1930)
- Negro Membership in American Labor Unions (1930)
- The Negro Community of Baltimore—Its Social and Economic Conditions (1935)
- Adult Education Among Negroes (1936)
- The Urban Negro Worker in the United States, 1925-1936 (vol. 1, 1938)
- The Negro Immigrant: His Background, Characteristics and Social Adjustment, 1899-1937 (1939)
- In a Minor Key: Negro Youth in Story and Fact (1940)
- Sharecroppers All (1941), with Arthur Raper
