= Lloyd Miller Cooke =

American industrial chemist, researcher (1916–2001)

- Born: June 7, 1916; LaSalle, Illinois, United States
- Died: October 3, 2001 (aged 85); Oberlin, Ohio, United States
- Education: University of Wisconsin–Madison (B.S.), McGill University (Ph.D.)
- Occupation: Chemist
- Father: William Wilson Cooke
- Relatives: Anne Cooke Reid (sister), Ira De Augustine Reid (brother in-law), Thomas Ezekiel Miller (maternal grandfather)
- Awards: William Procter Prize for Scientific Achievement (1970)

Lloyd Miller Cooke (1916 – 2001) was an American industrial chemist and researcher. He was an early African American chemist specialized in cellulose and carbohydrate chemistry, and worked in a leadership role for many years at Union Carbide Corporation (now Union Carbide) chemical company.

== Early life and education ==
Lloyd Miller Cooke was born on June 7, 1916, in LaSalle, Illinois, to Black parents Anne (née Miller), and noted architect, William Wilson Cooke. His sister was Anne Cooke Reid, a noted stage director and academic. His maternal grandfather was Thomas Ezekiel Miller, a state legislator in South Carolina and founder of the Colored Normal, Industrial, Agricultural, and Mechanical College of South Carolina (now South Carolina State University).

Cooke graduated with a B.S. degree in 1937, from the University of Wisconsin–Madison; and a Ph.D. in 1941 in organic chemistry, from McGill University in Montreal, Quebec, Canada.

== Career ==
Cooke began his career working in starch research at the Corn Products Refining Company (now Ingredion), an ingredient manufacturer in Illinois. In 1946, he joined the Visking Corporation in Chicago, where he worked on researching carbohydrate chemistry. He was promoted in 1954 to assistant manager of the technical department, and worked in a broader research capacity. The Visking Corporation was merged into the Union Carbide Corporation in 1957, and he was promoted to assistant director of their Chicago office. In 1965, Cooke was promoted to manager of marketing research, followed by a promotion in 1967 to manager of planning.

In 1969, Cooke contributed to the United States House Committee on Energy and Commerce's Subcommittee on Environmental Improvement publication, Cleaning Our Environment: The Chemical Basis of Action (1969), written for legislators and environmentalists. Cooke was awarded the William Procter Prize for Scientific Achievement in 1970, given by Scientific Research Society of America from Dr. Richard T. Arnold, for his work on Cleaning Our Environment (1969).

From 1970 until 1978, Cooke was the director of urban affairs at Union Carbide.

President Gerald Ford named Cooke as one of the seven chosen scientists to head the National Science Board in 1976, a role held until 1982. Cooke's role at the National Science Board was succeeded by physicist Roland W. Schmitt.

He was a member of the National Academy of Sciences; and served as the president of the National Action Council for Minorities in Engineering (NACME, Inc.).

Cooke died on October 3, 2001, in Oberlin, Ohio.

== Publications ==
- Subcommittee on Environmental Improvement (1969). Cleaning Our Environment: The Chemical Basis of Action. Washington, D.C.: American Chemical Society.
