= Charles Cook (footballer, born 1898) =

Scottish footballer

Personal information
- Full name: Charles Cook
- Date of birth: 3 June 1898
- Place of birth: Glasgow, Scotland
- Height: 5 ft 8 in (1.73 m)
- Position: Outside left

Senior career*
Years	Team	Apps	(Gls)
- Bellshill Athletic
1920–1922	Bradford City	7	(0)
1922	Bury	1	(0)
1924	Wigan Borough	3	(0)
1924	Coventry City	3	(0)
1924–1925	Bradford Park Avenue	2	(0)
- * Club domestic league appearances and goals

Charles Cook (born 3 June 1898) was a Scottish professional footballer who played as an outside left.

== Career ==
Born in Glasgow, Cook played for Bellshill Athletic, Bradford City, Bury, Wigan Borough, Coventry City and Bradford Park Avenue. For Bradford City he made 7 appearances in the Football League, as well as 1 FA Cup appearance.

== Sources ==
- Frost, Terry (1988). Bradford City A Complete Record 1903-1988. Breedon Books Sport. ISBN 0-907969-38-0.
