= Martin Cooke =

Martin Cooke may refer to:

- Martin Cooke (baritone), opera singer
- Martin Cooke (mayor) (c. 1872–1944), mayor of Hoboken, New Jersey, 1912–1915

== See also ==
- Marty Cook (born 1947), American jazz trombonist
