= Suzette Cooke =

American politician (born 1949)

Member of the Washington House of Representatives from the 47th district
- In office 1993–1999

Personal details
- Born: August 27, 1949 (age 76) Bellingham, Washington
- Party: Republican

Suzette Allen Cooke (born August 27, 1949) is an American politician. She is a Republican, and represented District 47 in the Washington House of Representatives from 1993 to 1999, which included comprising all or part of Black Diamond, Auburn, Covington, Maple Valley, Kent and Renton. She ran unsuccessfully against Ron Sims for King County Executive in 1997. Cooke was mayor of Kent, Washington from 2005 to 2017. She was married to David Cooke.
