= Wilson Cooke =

American politician (1819–1887)

South Carolina House of Representatives
- In office 1868–1870

Personal details
- Born: 1819 Greenville, South Carolina, U.S.
- Died: 1887 (aged 67–68)
- Spouse: Magdalena Walker
- Children: William Wilson Cooke
- Parent: Vardry McBee (father)

Wilson Cooke (1819 – 1887) was an American politician, minister, and businessman. He was a member of the South Carolina House of Representatives during the Reconstruction era, serving from 1868 until 1870. A historical marker in Greenville commemorates his life.

== Biography ==
Wilson Cooke was born in 1819, a slave. His father is thought to be Vardry McBee, and his mother was enslaved.

He was a Methodist, and he helped co-found the Greenville Methodist Church, a Black church in 1862. Cooke became a general store owner and had a tannery. He was a delegate at the 1868 South Carolina Constitutional Convention in Charleston. He represented Greenville County in the South Carolina House of Representatives from 1868 to 1870.

Cooke was married to Magdalena Walker. His son William Wilson Cooke was an architect and educator, who worked for the U.S. government before establishing his own practice in Gary, Indiana.
