= Samuel Cooke and Co =

Samuel Cooke and Co (Cooke Fuels) founded in 1845 was an oil and fuel delivery and manufacture service based in Padiham, Lancashire. In July 2012 the company entered administration and closed.

With origins in the Lubricants industry and in particular supplying the local cotton mills. Over the years Cooke developed a specialist lubricants business before moving into fuel distribution. Through strong relationships with major oil companies such as BP & Shell a successful fuel cards business grew and was subsequently sold.

The company focused on the sale and distribution of fuel and lubricants from three locations, Padiham, Barnsley and Stanlow (Mersey Oils).

The customer base ranged from domestic and retail through agricultural, industrial and distribution. The company had a contract to deliver Texaco branded fuels.

The company had a large fleet of fuel tankers. These ranged from smaller local tankers to large vehicles with up to 40,000 litre capacity.

For the 2009/2010 football season the company were sponsors of Burnley F.C. the company logo appearing on the team shirts and other material.
