= Charles Cook (academic) =

Mathematician (1843–1910)

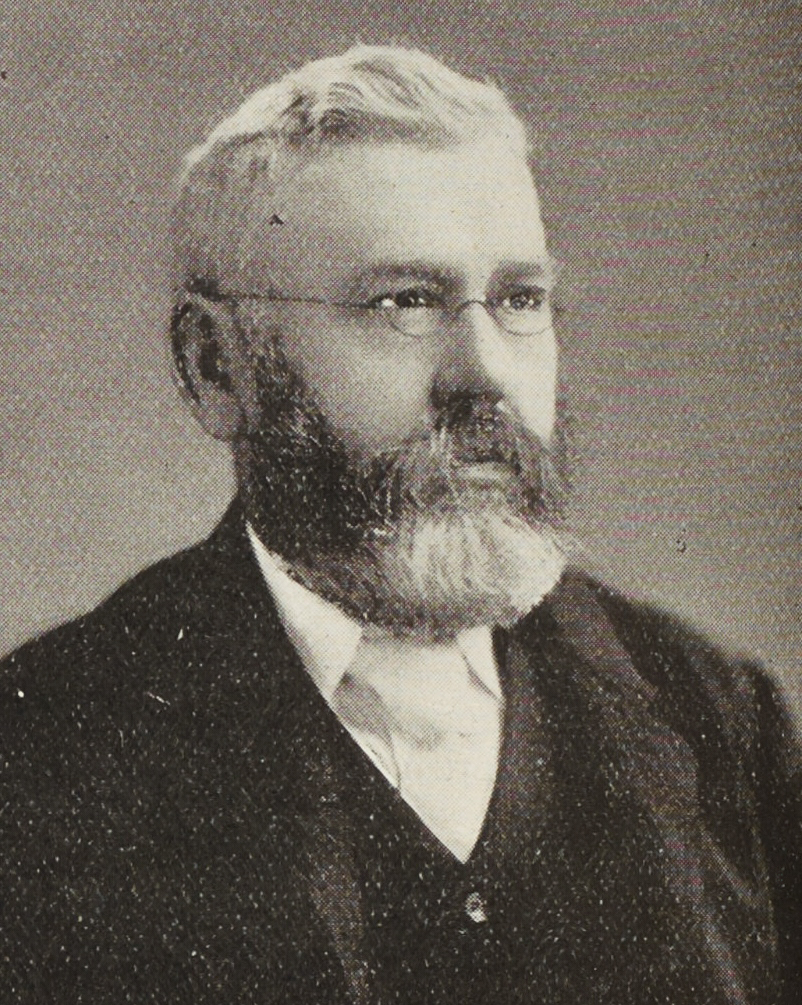
Portrait of Cook

Charles Henry Herbert Cook (30 September 1843 – 21 May 1910) was an English-born, Australian-raised, New Zealand-based mathematician. He was born in Kentish Town, Middlesex, England, on 30 September 1843, but educated in Melbourne, Australia, where he got a BA and an LLB from University of Melbourne. He then went to St John's College, Cambridge, initially to train for the English Bar but became interested in mathematics.

In 1874, a year before being due to be called to the bar, Cook was appointed founding head of mathematics at Canterbury College, University of New Zealand (now Canterbury University). He joined co-founders John Macmillan Brown and Alexander Bickerton in Christchurch, New Zealand, and initially focused on Latin and mathematics. He was also involved in promoting the establishment of the University's engineering school. He is remembered primarily for his teaching; Nobel Prize–winning physicist Ernest Rutherford cited him as an influence:

Cook was evidently a sound mathematician and an excellent teacher along orthodox lines, with no marked tendency to stray from those lines.

He was involved in secondary education, acting as an examiner for the New Zealand Department of Education and holding a fellowship at the Anglican Christ's College, Christchurch from 1891 to 1908.

Cook was a member of the Royal Commission on Higher Education 1878–1800 and a member of the senate of the University of New Zealand.

In 1903, Cook appeared in the vanity press The Cyclopedia of New Zealand, with a photo and short article. He died in Marton, New Zealand, on 21 May 1910.

== Cook Memorial Prize ==
After his death in 1910 a memorial prize was established, with Ernest Rutherford among the contributors.

Year	Recipient
1912?	Henry S. Richards
1934	T. E. Easterfield
1940	I. E. Robertson
1941?	Alister McLellan
1947	David Spence
1993	Alistair O'Malley
1994	Michael Burns
1995	Chris Tuffley
1996	Jon Cherrie and Kahn Mason
1997	Brian Bull
1998	James McGowan
1999	Clare McLennan Nigel Sinclair
2000	Hannah Sutherland
2001	Daniel Myall
2002	Philip Daniel
2003	Ronald Begg
2005	Maarten Jordens
2006	James Roscoe
2007	Timothy Candy
2008	Ashley Lightfoot
2009	Thomas Steinke
2010	Nicholas Brettell and James Hadfield
2011	Thomas Li
2012	Simon Todd
2013	Jamie de Jong, Andreas Kempe and Joshua Smith
2014	Carolyn Irons
