= Fred Cooke (footballer) =

English footballer

Personal information
- Full name: Frederick Robert Cooke
- Date of birth: 5 July 1896
- Place of birth: Kirkby-in-Ashfield, England
- Date of death: 1976 (aged 79–80)
- Place of death: Kirkby-in-Ashfield, England
- Position: Forward

Senior career*
Years	Team	Apps	(Gls)
1914–1919	East Kirkby		
1919–1921	Sunderland	12	(5)
1921–1923	Swindon Town	33	(14)
1923–1924	Accrington Stanley	25	(5)
1924–19??	Bangor City		
- * Club domestic league appearances and goals

Frederick Robert Cooke (5 July 1896 – 1976) was an English professional footballer who played as a forward for Sunderland.
