= Samuel Albert Cook =

American physician

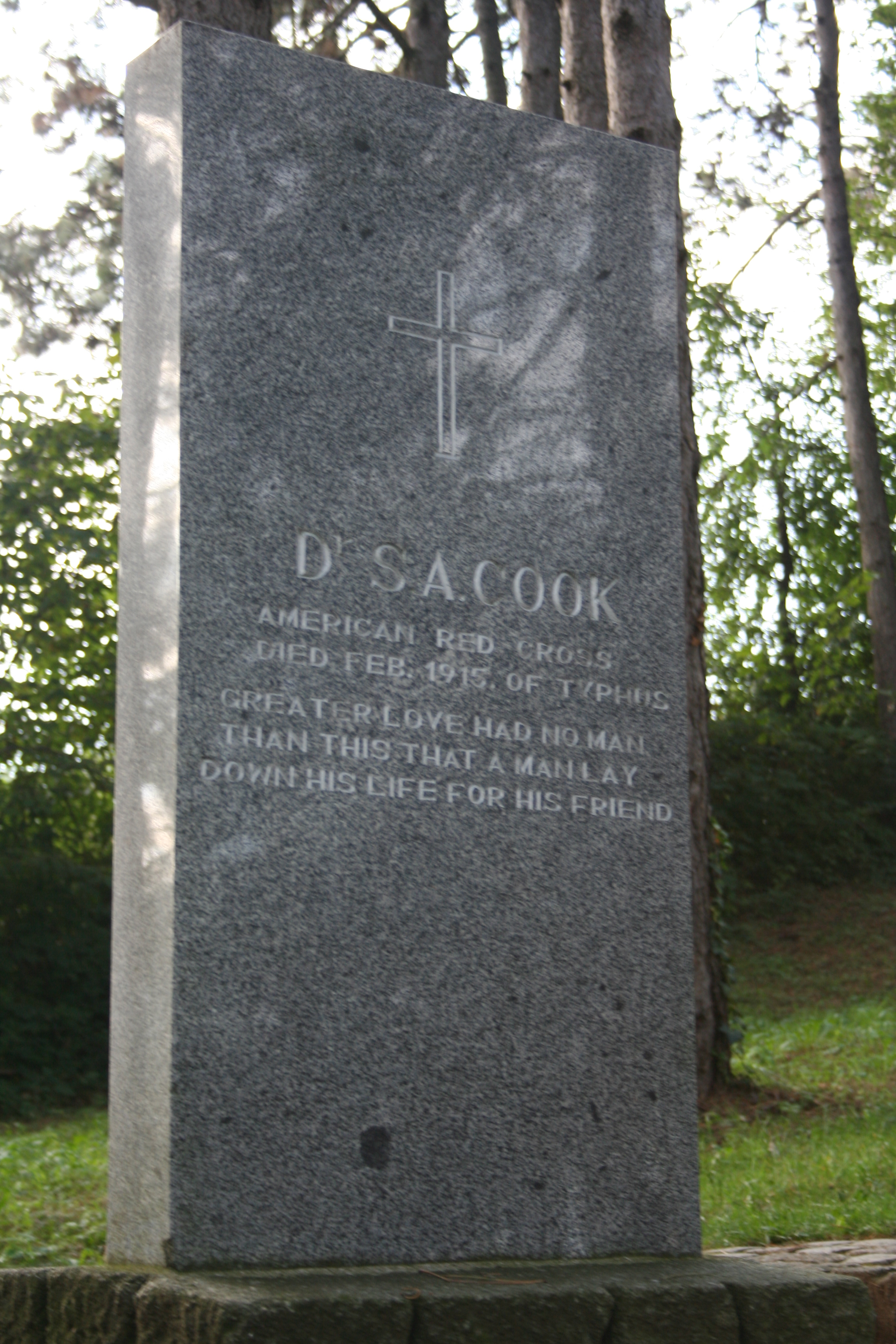
Tomb of Samuel Albert Cook in Valjevo.

Samuel Albert Cook (May 3, 1878 – February 10, 1915) was a medical doctor and member of the American Red Cross mission in Serbia during First World War.

Dr. Samuel Albert Cook was born on May 3, 1878, in Whitehall, New York. He completed his medical studies, lived and worked in his homeland until 1915, when, as a member of the American Medical Mission, he came to the aid of Serbian small and poorly equipped military medical sanity. He was particularly involved in the vaccination of ill-affected of typhus in Valjevo hospital, which actually consisted of two primary, one military, six reserve and a large number of field hospitals. From December 1914 to May 1915 in Serbia, during the typhoid epidemic, 35,000 Serbian soldiers, 35,000 prisoners and 120,000 civilians died. The focus point of the disease was Valjevo, in which nearly ten thousand people died from the end of December 1914 to the beginning of May 1915. The casualties included 3,500 Serb soldiers, 4,000 civilians and 2,000 Austro-Hungarian prisoners, and hundreds of sick died daily during the epidemic.

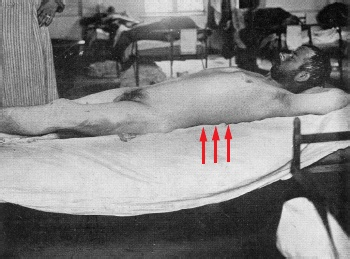
Patients affected by typhus in a Valjevo Hospital in 1915.

During the epidemic, all buildings in the city, including hotels, schools and cafes became hospital wards, and the streets and non-urbanized parts of the neighborhood were hospital corridors. As early as mid-December 1914, the number of patients had risen to 7,000 patients, and at the height of the epidemic, during January and February 1915, the disease peaked. A decisive role in the suppression of the typhoid epidemic in Serbia had the American mission and was headed by one of the most significant epidemiologists of the time, Richard Strong, a professor at Harvard. His crew had more than forty doctors and paramedics.

Cook died of typhoid, treating diseased Serbian soldiers. In Valjevo, a street is named after him.

== See also ==
- William Hunter
- Ludwik Hirszfeld
