= Anne Cooke Reid =

African American stage director and academic (1907–1997)

- Anne M. Cooke, circa 1920
- Born: Anna Margaret Cooke; October 6, 1907; Washington, D.C., U.S.
- Died: 1997 (aged 89–90); U.S.
- Education: Oberlin College Yale School of Drama
- Occupations: Stage director; academic
- Years active: 1920s–1980s
- Known for: Founded the first Black summer theater in the U.S.
- Spouse: Ira De Augustine Reid (m. 1958; died 1968)
- Father: William Wilson Cooke
- Relatives: Lloyd Miller Cooke (brother), Thomas Ezekiel Miller (maternal grandfather)

Anne Cooke Reid (née Anna Margaret Cooke; October 6, 1907 – 1997) was an American stage director and academic. She founded and led theater departments at historically Black universities including Howard University, where she was the first chairwoman, and Spelman College, where she founded the first Black summer theater in the United States. A prominent figure in theater education, Cooke Reid was known to her students as "Queen Anne"; historian Darlene Clark Hine called her "a major figure responsible for providing high-quality training" during the mid-1900s.

== Early life and education ==
Anna "Anne" Margaret Cooke was born on October 6, 1907, in Washington, DC. Her father was architect William Wilson Cooke. Her brother was noted chemist, Lloyd Miller Cooke. She graduated from high school in Gary, Indiana, and at the age of 16 attended Oberlin College, where she received a Bachelor of Arts degree in 1928. Cooke became a charter member of the Omega chapter of Alpha Kappa Alpha sorority in 1925. In 1944, she received her Ph.D. in theater from the Yale University School of Drama.

== Career ==
Cooke taught at North Carolina A&T State University, then took a post in 1927 at Spelman College in Atlanta, Georgia, where she was the first director of record to lead the Spelman Players troupe. Among her productions was a pageant about Spelman's history told with music, dance, and dialogue, with a cast of female Spelman students as well as male students from sister school Morehouse College, and later Atlanta University. In 1934, Cooke and these institutions organized the Atlanta University Summer Theater, the oldest continually operating summer theater and the first Black summer theater in the United States. The troupe, which produced five plays in six weeks, developed a repertoire including celebrated plays like Thornton Wilder's Our Town; although fewer works by Black playwrights were well known at the time, the troupe produced at least one. The theater ran for 44 seasons, ending in 1977.

In 1942, Cooke led the Hampton Institute (present-day Hampton University)'s Hampton Communications Theater. Two years later, she was hired by Howard University to establish the college's theater department along with Owen Dodson and James W. Butcher, and became the chairwoman. Cooke would remain head of the department until 1957. One of her notable students was the novelist Toni Morrison who entered the drama program at Howard two years after it was established in 1949. Some of her other pupils at Howard included actresses Roxie Roker and Zaida Coles, stage director and playwright Shauneille Perry, and actor Graham Brown.

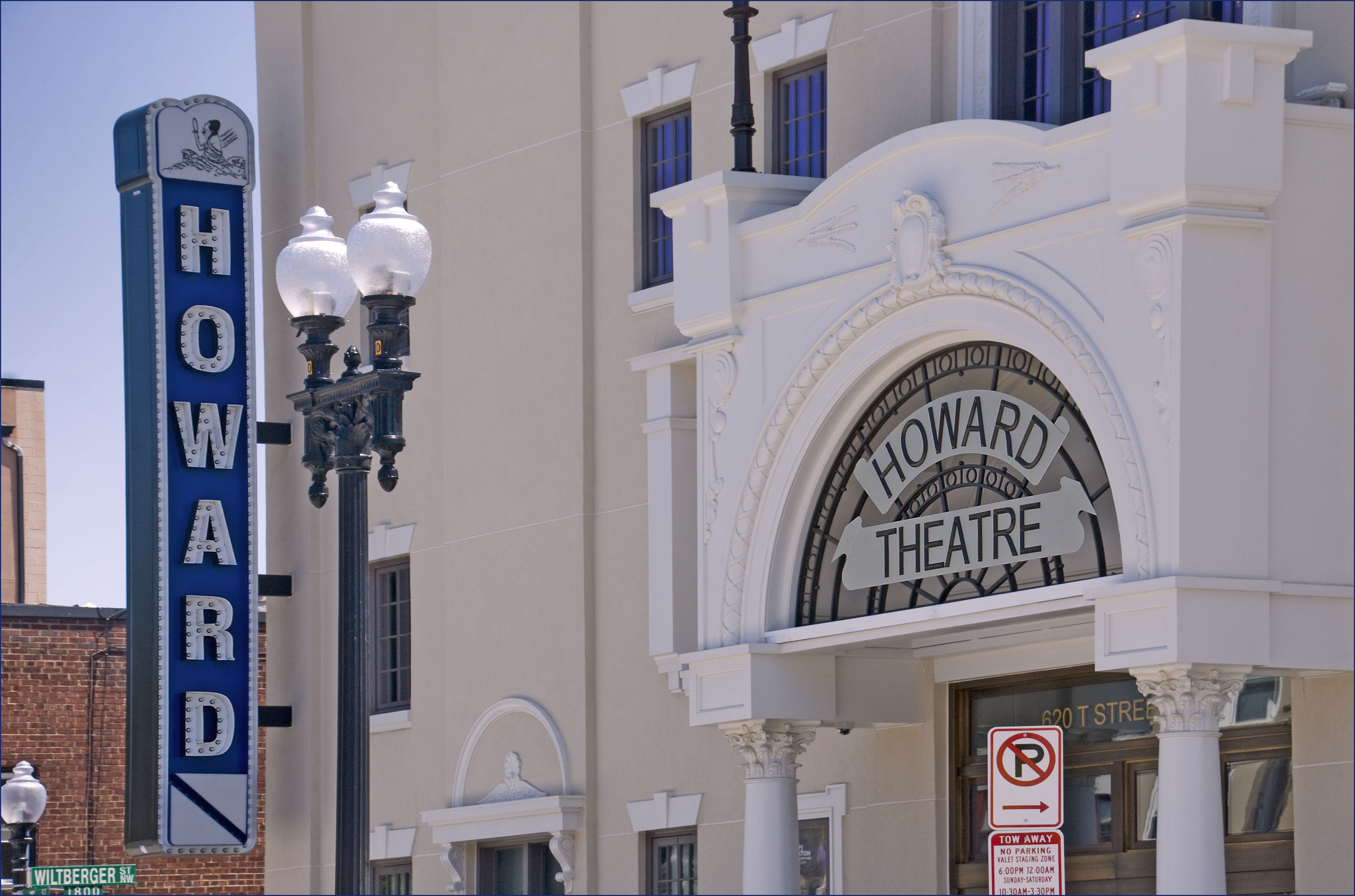
The Howard Theatre, home of the Howard University Players in the 1940s and 50s, in 2012.

At Howard, Cooke Reid aspired to create a drama program that would train students to become professional actors—a field that, in the 1940s, many Black students and faculty thought to be near-impenetrable. Her tenure began a revival for theater at the university. The Howard University Players, who were active during the 1920s, toured Norway, Sweden, Denmark and Germany in 1949 as ambassadors of goodwill for the United States Department of State—the first college theater group to do so. The Howard Players produced Henrik Ibsen's The Wild Duck with an almost entirely Black cast, as well as Dorothy and DuBose Heyward's Mamba's Daughters. Her productions were praised by critics abroad, and upon returning to the United States, a Washington Post editorial praised the endeavor itself: "They appeared not as representatives of their race but as representatives of theater art. They served their country well."

In May 1969, Cooke Reid coordinated a meeting at Haverford College along with psychologist Kenneth Clark of fourteen prominent African American intellectuals to advocate for racial integration. These participants, including author Ralph Ellison, United States circuit judge William H. Hastie, economist Phyllis Ann Wallace, and US secretary of housing and urban development Robert C. Weaver, were known as the Haverford Group.

Cooke Reid was a contributing author to the second volume of Notable American Women, 1607–1950: A Biographical Dictionary (1971, Harvard University Press). When she retired from Howard, she was hired as senior preceptor for student affairs by University of California, Santa Cruz, and then as senior professor of theater at University of Maryland, Baltimore County. She received the Mister Brown Award for her contributions to the theater arts from the National Conference on African American Theater in 1987.

== Personal life ==
On August 12, 1958, Anne Cooke married sociologist Ira De Augustine Reid, who at the time was a widower with a teenage daughter.
