= John Cook =

John Cook may refer to:

== Entertainment ==
- John Cook (filmmaker) (1935–2001), Austrian filmmaker
- John Cook (musician) (1918–1984), English organist
- John Kingsley Cook (1911–1994), English artist

== Military ==
- John Pope Cook (1825–1910), American Civil War general
- John Cook (Scottish soldier) (1843–1879), British soldier and recipient of the Victoria Cross
- John Cook (soldier, born 1847) (1847–1915), American Civil War soldier and Medal of Honor recipient
- John H. Cook (1840–1916), English soldier who fought in the American Civil War

== Politics ==
=== Canada ===
- John Cook (Upper Canada politician) (1791–1877)
- John Henry Cook (1902–1980), provincial politician in Ontario, Canada

=== Honduras ===
- John Arnold Cook, on List of members of the National Congress of Honduras, 2006–10

=== United Kingdom ===
- John Coke (fl. 1390) or John Cook, in 1390, Member of Parliament (MP) for Truro
- John Cook (fl. 1393), in 1393, MP for Newcastle-under-Lyme
- John Cook (fl. 1542), MP for Orford
- John Cook (regicide) (1608–1660), English Solicitor General executed for regicide

=== United States ===
- John Cook (governor) (1730–1789), American farmer and governor of Delaware
- John Parsons Cook (1817–1872), US Representative from Iowa
- John C. Cook (1846–1920), US representative and district judge from Iowa
- John Dillard Cook (1792–1852), justice of the Supreme Court of Missouri
- John Cook (Texas politician) (born 1946), mayor of El Paso, Texas
- John R. Cook (born 1944), member of the Texas House of Representatives

== Religion ==
- John Cook (Canadian minister) (1805–1892), Canadian clergyman and educator
- John Cook (professor, born 1739) (1739–1815), Scottish professor and a minister of the Church of Scotland
- John Cook (moderator 1816) (1770–1824), moderator of the General Assembly of the Church of Scotland 1816–1817
- John Cook (moderator 1859) (1807–1869), moderator of the General Assembly of the Church of Scotland 1859
- John Cook (Haddington) (1807–1874), moderator of the General Assembly of the Church of Scotland 1866–1867

== Science ==
- John Howard Cook (1872–1946), British physician, missionary, lecturer
- John Manuel Cook (1910–1994), British archaeologist
- John Call Cook (1918–2012), American geophysicist
- John Cook (Australian author), cognitive scientist and creator of SkepticalScience.com

== Sports ==
- John Cook (coach) (born 1956), American women's volleyball head coach
- John Cook (golfer) (born 1957), American professional golfer
- John Cook (Minnesota golfer), American golfer in the 1960s and 1970s, see Minnesota State Open
- John Cook (speedway rider) (born 1958), American professional motorcycle speedway rider, world finalist
- John Cook (cricketer) (1946–2007), English cricketer
- John Cook (rugby league) (born 1941), Australian rugby league player

== Other ==
- John Cook (pirate) (died 1684), English buccaneer and pirate
- John Cook (reporter), editor-in-chief of The Intercept
- John Douglas Cook (1808–1868), Scottish journalist, founding editor of the Saturday Review
- John Edwin Cook (1829–1859), participated in John Brown's raid on Harpers Ferry
- John F. Cook Sr. (1810–1855), American pastor and educator
- John F. Cook Jr. (1833–1910), American educator and civil rights activist
- John Hartwell Cook, American lawyer and Dean of Howard University School of Law
- John Williston Cook (1844–1922), American educator

== See also ==
- Cook (surname)
- John Coke (disambiguation) (pronounced Cook)
- John Cooke (disambiguation)
- Jonathan Cook (born 1965), British journalist based in Israel
