= John Cook (moderator 1859) =

Scottish minister

Personal details
- Born: John Cook; 1 September 1807
- Died: 17 April 1869 (aged 61)

minister of Laurencekirk 3rd Sept. 1829
- In office 3 September 1829 – 2 October 1845

minister of St Leonard's
- In office 2 October 1845 – 15 June 1860

Convener of General Assembly's Committee on Education 4th June 1849
- In office 4 June 1849 – 1850?

convener of the General Assembly's Committee on Improving the Condition of Parish Schoolmasters
- In office 3 June 1850 – 1851?

convener of the General Assembly's Committee on Aids to Devotion
- In office 1 June 1857 – 1858?

convener of the General Assembly's Committee on Army and Navy Chaplains
- In office 1859–1860?

convener of the General Assembly's Committee on Impressions of the Scriptures, Catechisms, etc.,
- In office 3 June 1861 – 1862?

Moderator of the General Assembly of the Church of Scotland
- In office 19 May 1859 – 1860

professor of church history, St. Andrews
- In office 15 June 1860 – 30 July 1868

Dean of the Chapel Royal
- In office 1863 – 30 July 1868

John Cook (1807–1869) was a Scottish minister and Professor of Church History who served as Moderator of the General Assembly of the Church of Scotland in 1859.

== Life ==
He was born in St Andrews on 1 September 1807 the son of Rev Prof John Cook and his wife, Elizabeth Hill, and grandson of Rev John Cook. He studied Divinity at St Andrews University and gained his MA in 1823. The following year he became a factor at St Mary's College in St Andrews. He was licensed to preach by the Presbytery of the Church of Scotland at Fordoun in 1828 and ordained as minister of Laurencekirk in 1829. In October 1845 he was translated to St Leonards Church in St Andrews. The University awarded him an honorary doctorate (DD) in 1848.

In 1849 he was Convenor of the General Assembly and sat on the committee for Improving the Condition of Parish Schoolteachers (which were largely run by the church) in 1850, and that on appointing Army and Navy Chaplains in 1859. In the same year he was elected Moderator of the General Assembly.

In 1860 Queen Victoria proposed him as Professor of Church History at St Andrews University. In 1863 she further appointed him Dean of the Chapel Royal.

He died on 17 April 1869.

== Family ==
He married 9 May 1837, Rachel Susan (born 15 June 1812, died 25 June 1894), daughter of William Farquhar, London, and had issue —

- Elizabeth, born 13 May 1838 (married (1) John Robertson, D.D., minister of St Mungo's, Glasgow : (2) Matthew Rodger, D.D., minister of St Leonard's)
- Isabella Farquhar, born 14 March 1841, died 21 May 1894
- Harriett, born 6 June 1843, died 19 May 1869
- Madeline, born 17 December 1845, (married Duncan Maclennan), died 17 June 1869
- Rachel Susan, born 1 February 1848 (married 20 May 1874, Charles Prestwick Scott, editor of the Manchester Guardian), died November 1905
- Marcia Sophia (married Andrew Stewart).

In 1837 he married Rachel Susan Farquhar, daughter of William Farquhar of London.

He was father to five daughters, the youngest being Rachel Cook (1848–1905) a social reformer.

His maternal uncle was Rev George Hill.

His brother was Rev George Cook.

Due to the high number of family members named "John Cook", most of which are of public note, the family tree is a complicated series of the same name, causing much confusion. Almost all members of the family served as a Moderator of the General Assembly at some time.

Cook Hill family tree
John Hill	George Hill	Janet Hill	John Cook (1739–1816)
Alexander Hill	Elisabeth Hill	John Cook (moderator 1816)	George Cook
John Cook (1807–1869)	John Cook (1807–1874)
Rachel Cook

== Publications ==
- Evidence on Church Patronage, being a Digest of Evidence given before the House of Commons (Edinburgh, 1838)
- A Letter on Church Defence Associations (Montrose, 1841)
- A Brief View of the Scottish System for Relief of the Poor (Edinburgh, 1841)
- Substance of a Speech delivered at a Meeting called by a Deputation from the Convocation (Edinburgh, 1843)
- A Catechism of Christian Instruction (Edinburgh, 1845)
- Farewell Sermon (Edinburgh, 1845)
- Six Lectures on Christian Evidences (Edinburgh, 1852)
- A Letter to a Member of Parliament on the Parochial Schools of Scotland (Edinburgh, 1854)
- Parish School Statistics (Edinburgh, 1854)
- Speech on the Lord Advocate's Education Bill (Edinburgh, 1855)
- Statement of Facts regarding the Parochial Schools of Scotland (London, 1855)
- Address at Opening of the St Andrews Graduates' Association (Cupar, 1858)
- Account of the Parish of Laurencekirk (New Statistical Account, xi.)
- Sermon XVI. (Church of Scotland Pulpit, i.)
