= John Cook (Haddington) =

Scottish minister

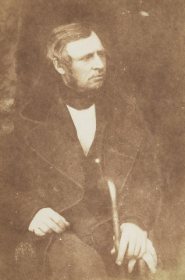

Personal details
- Born: John Cook; 12 September 1807
- Died: 11 September 1874 (aged 66)

minister of Cults
- In office 1 June 1832 – 19 December 1833

minister of Haddington (second charge)
- In office 19 December 1833 – 20 June 1843

minister of Haddington (first charge)
- In office 20 June 1843 – 6 August 1573

convener of the General Assembly's Committee on Education
- In office 27 May 1854 – 1854?

depute-clerk of Assembly 1859
- In office 1859–1862

principal clerk
- In office 1862–1874

Moderator of the General Assembly of the Church of Scotland
- In office 24 May 1866 – close

John Cook (1807–1874) was a Scottish minister who served as Moderator of the General Assembly of the Church of Scotland for the year 1866/67. In common with other members of the ecclesiastical family of Cook, he was a strong supporter of the moderate party in the Scottish church.

== Life ==
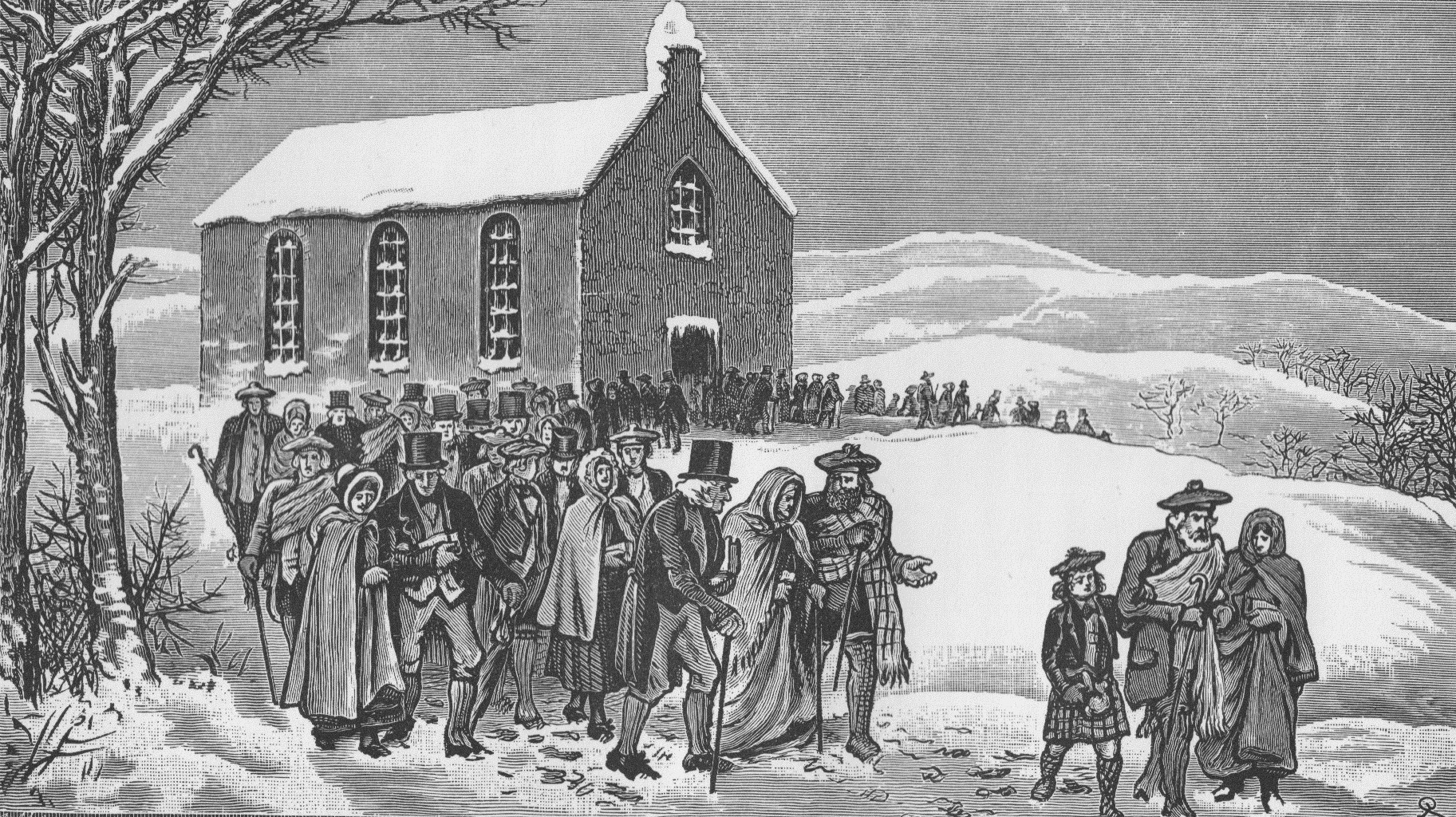
Parishioners walk out of church in protest at the unpopular appointment of a minister in the parish of Marnoch, Strathbogie in 1841

John Cook was born in Laurencekirk on 12 September 1807. He was the eldest son of George Cook (1772–1845) the local minister (afterwards Professor of Moral Philosophy at St Andrews), and his wife, Diana Shank. He was educated at Laurencekirk Parish School and the University of St Andrews. He was one of several children including George Cook, minister of Borgue. John followed in the family tradition and studied Divinity at St Andrews University. He graduated with an MA in 1823 and was licensed by the Presbytery of Fordoun on 17 September 1828. Initially he worked as an assistant to his father.

In 1827 his father served as Moderator of the General Assembly of the Church of Scotland following in the footsteps of his own father, John Cook who served in 1816.

In 1833 he became a minister of St Mary's in Haddington and remained in service in Haddington for 41 years.

A sentence of deposition having been passed by the general assembly (May 1841) on seven ministers of Strathbogie, who in a case of patronage upheld a decree of the court of session in opposition to the authority of the assembly, Cook was, on 10 May 1842, suspended by the assembly from judicial functions for nine months, for taking part in sacramental communion with the deposed ministers. His promotion to the first charge at Haddington immediately followed the disruption of 1843. Formerly Robert Lorimer was in the first charge. Lorimer was an Evangelical and Cook was a Moderate. In the same year the degree of D.D. was conferred on him by his university.

In 1866 he succeeded James Macfarlane as Moderator of the General Assembly. In 1867 he was succeeded in turn by Thomas Jackson Crawford. His position created the only grandfather-father-son sequence of Moderators in the Church of Scotland.

He died in Haddington on 11 September 1874, the day before his 67th birthday.

== Family ==
He married 14 July 1840, Helen (died 3 January 1860), daughter of Henry Davidson, sheriff-clerk of Haddingtonshire, and had issue —

- Martha Mary Chisholm, born 9 November 1841, died 17 March 1934
- Diana Shank, born 13 March 1843 (married John Forbes Watson Grant, M.A., minister of the Second Charge, Haddington, afterwards of St Stephen's, Edinburgh)
- Helen, born November 1848, died (Haddington) 17 May 1933
- Harriet Anne Scott, born 7 February 1854
- Louisa Frances, born 8 August 1856, died in infancy.

His great uncles included Rev George Hill and Prof John Hill.

Cook Hill family tree
John Hill	George Hill	Janet Hill	John Cook (1739–1815)
Alexander Hill	Elisabeth Hill	John Cook (moderator 1816)	George Cook
John Cook (1807–1869)	John Cook (1807–1874)
Rachel Cook

== Works ==
- Styles of Writs, Forms of Procedure, and Practice of the Church Courts of Scotland (Edinburgh, 1850, and various editions)
- Letter to an M.P. on the Parochial Schools of Scotland (Edinburgh, 1854)
- Speech upon the Parish Schools Bill (Edinburgh 1856)
- Remarks on the Recommendation and Draft Bill on Education (Edinburgh, 1868)
- Speech on the Scotch Education Bill, 1871.

== Artistic recognition ==
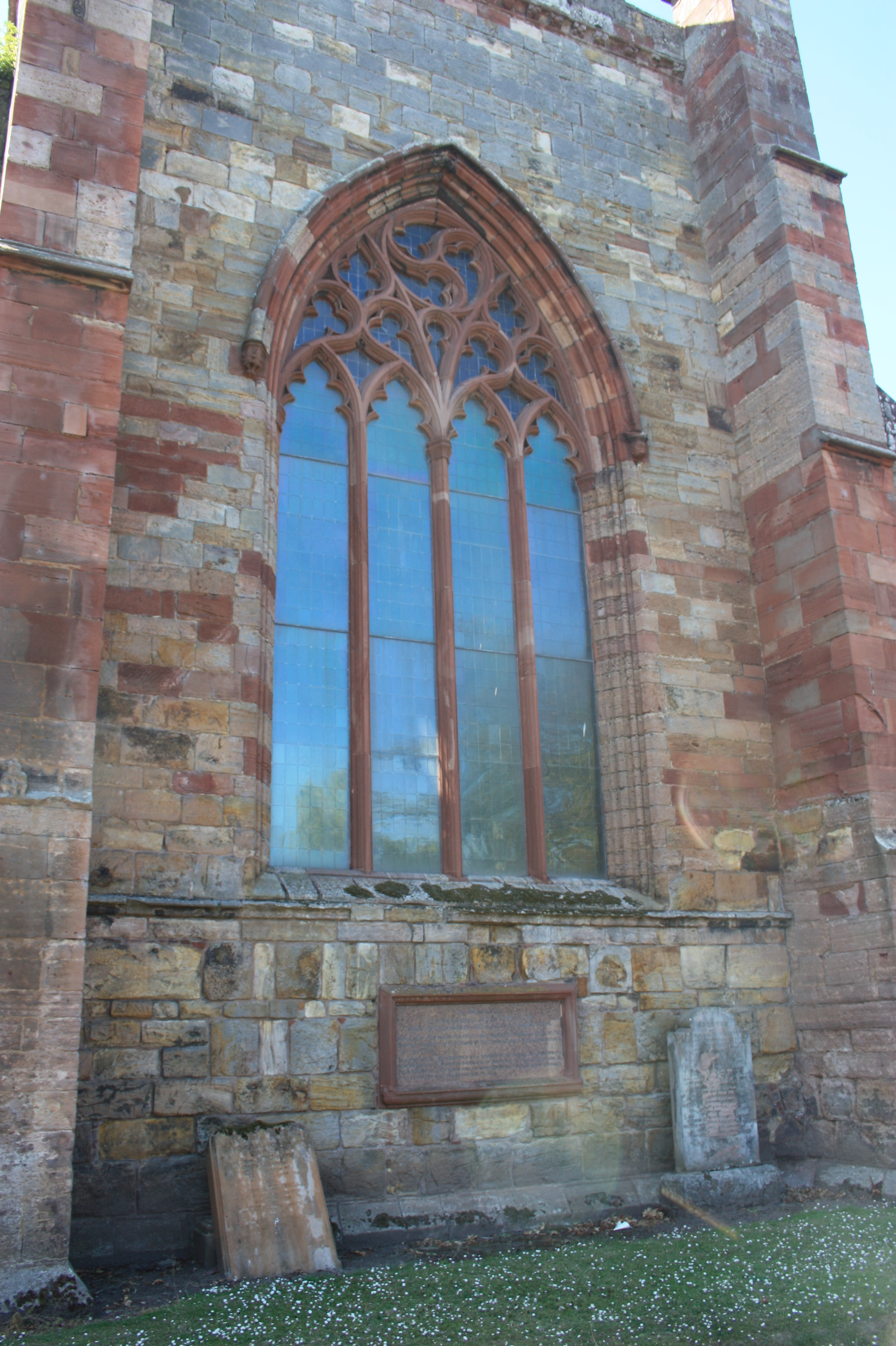
Memorial window and plaque to Cook, St Marys, Haddington

He was photographed by Hill & Adamson in 1866.

He was also painted by James Edgar (copied as a mezzotint by John Moffat).

== Memorials ==
The main east window in St Mary's Collegiate Church, Haddington was restored in his memory and this is marked by a granite plaque on the outer east side of the church.
