= John Cooke =

John Cooke may refer to:

== Politicians ==
- John R. Cooke (1788–1854), Virginia planter, lawyer and politician
- John Robert Cooke (1866–1934), political figure in Ontario
- John Herbert Cooke (1867–1943), Australian politician
- John B. Cooke (1885–1971), served in the California legislature
- John H. Cooke (1911–1998), New York politician and judge
- John Warren Cooke (1915–2009), American politician from Virginia
- John William Cooke (1919–1968), Argentine politician and revolutionary
- John Cooke (Colorado politician) (fl. 2000s–2020s)

== Sports ==
- John Cooke (Oxford University cricketer) (1808–1841), English cricketer
- John Cooke (Derbyshire cricketer) (1851–1908), English cricketer
- John Cooke (footballer, born 1878) (1878–1909), English professional footballer
- John Cooke (rower) (1937–2005), American rower at the 1956 Olympics
- John Cooke (sport shooter) (1939–2008), British sport shooter
- John Cooke (footballer, born 1942), English professional footballer
- John Cooke (footballer, born 1962), English professional footballer

== Other people ==
- John Cooke (composer), English composer with works in the Old Hall Manuscript
- John Cooke (fl. c. 1611), author of the play Greene's Tu Quoque
- John Cook (regicide) (1608–1660), English Solicitor General, prosecuted King Charles I
- John Cook (pirate) or John Cooke (died 1684), English pirate, associate of Edward Davis
- John J. Cooke (1874–1921), American actor of silent era
- John Cooke (Six Preacher) (1646/7–1726), Anglican clergyman
- John Cooke (judge) (1944–2022), Irish judge
- John Cooke (lawyer) (1666–1710), English lawyer
- John Cooke (bookseller) (1731–1810), English bookseller
- John Cooke (academic) (1734–1823), Vice-Chancellor of Oxford University
- John Cooke (physician) (1756–1838), British physician, Fellow of the Royal Society and of the Society of Antiquaries of London
- John Cooke (Royal Navy officer) (1763–1805), British captain killed at the Battle of Trafalgar
- John Cooke (entrepreneur) (1824–1882), American locomotive maker
- John Esten Cooke (1830–1886), American novelist, Confederate Army officer
- John Henry Cooke (1837–1917), English circus proprietor
- John Peyton Cooke (born 1967), American novelist
- John Rogers Cooke (1833–1891), Confederate general during the American Civil War
- John Starr Cooke (1920–1976), American mystic and spiritual teacher
- John Cooke (RAF officer) (1922–2011), British doctor and senior Royal Air Force officer
- John Byrne Cooke (1940–2017), American author, musician and photographer
- John Cooke (musician), English guitarist

== See also ==
- John Cook (disambiguation)
- John Coke (disambiguation) (pronounced Cook)
