= George Cook (moderator 1876) =

George Cook (1812–1888) was a minister of the Church of Scotland, who served as Moderator of the General Assembly in 1876.

He was part of the "Cook Dynasty" (mainly centred in St Andrews) and both his father and brother also served as Moderator.

== Life ==
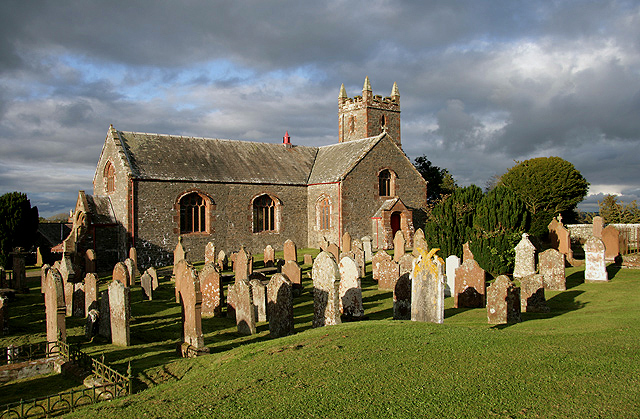
Borgue Parish Church

He was born in the manse of Laurencekirk on 11 June 1812, the son of George Cook who served as Moderator in 1825 and was later Professor of Moral Philosophy at St Andrews University. He was educated at Laurencekirk Parish School and then studied divinity at St Andrews University graduating MA around 1832. He was licensed to preach by the Presbytery of St Andrews in 1836.

His first clergical role was as assistant to James MacDonald at Kemback. In 1841, as part of the Church's Foreign Missions projects, he was ordained as a Church of Scotland Chaplain in Bombay in India. After 20 years in India he returned to Scotland as minister of Bathgate Parish Church. In May 1867 he translated to Borgue on the southwest coast of Scotland. In 1872 St Andrews University awarded him an honorary Doctor of Divinity.

In 1876 he succeeded James Sellar as Moderator of the General Assembly of the Church of Scotland the highest position in the Scottish Church. He was succeeded in turn by K. M. Phin.

He died on 29 February 1888.

== Family ==
In June 1842 he married Jane Halkett Pattullo (died 1886), daughter of Robert Pattullo of Balhouffie in Fife. Their children included:

- Charlotte Stewart Cook (born 1843)
- Rev George Cook (c.1845), minister of Longformacus
- Emily Cook (born 1848) married Rev. Dr. Alexander Irvine Robertson minister of Clackmannan
- Henry Shank Cook (born 1854) and his twin Diana both died in infancy

His maternal great uncles were George Hill (minister) and John Hill (classicist).

== Publications ==
- Light and Life (1877)
