= John Coke (disambiguation) =

John Coke (1563–1644) was an English politician, Lord Privy Seal.

John Coke may also refer to:

- John Coke (fl. 1390), MP for Truro (UK Parliament constituency) in 1390
- John Coke (died 1650) (1607–1650), MP for Derbyshire 1640–1650
- John Coke (died 1692) (1653–1692), MP for Derby 1685–1690
- John Coke (East India Company officer), founder of the 55th Coke's Rifles (Frontier Force)
- John Talbot Coke (1841–1912), British Army officer

== See also ==
- John Cooke (disambiguation) (same pronunciation)
- John Cook (disambiguation) (same pronunciation)
