= James Paull (moderator) =

Church of Scotland clergyman

James Paull (1782–1858) was a minister of the Church of Scotland who served as Moderator of the General Assembly in 1846, the highest position in the Scottish church. From 1852 he was also Chaplain in Ordinary to Queen Victoria in Scotland.

== Life ==
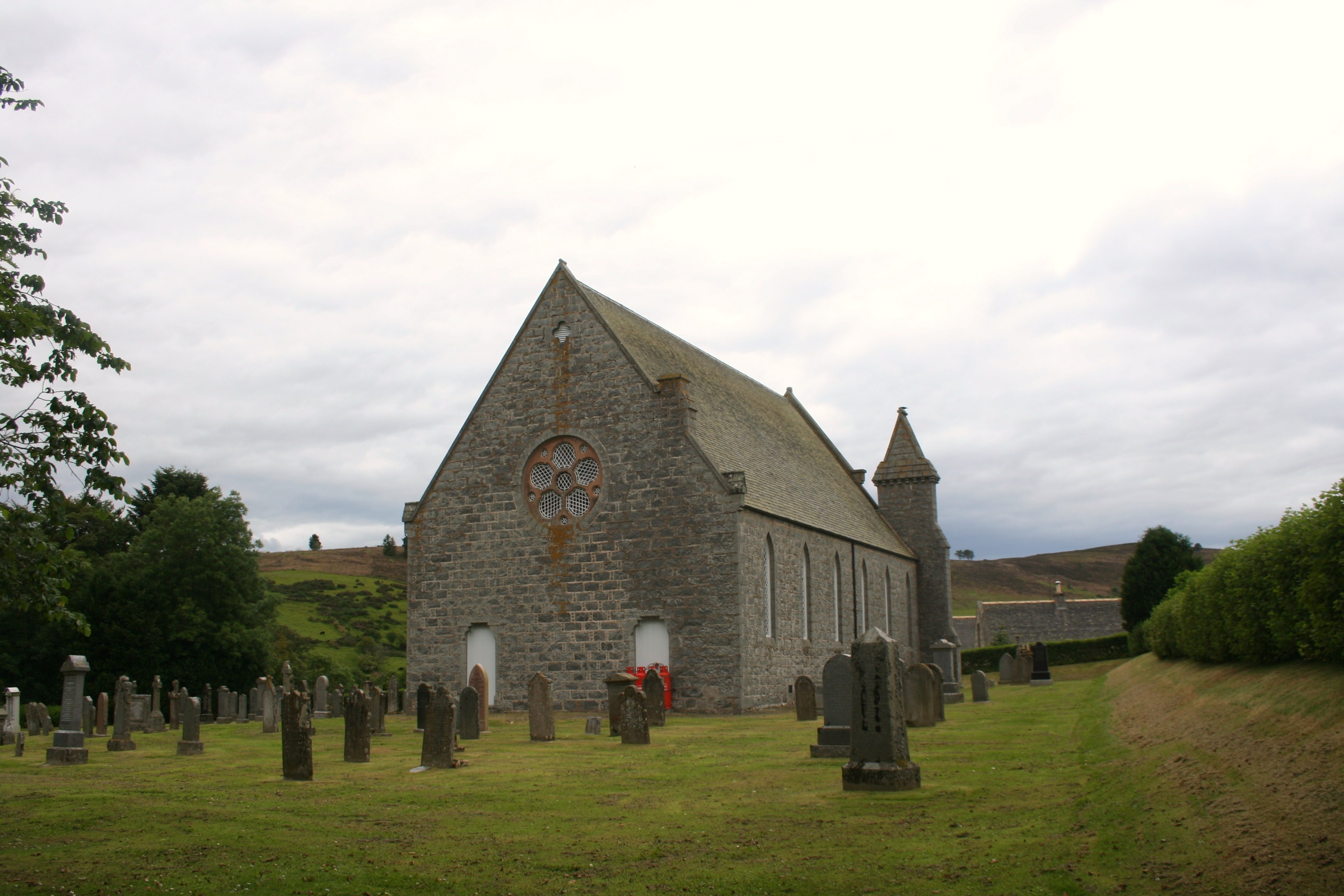
Tullynessle Kirk

He was born in 1782 the son of John Paull, schoolmaster of Drumoak near Aberdeen. He studied at Marischal College in Aberdeen graduating MA in March 1798. He was licensed by the Presbytery of Kincardine O'Neil in April 1804.

In August 1805 he was ordained as minister of College Chapel in Aberdeen. In November 1812, under the patronage of the trustees of James, Earl of Fife he was presented to the congregation of Tullynessle and formally translated to that parish in March 1813. In 1844 Saint Andrews University awarded him an honorary Doctor of Divinity.

In his capacity as an amateur astronomer he corresponded with James Farquharson.

In 1846 he succeeded Alexander Hill as Moderator of the General Assembly of the Church of Scotland the highest position in the Scottish Church. He was succeeded in turn by John Paul.

In 1852 he was chosen as Chaplain in Ordinary to Queen Victoria. He was also Convenor of the Supplementary Orphans Fund in Scotland.

He died in Tullynessle on 21 October 1858.

== Family ==
In March 1822 he married Eliza Lumsden Forbes, daughter of Alexander Forbes of Jamaica. They had several children:

- James Paull (1823–1901) an Aberdeen advocate buried in Nellfield Cemetery
- Eliza Ann Paull (1824–1905)
- Mary Burnett Paull (1826–1876) buried in Nellfield Cemetery
- John Alexander Forbes Paull (1828–1860) died in India
- Jane Paull (b. 1830) married Rev. William Adam Smith of Midmar
- Margaret (b. 1831) died in infancy
- Catherine (1833–1924) married Major Nicholas Gosselin
- Robert (b. 1834) died in infancy
- Rev William Paull (1836–1905) minister of Tullynessle in his father's footsteps
- Barbara Simpson Paul (b. 1840) married Rev George Ross of Hoddam
- Alexander Paull (1842–1915) died in Edinburgh
- Patrick Paull (1844–1883)
- Andrew (b. 1845) died in infancy

== Publications ==
- Account of the Parish of Tullynessle (1845)
