= Thomas Jackson Crawford =

Scottish minister and professor of divinity

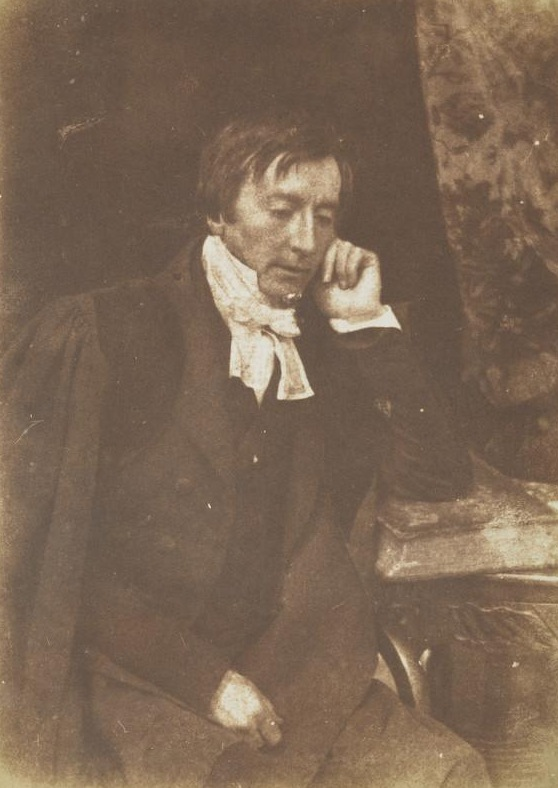
Portrait photograph of Thomas Jackson Crawford by Hill & Adamson, 1840s

Thomas Jackson Crawford FRSE (1812–1875) was a Scottish minister and professor of divinity at the University of Edinburgh. He served as Moderator of the General Assembly of the Church of Scotland in 1867, the highest level within the Scottish church.

He wrote extensively on religious matters and was vocal in his adherence to the established Church of Scotland both during and following the Disruption of 1843.

== Life ==
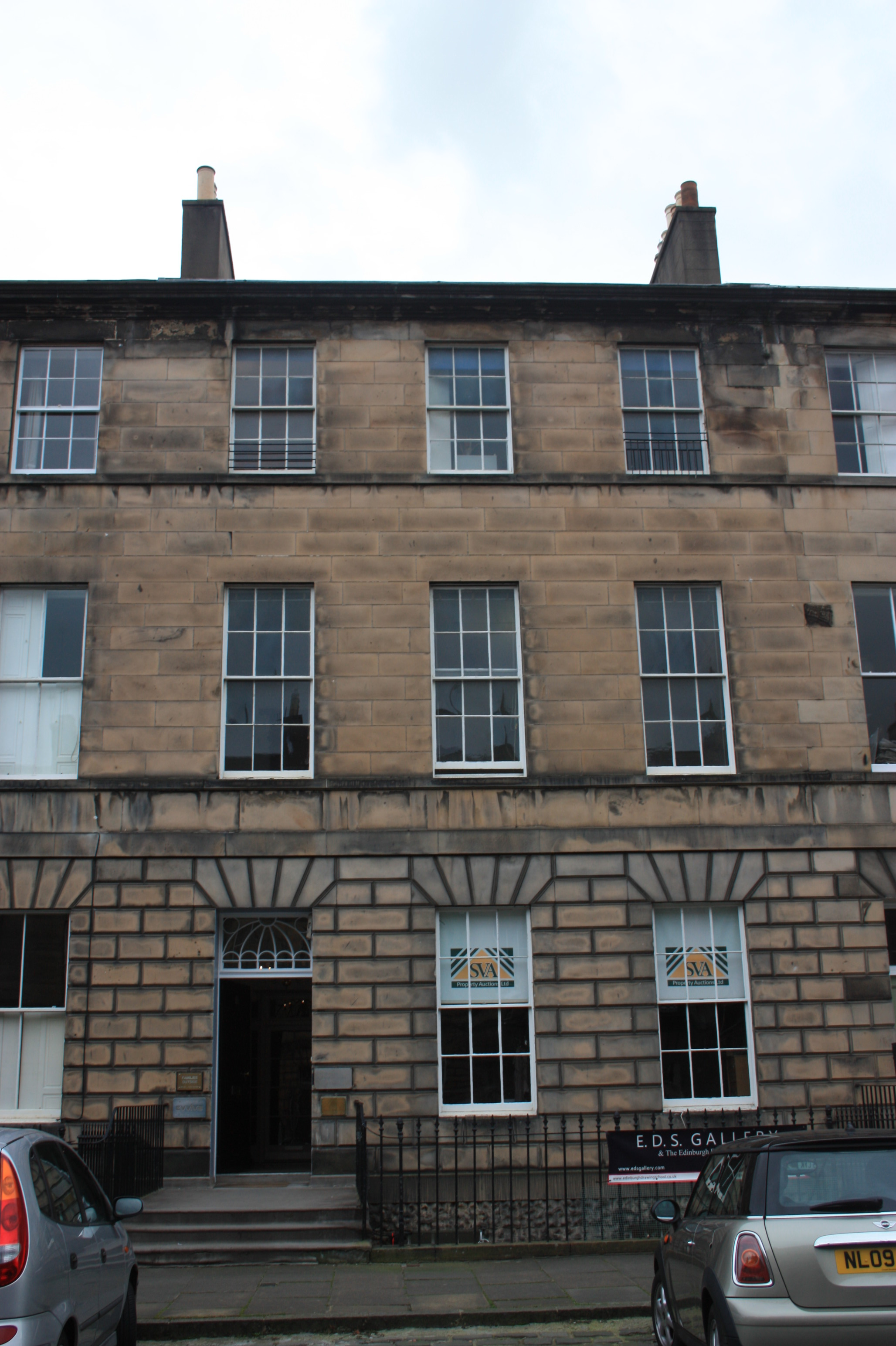
13 Great King Street, Edinburgh

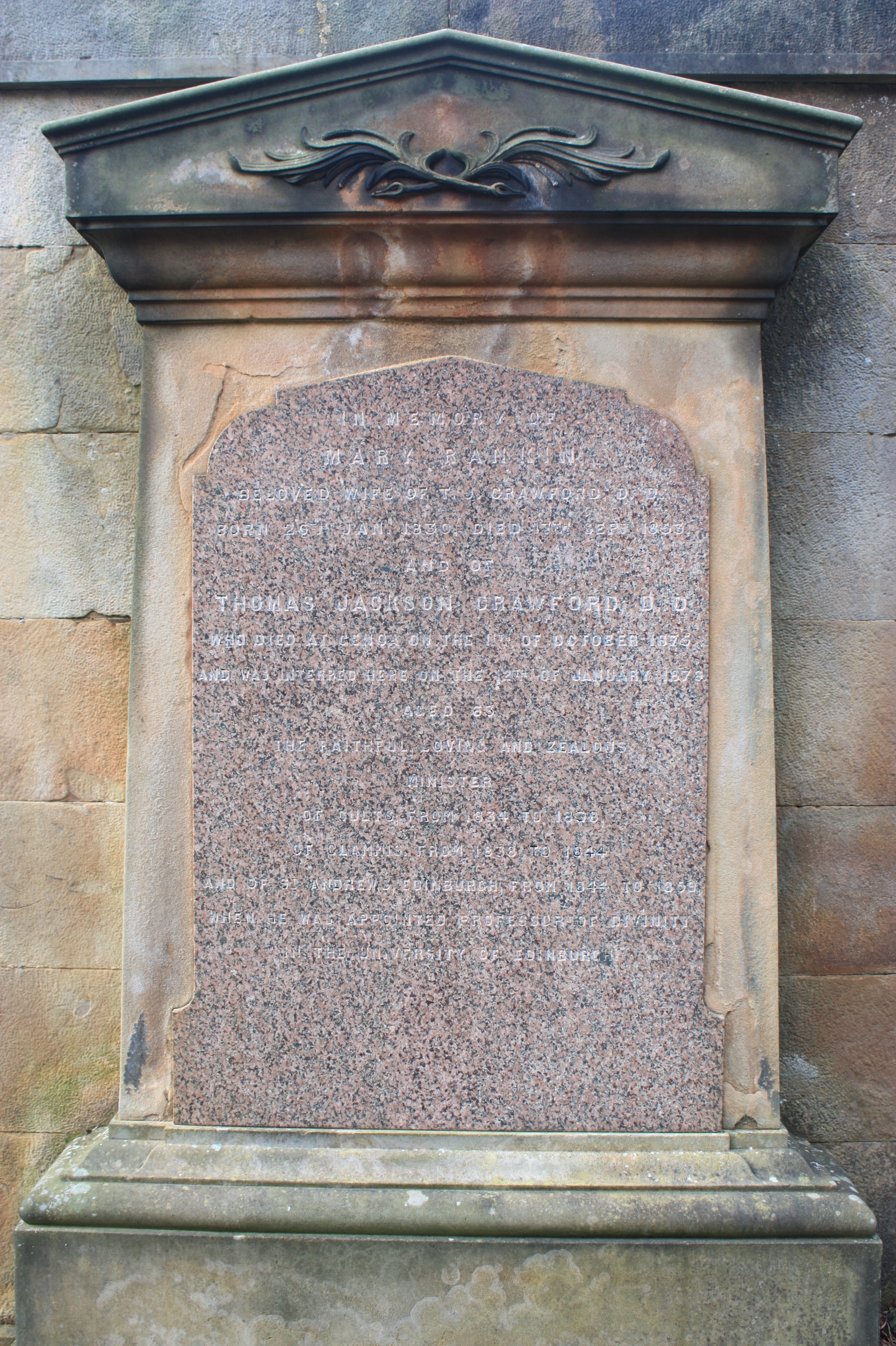
Thomas Jackson Craword's grave, Dean Cemetery

He was born in St Andrews in Fife on 13 February 1812 the son of Agnes McDermeit and the Rev Prof William Crawford DD (died 1822), Professor of Moral Philosophy at United College at the University of St Andrews. Thomas was educated at the High School in Edinburgh and then returned to St Andrews to study divinity at the university, graduating with MA in 1831.

In 1834 he became a minister in Cults, and in 1838, transferred to Glamis to the west. In 1844 he moved to Edinburgh as "second charge" minister of St Andrew's Church on George Street, firstly under Rev Thomas Clark then under Rev John Stuart. During the Disruption of 1843 within the church, he was a strong advocate and campaigner of remaining within the established Church of Scotland. In 1859, over and above his ministering duties, he was made professor of divinity at the University of Edinburgh and continued in this role until 1875. At this time he was living at 13 Great King Street, a large Georgian townhouse in Edinburgh's Second New Town.

In 1861 he was made Chaplain in Ordinary to Queen Victoria.

In 1867 his eminence led to him being elected Moderator of the General Assembly of the Church of Scotland, succeeding Very Rev John Cook. He was elected a Fellow of the Royal Society of Edinburgh in 1871, his proposer being John Hutton Balfour.

He died in Genoa in Italy on 11 October 1875.

His body was returned to Edinburgh, where he was buried in Dean Cemetery on 12 January 1876 next to his wife, Mary Rankin (1830–1853) who had died young. The grave lies on the north wall of the original cemetery.

== Publications ==
- Reasons of Adherence to the Church of Scotland (1843)
- An Argument for Jewish Missionaries (1847)
- Presbyterianism Defended Against the Exclusive Claims of Prelacy (1853)
- Presbytery or Prelacy (1867)
- The Fatherhood of God (1867)
- The Doctrine of Holy Scripture, Respecting the Atonement (1871)
- The Mysteries of Christianity (1874)

== Family ==
He married twice: firstly to Mary Rankine (1830–1853) daughter of Robert Rankine, a Liverpool merchant, who died aged only 23; secondly to Elizabeth Robertson, daughter of William Robertson of Malta. He had two sons by the second marriage: William Thomas Crawford MD (d. 1925) and George William Crawford.

== Artistic recognition ==
His marble bust, by William Brodie, is within the University of Edinburgh Art Collection. An early photographic negative (1843) by Hill & Adamson is held by the Scottish National Portrait Gallery.
