= Newburn, Fife =

Civil parish in Fife, Scotland

Coordinates: 56.224°N 2.898°W

Newburn is a civil parish in the County of Fife in Scotland. It is located on the north coast of the Firth of Forth and bounded by the parishes of Kilconquhar and Largo. It was originally a rural parish with no major settlement, but with the development of Leven as a seaside resort in the late 19th century, the population of the parish grew considerably.

According to an 1857 description, "The parish is bounded on the north & east by Kilconquhar, on the south by Largo Bay and on the west by Largo. It is 3.5 miles (5.6 km) from north to south and 2 miles (3.2 km) in breadth. Its area is 2,400 acres (9.7 km^{2}), all under cultivation except 350 under pasture and 130 under wood. The land surface near the shore is sandy, forming extensive links which are kept in pasture. The land ascends from the shore to the northwards, reaching its greatest height at Gilston. The soil, with the exception of the links, is very fertile. The rent of land averages £2-12-0 per acre. The parish schoolmaster's salary is £30, plus £14 of fees, besides which there is an allowance for teaching a certain number of Poor children, from a fund left by John Wood of Orkie in 1659. There is 1 public house in the parish; sobriety and industry prevail. The nearest market towns are Colinsburgh and Largo. Balchristie is the only hamlet in the parish, containing a few houses".

== Etymology ==
The name Newburn was first recorded in 1150 as Nithbren and may be of Pictish origin. The second element may be either *bren meaning "hill, hill-side" (cf. Welsh bryn), or *pren meaning "tree" (Welsh pren). The first part, *nith, could be a Pictish ethnonym.

Early documents refer to it as "Newburn of Old Drumeldrie" an ancient parish north of Largo in the control of Dunfermline Abbey. There is no strong reason to think the settlement is of Pictish origin and the village name seems simply English: New Burn (the stream is artificially straightened); New Barn; or New Berm.

== Newburn Churchyard ==
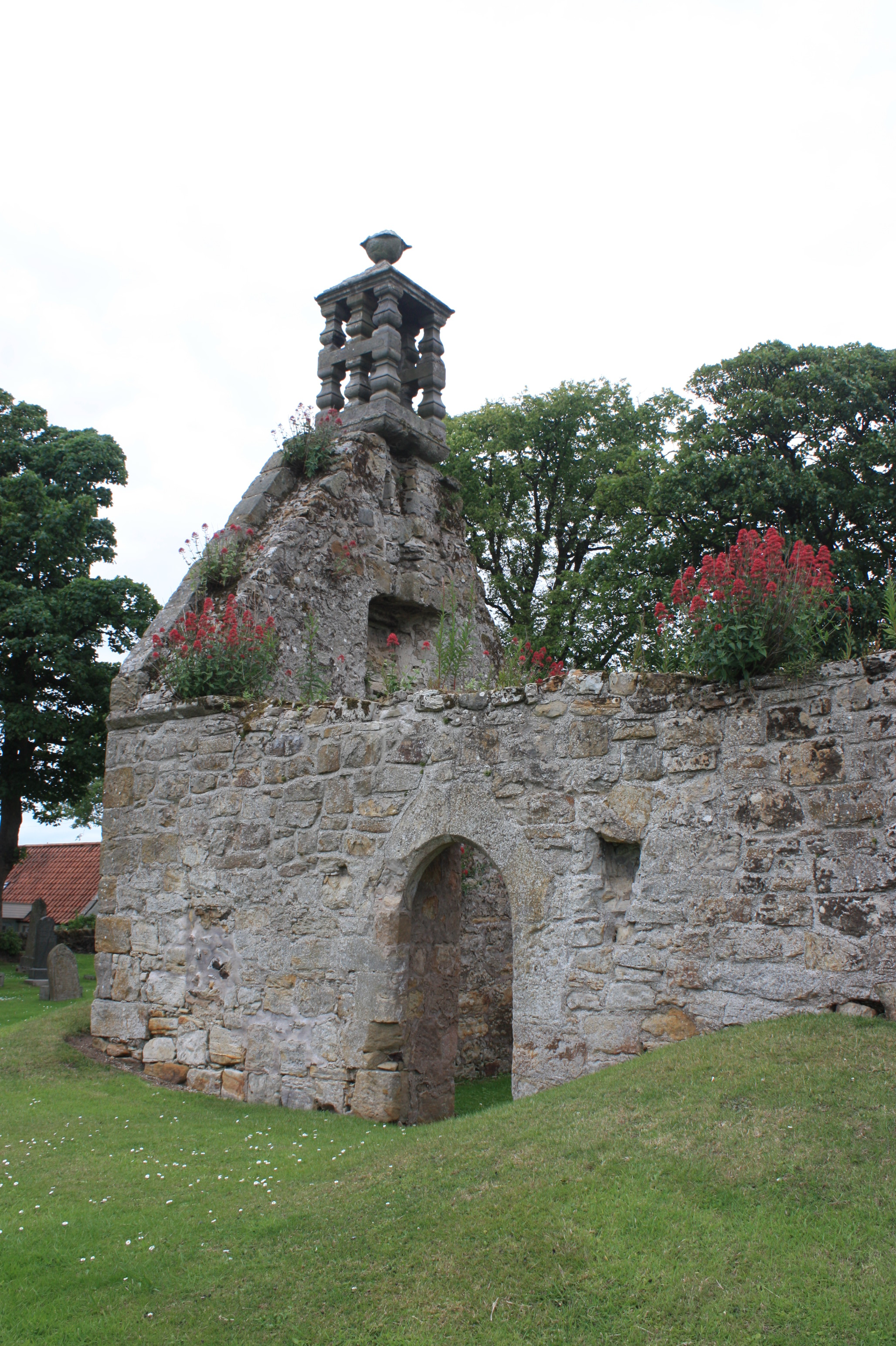
Newburn church, Fife

The church was dedicated to St. Serf in 1564. Its ministers were: Thomas Jamieson (1564-1566); George Lundie (1568-1574); Andrew Hunter (1588-1592); David Mearns (1588–89); John Carmichael (1595-1603); John Dykes (1604-1610); Ephraim Melvill (1611-1617); John Foreet (1619-1628); George Hamilton (1628-1650); James Fleming (1650-1651); Robert Honyman (1653-1657); George Hamilton (1659-1662); John Auchenleck (1663-1665); William Ogilvie (1666-1679); William Syme (1679-1681); Andrew Youngson (1682-1685); James Hay of Naughton (1685-1690); George Hamilton (1692-1696); George Cleland (1696-1700); Arthur Fairfoul (1700-1704); David Myles (1705-1734); James Smith (1734-1768); John Richardson (1769-1778); Archibald Bonar (1779-1783); James Brown (1783-1786); James Mitchell (1787-1793); Thomas Laurie DD (1793-1843); Alexander Urquhart (1843-1885); George Geekie (1883-1913); William Neil (1914-?).

The tiny and long-abandoned church acts as a magnet to burials of note. These include:

- Sir Raymond Patrick Hadow
- Prof James Lorimer (advocate)
- Sir Robert Lorimer architect
- John Henry Lorimer artist
- Leonora Jeffrey Rintoul ornithologist, a rare female Fellow of the Royal Society of Edinburgh

== Notable residents ==
- Rev George Hamilton (1635-1712) Moderator of the General Assembly in 1699
- Mr Andrew Hunter, (d. 1638) Minister of Newburn and chaplain to Francis Stewart, 5th Earl of Bothwell
- Rev Prof John Cook FRSE (1739–1815) Professor of Moral Philosophy at St Andrews University, co-founder of the Royal Society of Edinburgh in 1783
- Rev Prof George Cook FRSE (1772–1845), son of the above, Professor of Moral Philosophy at St Andrews University (following in his father's footsteps), Moderator of the General Assembly of the Church of Scotland in 1825.
