= George Hamilton (1699 moderator) =

Church of Scotland minister and 1699 moderator

George Hamilton of Cairns (1635–1712) was a Church of Scotland minister who served as Moderator of the General Assembly in 1699.

== Life ==
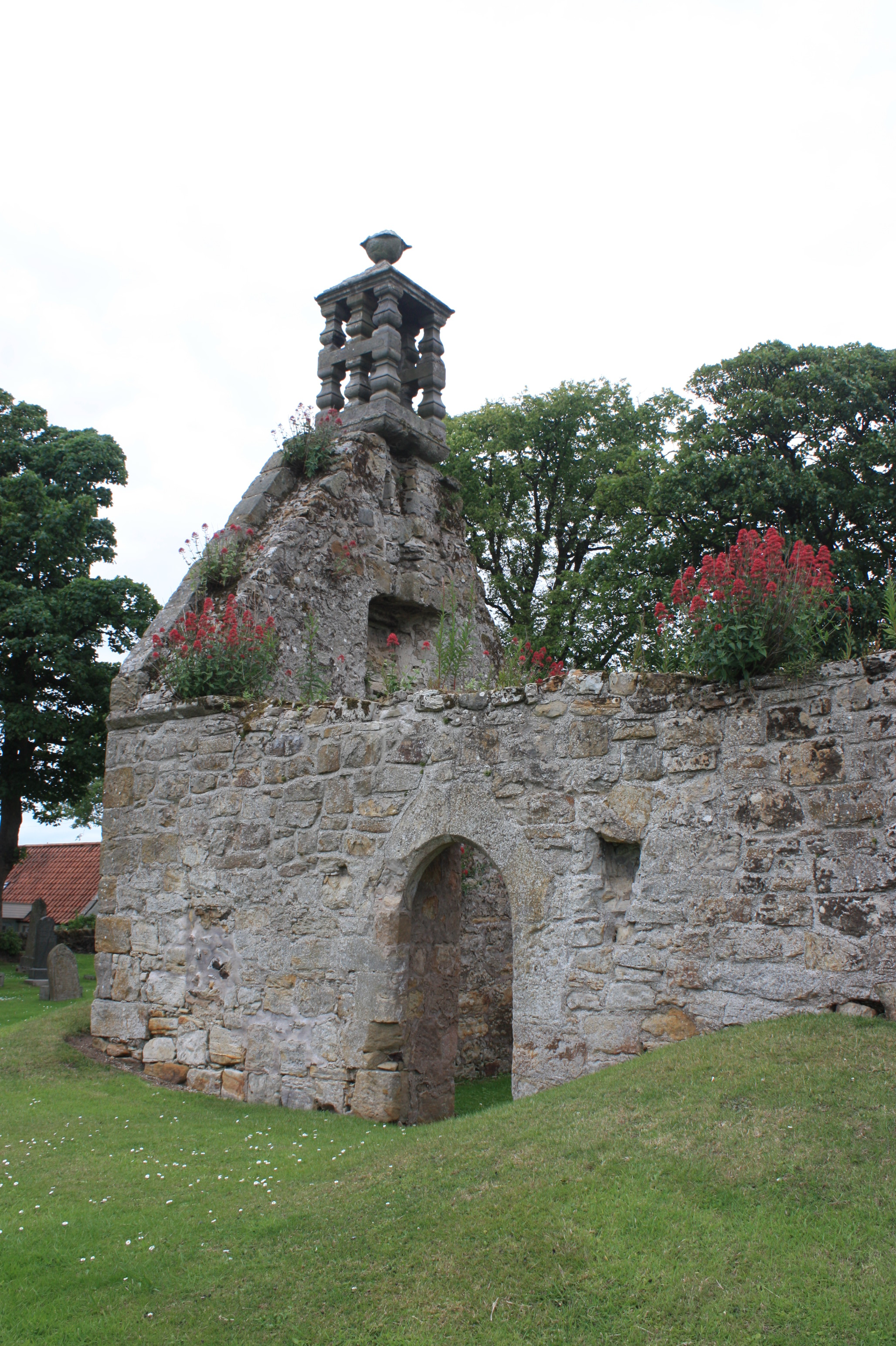
Ruin of Newburn church, Fife

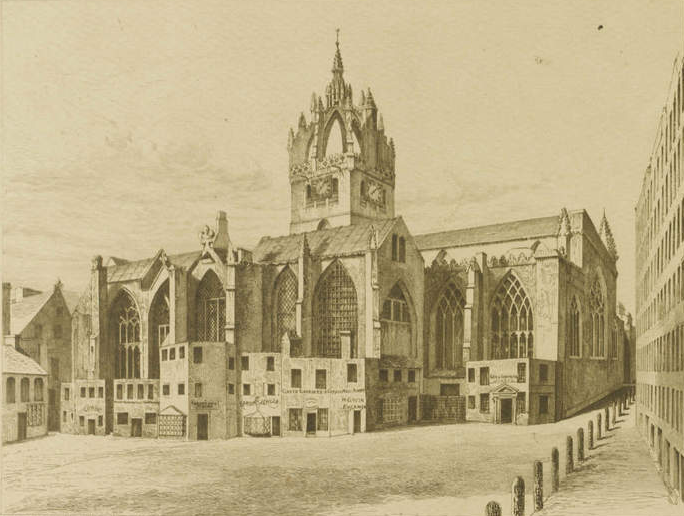
St Giles' in the 17th century (from Parliament Square)

He was born in the manse at Pittenweem in 1635 the eldest son of Rev. George Hamilton (d. 1673), the local minister. His father apparently translated to Newburn, Fife in 1636 and in 1637 appears with Alexander Henderson of Leuchars and James Bruce of Kingsbarns as three Fife ministers petitioning regarding the changes in the Book of Common Prayer.

He studied at St Andrews University from 1649 graduating MA in 1653. In 1659 he was he ordained as a minister of the Church of Scotland, his first charge being Newburn in south Fife close to his birthplace.

In the troubled times of the 1660s he was deprived of office in 1662 due to the Stuart Restoration. He then disappears from public record for around 30 years, and probably survived through teaching as a private tutor in Fife. Following the Glorious Revolution in Scotland he was reallowed to preach in 1690 but his role at Newburn did not become open until 1692. In February 1696 he translated to be minister of St Leonard's Parish in St Andrews and also then became Principal of St Leonard's College there.

In 1697 he translated to be minister of the High Church (St Giles) in Edinburgh. In January 1699 he was elected Moderator of the General Assembly of the Church of Scotland, in place of Rev. George Meldrum.

He ceased preaching in January 1710 and appears to have stood unsuccessfully as a candidate as MP for Pittenweem against Sir John Anstruther.

He died on 26 May 1712.

== Family ==
He firstly married Margaret Boyd, daughter of John Boyd of Trochrig. They had two daughters: Margaret Hamilton who married Rev. Robert Clelland of Kilrenny (near Pittenweem) and Sophia Hamilton who married Thomas Spence, an Edinburgh lawyer.

He secondly married Elizabeth Hay (d. 1708), sister of Dr. John Hay of Cousland.
