= Robert Lorimer (minister) =

Scottish minister

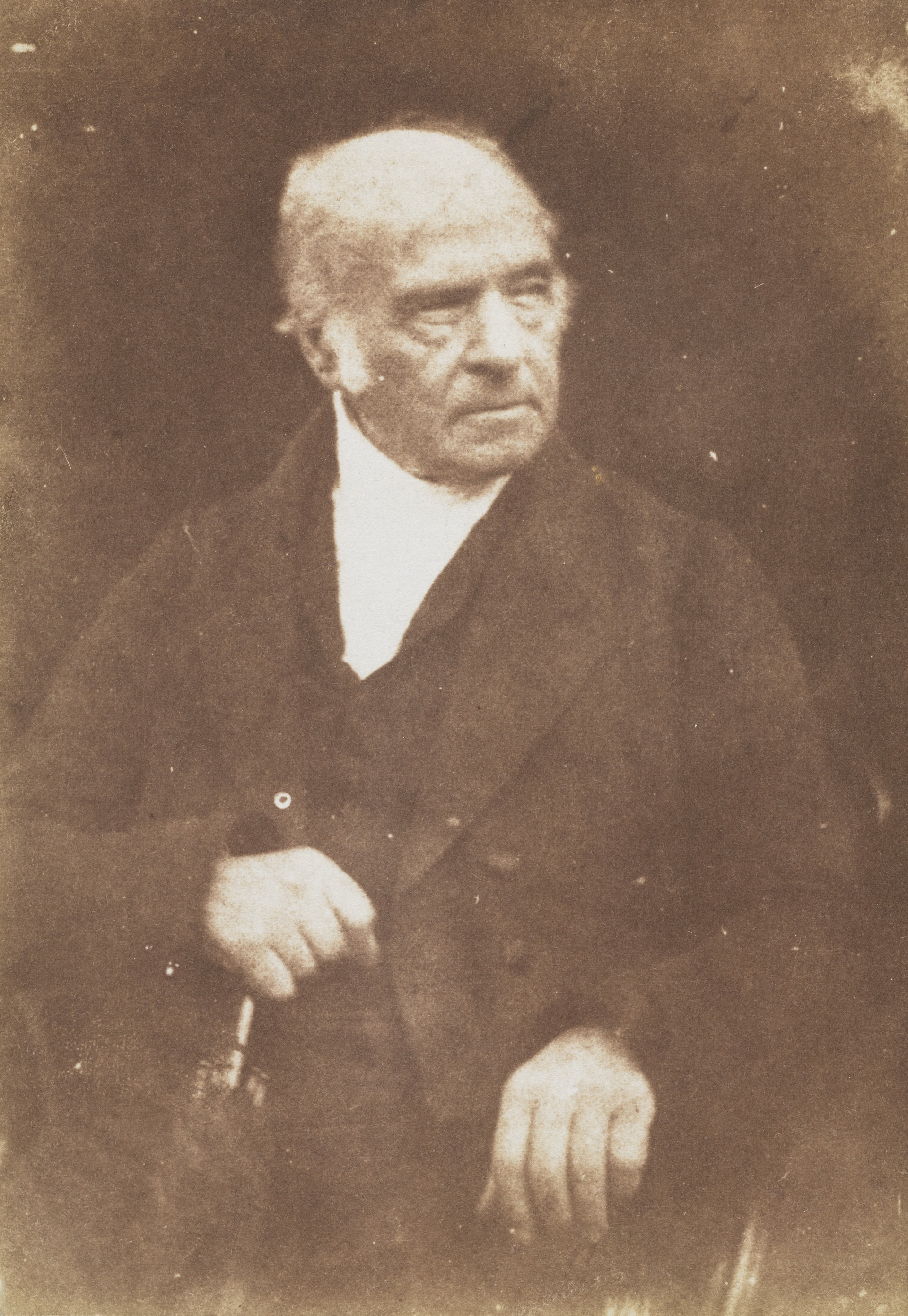
- Robert Lorimer by Hill & Adamson
- Church: Paisley

Personal details
- Born: 11 May 1765
- Died: 9 November 1848 (aged 83)

minister of Haddington (first charge)
- In office 16 June 1796 – 18 May 1843

colleague minister of St John's Free Church, Haddington
- In office 18 May 1843 – 9 November 1848

Robert Lorimer was a Presbyterian minister who served in Haddington. After nearly 50 years in the Church of Scotland ministry he walked out during the schism known as The Disruption and joined the Free Church of Scotland.

== Life ==
Robert Lorimer was born on 11 May 1765, the son of Robert Lorimer, Kirkconnell. He was educated at University of Glasgow. After graduation he became tutor in the family of Grant of Rothiemurchus. He was licensed by the Church of Scotland Presbytery of Abernethy in September 1791. He was subsequently ordained by the Presbytery of Penpont, on 3 July 1793. He served as chaplain to the Southern Regiment of Fencibles. He was award a doctorate LL.D. from the University of Glasgow in 1795. He was presented to Haddington by James, Earl of Hopetoun, and admitted on 16 June 1796. At the Disruption he joined the Free Church and worked as a colleague minister of St John's Free Church, Haddington, from 1843. After 50 years in the ministry he was invited to a public dinner which was presided over by Angus Makellar. He died on 9 November 1848.

== Family ==
He married 6 July 1801, Elizabeth (died 19 September 1843), daughter of John Gordon of Balmoor, W.S., and had issue—

- Robert, surgeon, Haddington, born 21 May 1802, died 9 November 1848
- John Gordon, minister of St David's Parish, and afterwards of St David's Free Church, Glasgow
- Margaret Stewart, born 27 June 1803, died 19 April 1827
- Jane, born 4 May 1806, died 31 March 1823
- Alexander Patrick, born 3 October 1807
- James, born 16 April 1810, died 11 September 1829.

== Publications ==
Lorimer, with John Cook, wrote the New Statistical Account for the parish of Haddington. Lorimer was an Evangelical and Cook was a Moderate.

- Two single Sermons (Edinburgh, 1813–29)
- Character of the Rev. Thomas Davidson of Muirhouse, D.D. (Muirhead's Sermons)
- Sermon: The Reign of Christ, the Joy of the World
- Sermon: The Psalmist's intense love for the ordinances of public worship
- Sermon: Reasons for Rejoicing in the Lord's Day
- Sermon: The Observance of the Christian Sabbath

== Photographic representation ==
Lorimer was photographed by Hill & Adamson for the Disruption painting. Lorimer was born a few years after Conrad Heyer but nevertheless was one of the earliest-born people ever photographed. In the final painting Lorimer is depicted immediately to the viewer's right of David Brewster (who is reading a book with his hand on his glasses) and not far to the viewer's left of Thomas Chalmers in the very centre above Patrick MacFarlan who is signing the deed of demission. Lorimer, above a pile of books, is two to the viewer's left of David Welsh who is holding a copy of the protest.

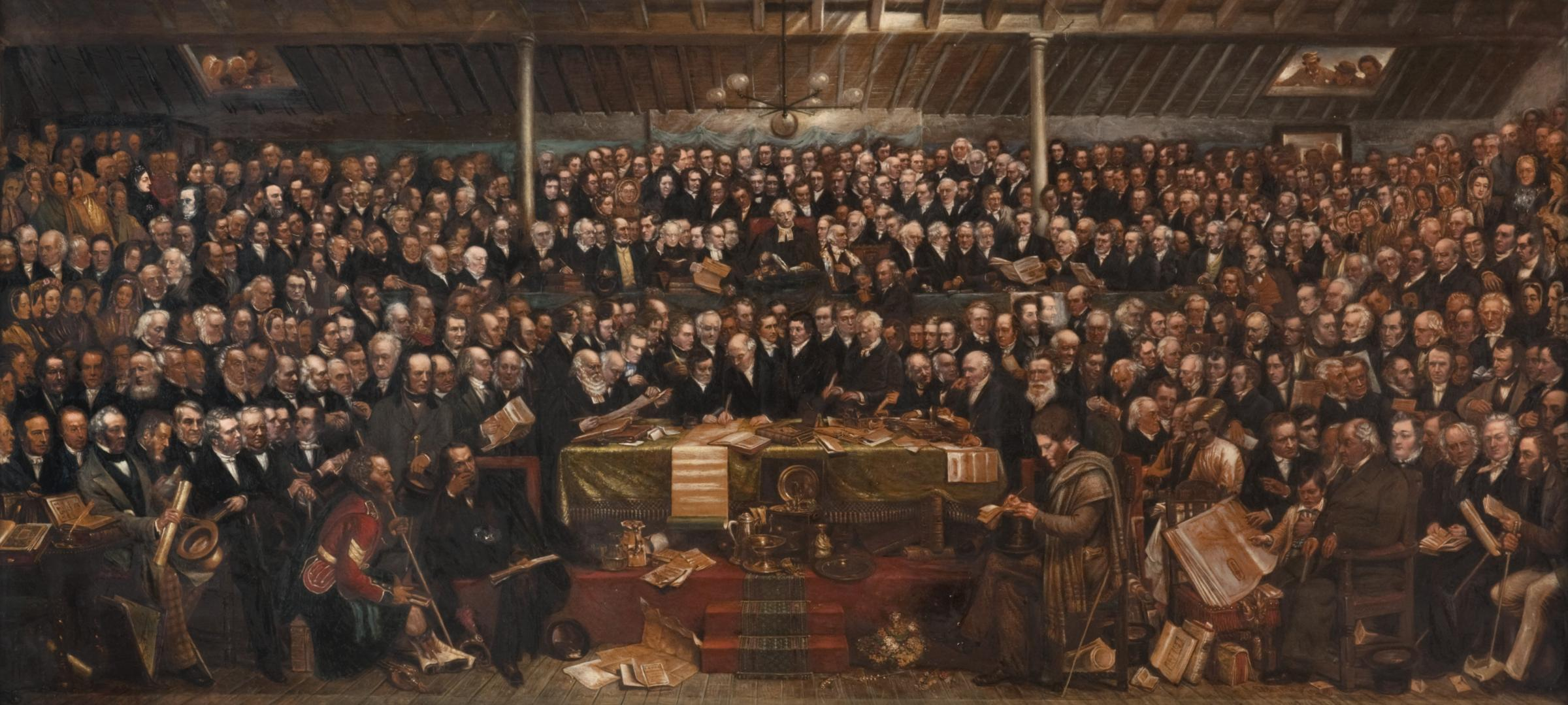
The Disruption Assembly by David Octavius Hill
