= James Sellar (minister) =

Scottish politician and religious leader

James Sellar (1812–1886) was a Scottish minister who served as Moderator of the General Assembly of the Church of Scotland in 1875.

== Life ==
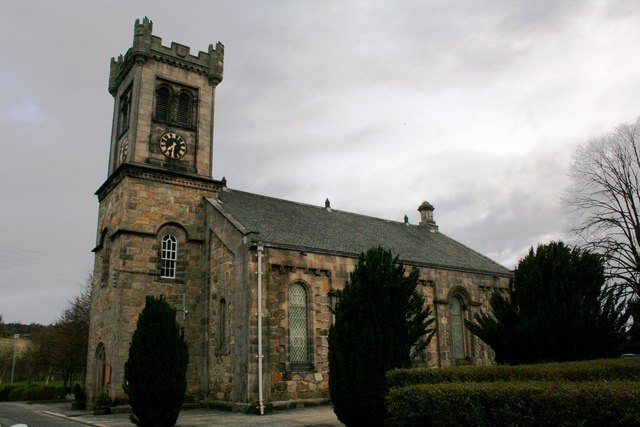
Aberlour Church

He was born in Keith on 20 February 1812 the son of Thomas Sellar a shoemaker, and his wife, Rachel Robertson. He was educated at Keith Academy then studied at King's College, Aberdeen graduating MA in 1837 then doing further studies in divinity at St Andrews University. From 1838 to 1843 he was a schoolmaster at St Andrews Lhanbryde, being licensed to preach as a Church of Scotland minister by the Presbytery of Elgin in September 1842.

In July 1843 he was ordained as a minister of Aberlour. In 1858 King's College awarded him an honorary Doctor of Divinity.

In 1867 he served on the Committee on Aids to Devotion.

In 1875 he succeeded Rev Prof Samuel Trail as Moderator of the General Assembly, the highest position in the Church of Scotland. He was succeeded in turn by Rev George Cook. In the year of his being Moderator he served under the Earl of Rosslyn as Lord High Commissioner of the General Assembly, and with Robert Lee, advocate as Procurator.

He died in Aberlour on 10 August 1886.

== Publications ==
- Church Doctrine and Practice (1869)
- The Conflicts: Progress and Final Triumph of God's Work in the World (1876)

== Artistic recognition ==
He was painted by George Paul Chalmers around 1875.
