= Thomas Guthrie Wright =

Scottish lawyer and antiquarian

Thomas Guthrie Wright WS FRSE FSA(Scot) (1777–1849) was a Scottish lawyer and antiquarian.

== Life ==
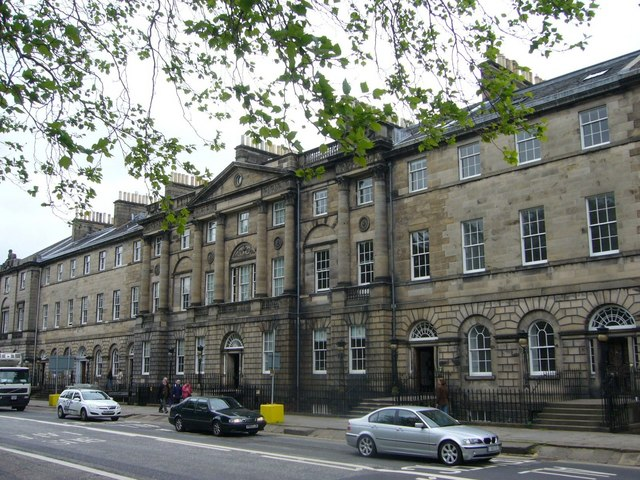
Charlotte Square

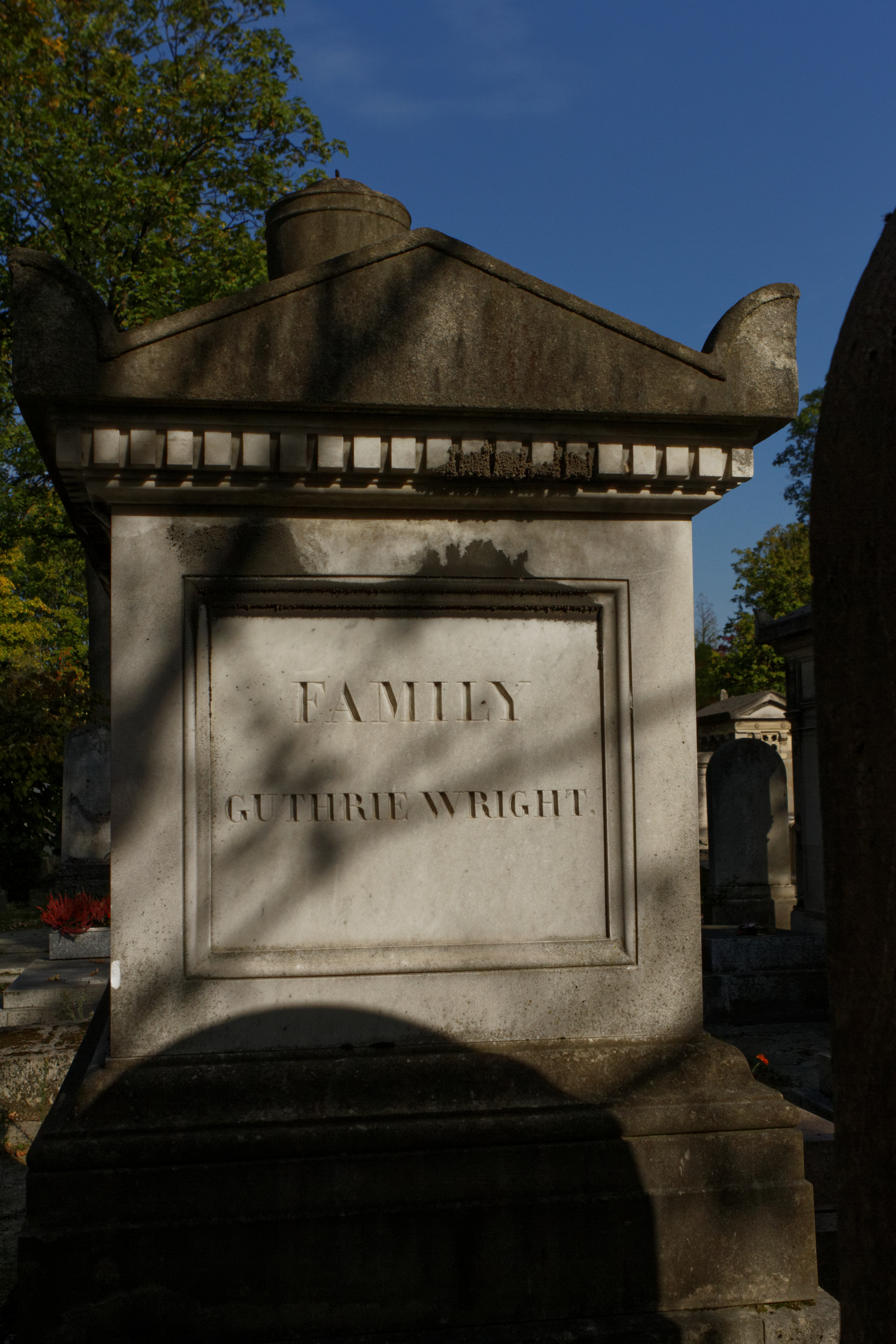
Père-Lachaise the Guthrie-Wright tomb

He was born in Edinburgh in 1777 the son of Charles Wright a stationer and bookseller living and trading from Parliament Square on the Royal Mile.

He trained as a lawyer in at Edinburgh and qualified as a Writer to the Signet in 1802. From 1806 until death he was Auditor to the Court of Session in the Edinburgh courts.

In 1820 he was elected a Fellow of the Royal Society of Edinburgh. His proposers were Sir David Brewster, Thomas Allan and Joshua Henry Davidson . At this time he was living at 2 Charlotte Square, a magnificent townhouse by Robert Adam.

In 1830 he was living at 6 St Colme Street on the fashionable Moray Estate in Edinburgh's West End.

He died in Paris on 1 September 1849 and is buried in the prestigious Pere La Chaise Cemetery in the north-east of the city.

== Family ==
In March 1809 he married Mary Hill (d.1857) daughter of John Hill.
