= John Cooke (bookseller) =

English bookseller

- Born: 1731
- Died: 25 March 1810 (aged 78–79)
- Occupation: Bookseller

John Cooke (1731 – 25 March 1810) was an English bookseller.

== Biography ==
Cooke was born in 1731, and began life as assistant to Alexander Hogg, one of the earliest publishers of the cheap "Paternoster Row numbers," or standard popular works issued in weekly parts. Cooke started for himself, and made a large fortune in the same way of business. Southwell's (or rather Sanders's) "Bible with Notes" is said to have brought him 30,000l. (Gent. Mag. lxxx. pt. i. 386). The sum appears to be scarcely credible. Leigh Hunt tells us: "In those days Cooke's edition of the British poets came up. .. How I loved these little sixpenny numbers, containing whole poets! I doted on their size; I doted on their type, on their ornaments, on their wrapper, containing lists of other poets, and on the engravings from Kirk" (Autobiography, 1860, p. 76). These editions were published in sixpenny whity-brown-covered weekly parts, fairly well edited and printed. They were divided into three sections—select novels, sacred classics, and select poets. A shilling "superior edition" was also issued. Cooke died at York Place, Kingsland Road, on 25 March 1810, aged 79. His son Charles succeeded to the business at the Shakspeare's Head, Paternoster Row, but only survived him six years, dying 16 April 1816, aged 56. The son was a liveryman of the Stationers' Company.
