= John Cooke (Oxford University cricketer) =

English cricketer

John Cooke (c. 1808 – 29 January 1841) was an English cricketer from Bristol who was associated with Oxford University Cricket Club and made his debut in 1829.

== Bibliography ==
- Haygarth, Arthur (1996) [1862]. Scores & Biographies, Volume 1 (1744–1826). Kennington: Frederick Lillywhite. ISBN 978-19-00592-23-9.
- Haygarth, Arthur (1997) [1862]. Scores & Biographies, Volume 2 (1827–1840). Kennington: Frederick Lillywhite. ISBN 978-19-00592-23-9.
