= John Cook (moderator 1816) =

Scottish minister, historian and amateur artist

Personal details
- Born: John Cook; 24 November 1771
- Died: 28 November 1824 (aged 53)

minister of Kilmany
- In office 9 May 1793 – 5 May 1802

professor of Hebrew at St Andrews
- In office 5 May 1802 – 27 September 1808

professor of Biblical Criticism at St Andrews
- In office 27 September 1808 – 28 November 1824

Moderator of the General Assembly of the Church of Scotland
- In office 16 May 1816 – May 1817

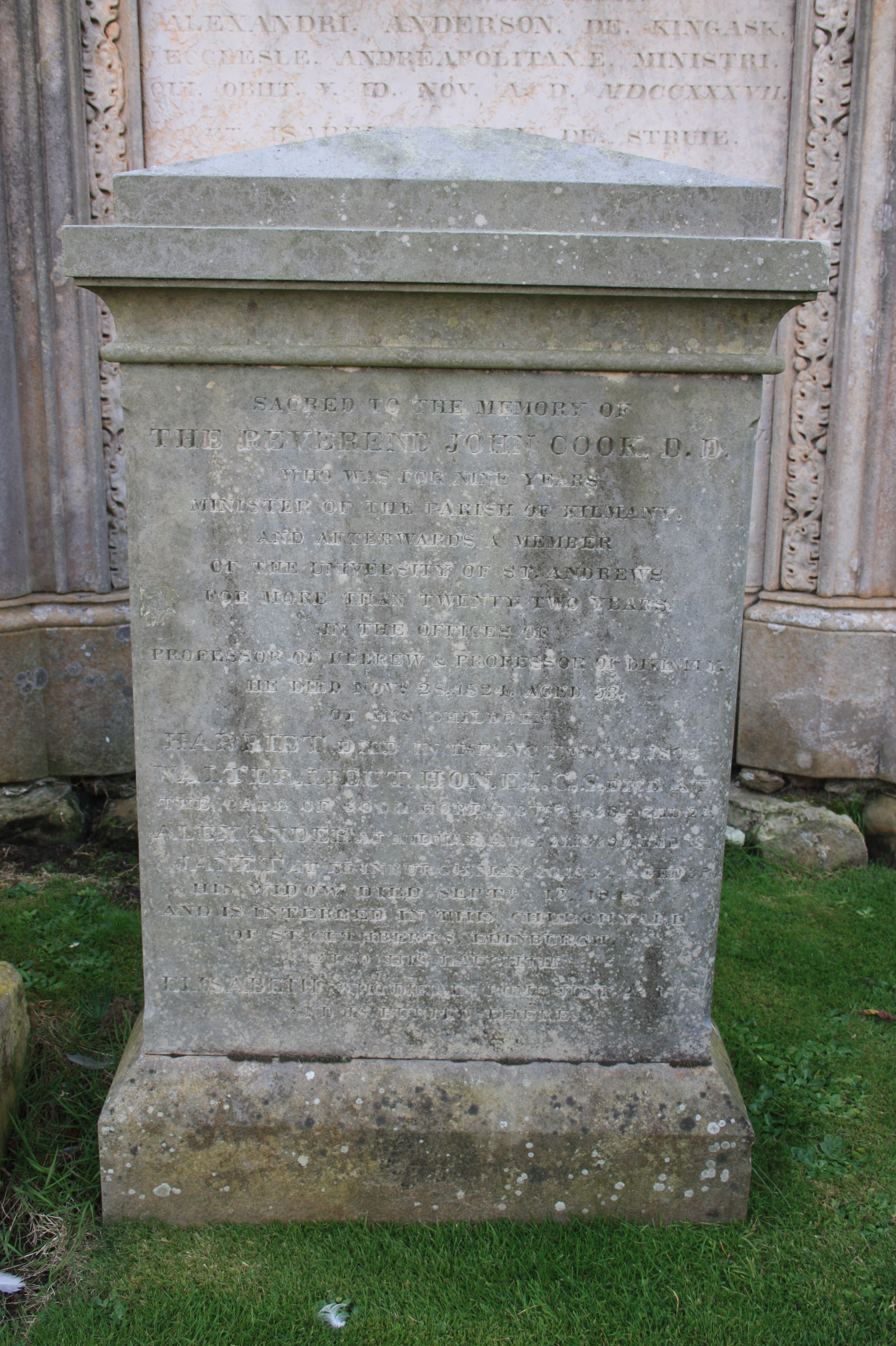
The grave of Very Rev John Cook, St Andrews Cathedral Churchyard

John Cook (24 November 1771–28 November 1824) was a Scottish minister, historian and amateur artist. He was a pioneer in the field of Biblical Criticism.

== Life ==
He was born on 24 November 1771 in St Andrews, the first son of John Cook and his wife, Janet Hill, sister of George Hill. He was the first of 12 children. His birthdate is sometimes shown in records as 1771 to disguise his birth being less than 9 months after his parents' marriage.

He studied Divinity at St Andrews University under his father and was licensed to preach by the Church of Scotland. In 1793 he became minister of Kilmany.

A technically skilled album of his drawings (mainly townscapes in St Andrews) from 1797 is in the possession of the University of St Andrews. In 1802 he was appointed Professor of Hebrew at St Andrews University. He was later given the first university Chair in Biblical Criticism (1808-1824).

He died in St Andrews on 28 November 1824 aged 54.

== Family ==
He married his cousin, Elisabeth Hill, daughter of George Hill. They had at least seven children. He was father to John Cook (1807-1869) who in turn was father to Rachel Cook.

His brother was George Cook.

He married 2 July 1803, Elizabeth (died 12 September 1848), daughter of George Hill, D.D., Principal of St Mary's College, and had issue —

- Harriet, died 1805
- Alexander, born 1804, died 1839
- Janet, born 11 January 1806, died 20 May 1842
- John, D.D., professor of Church History, St Andrews, born 1 September 1807
- George, minister of Kincardine O'Neil, born 27 March 1809
- Elizabeth, born 15 August 1812, died at Rome 1878
- Walter, lieut. Madras Infantry, born 19 January 1815, died 1838
- Alexander, born 1 May 1821.

== Publications ==
- An Inquiry into the Books of the New Testament (Edinburgh, 1821)
- An Album of Watercolours of St Andrews (1797)
