= John Cook (rugby league) =

Australian rugby league footballer (born 1941)

Personal information
- Full name: John Thomas Cook
- Born: 5 June 1941 (age 85) Newcastle, New South Wales, Australia

Playing information
- Position: Prop
Club
Years	Team	Pld	T	G	FG	P
1974–78	Lakes United	102	4	0	0	12
1979	Newtown Jets	0	0	0	0	0
1980–81	South Sydney	2	0	0	0	0
	Total	104	4	0	0	12
Representative
Years	Team	Pld	T	G	FG	P
1975	Newcastle	1	0	0	0	0

John Thomas Cook (born 5 June 1941) is an Australian former professional rugby league footballer from Newcastle, New South Wales.

== Early career ==
Cook played soccer in his early life and represented New South Wales at under 16 level winning the national championship in 1956. He also won a national championship in Junior Surf Boats for Swansea Caves Beach Surf Life Saving club.

== Rugby league ==
Cook started his first grade career at the Lakes United in Newcastle and also represented Newcastle in the 1975 Amco Cup playing one game. He remained there for two seasons and then joined Newtown Jets in 1979. Unable to break into first grade, he moved to South Sydney Rabbitohs for two seasons between 1980, playing one Tooth Cup, one pre-season trial and eight reserve grade games and 1981, playing two first grade games and fourteen reserve grade games. He retired at 39 after the 1981 season.
