= John Cooke (footballer, born 1878) =

English footballer (1878–1909)

Personal information
- Full name: John Alfred Cooke
- Date of birth: 1878
- Place of birth: Mansfield, England
- Date of death: 10 August 1909 (aged 30)
- Place of death: Sutton-in-Ashfield, England
- Position: Outside left

Senior career*
Years	Team	Apps	(Gls)
1897–1898	Mansfield Wesleyans		
1898–1900	Derby County	11	(2)
Total		11	(2)
- * Club domestic league appearances and goals

John Alfred Cooke (1878 – 10 August 1909) was an English footballer who played in the Football League for Derby County as an outside left.

Cooke made 11 appearances in the Football League First Division for Derby County, scoring twice. His debut was on 20 April 1899, at home to Nottingham Forest, and the remaining 10 matches came in the first half of the 1899–1900 season.

Cooke drowned on 10 August 1909 while swimming in a deep mill dam at Sutton-in-Ashfield, Nottinghamshire.
