= John Cook (soldier, born 1847) =

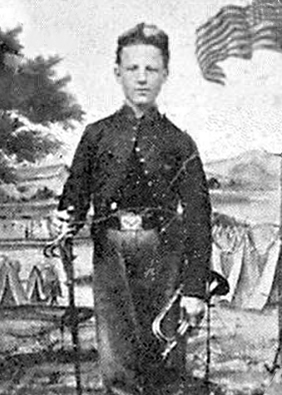
- Union Army bugler John Cook
- Born: August 10, 1847; Cincinnati, Ohio
- Died: August 3, 1915 (age 67); Washington, D.C.
- Burial place: Arlington National Cemetery, Arlington County, Virginia
- Military career
- Allegiance: United States of America; Union
- Branch: United States Army; Union Army
- Rank: Bugler
- Unit: Battery Battery B, 4th Regiment U.S. Artillery
- Conflicts: American Civil War • Battle of Antietam • Battle of Gettysburg
- Awards: Medal of Honor

John Cook (August 10, 1847 – August 3, 1915) was a bugler in the Union Army during the American Civil War. At age 15, he earned the United States military's highest decoration, the Medal of Honor, for his actions at the Battle of Antietam.

== Biography ==
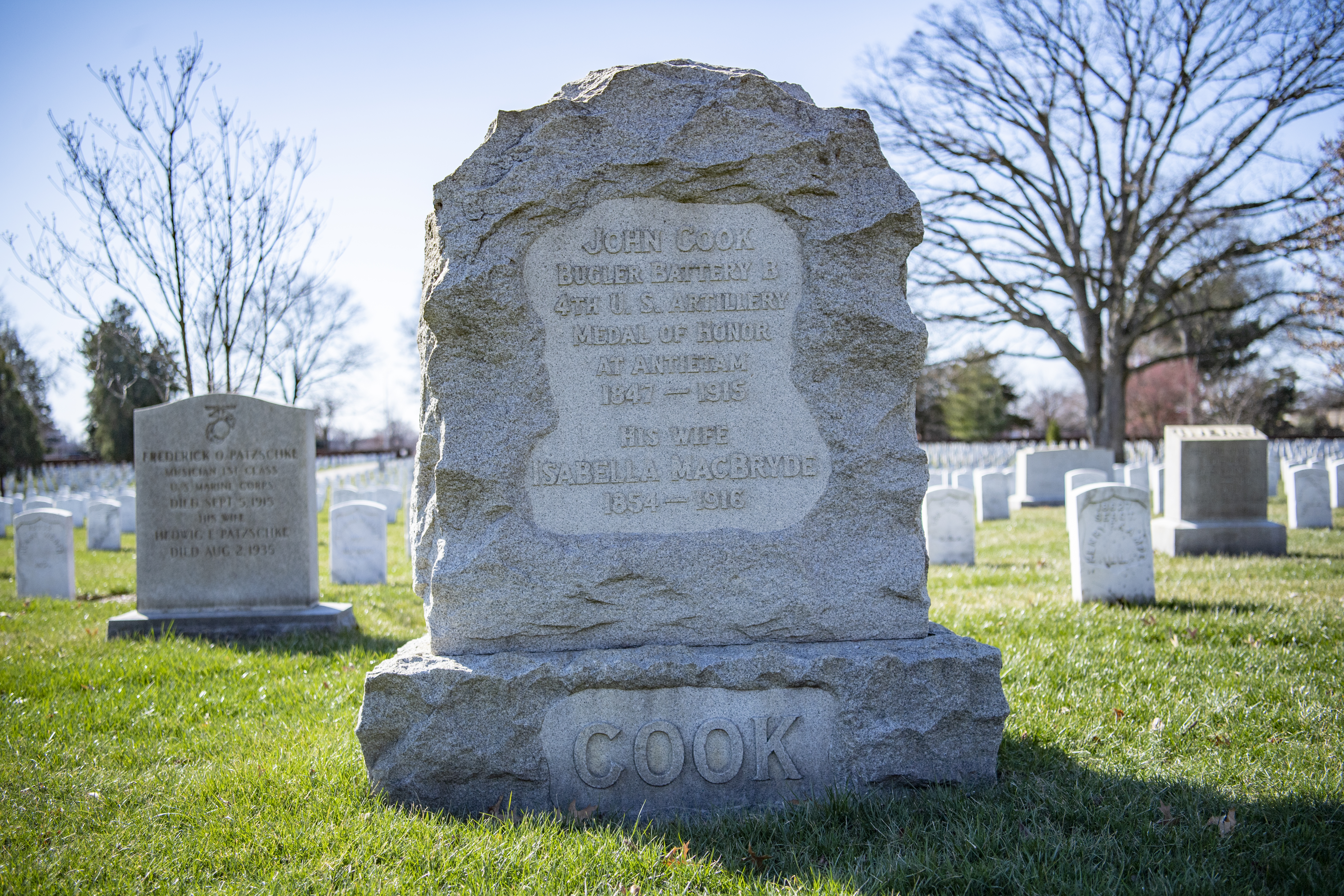
Grave at Arlington National Cemetery

Cook enlisted in the Union Army at age 14 in Cincinnati, Ohio, and served as a bugler in Battery B of the 4th U.S. Artillery Regiment. During the Battle of Antietam on September 17, 1862, his unit supported General John Gibbon's attack down the Hagerstown Turnpike. Immediately after unlimbering their guns, the battery came under fire from Confederate infantrymen in the West Woods. Cook helped a wounded officer to the rear and, upon returning to his unit, found that most of the cannoneers had been killed. Seeing a dead artilleryman with a full pouch of ammunition, Cook took the pouch and began servicing the cannons. He continued to work as a cannoneer throughout the attack, despite intense fire from Confederate soldiers who came within 15 feet of the guns.

The next year, Cook participated in the Battle of Gettysburg, where he carried messages across a half-mile of fire-swept terrain. During that battle, he helped destroy a damaged caisson to prevent it from falling into the hands of approaching Confederates.

For his actions at Antietam, Cook was awarded the Medal of Honor several decades later, on June 30, 1894. His official Medal of Honor citation reads:

Volunteered at the age of 15 years to act as a cannoneer, and as such volunteer served a gun under a terrific fire of the enemy.

Cook died at age 67 and was buried in Arlington National Cemetery, Arlington County, Virginia.

== See also ==
- List of Medal of Honor recipients
