= John Cook (cricketer) =

English cricketer

Charles John Cook (5 June 1946 – 20 December 2007) was an English first-class cricketer active 1974–75 who played for Nottinghamshire. He was born in Retford. John made his first-class debut for Notts vs India at Trent Bridge in June, 1974, conceding 105 runs for one wicket in 35 overs.
