= John Cook (professor, born 1739) =

John Cook (1739-1815) was Professor of Humanity at St Andrews University from 1769 to 1773 and Professor of Moral Philosophy at the same institution 1773 to 1814.

== Life ==
He was the son John Cook, minister of St Monans, who was born about 1711, and his wife Anne. They married on 11 March 1738. His mother, Anne, died on 12 February 1756, aged 48. (His father was the son of Thomas Cook, merchant, Elie, and Christian Gillespie. His father was educated at Univ. of St Andrews; licen. by Presb. of Haddington 4th Jan. 1732; called 12th Aug., and ord. 31st Oct. 1734; died 24 June 1751).

He succeeded to the estate of Newburn in Fife.

He died on 1 July 1815

He was Professor of Humanity at St Andrews University from 1769 to 1773 and Professor of Moral Philosophy 1773 to 1814.

He died in St Andrews and is buried in the churchyard of St Andrews Cathedral just west of St Rules Tower.

== Family ==
In 1770 he married Janet Hill, sister of his colleague, George Hill. Their children included George Cook and John Cook, Professor of Hebrew at St Andrews.

His grandson (son of George) was Moderator of the General Assembly of the Church of Scotland in 1859.
