= Alexander Hill (minister) =

Scottish minister

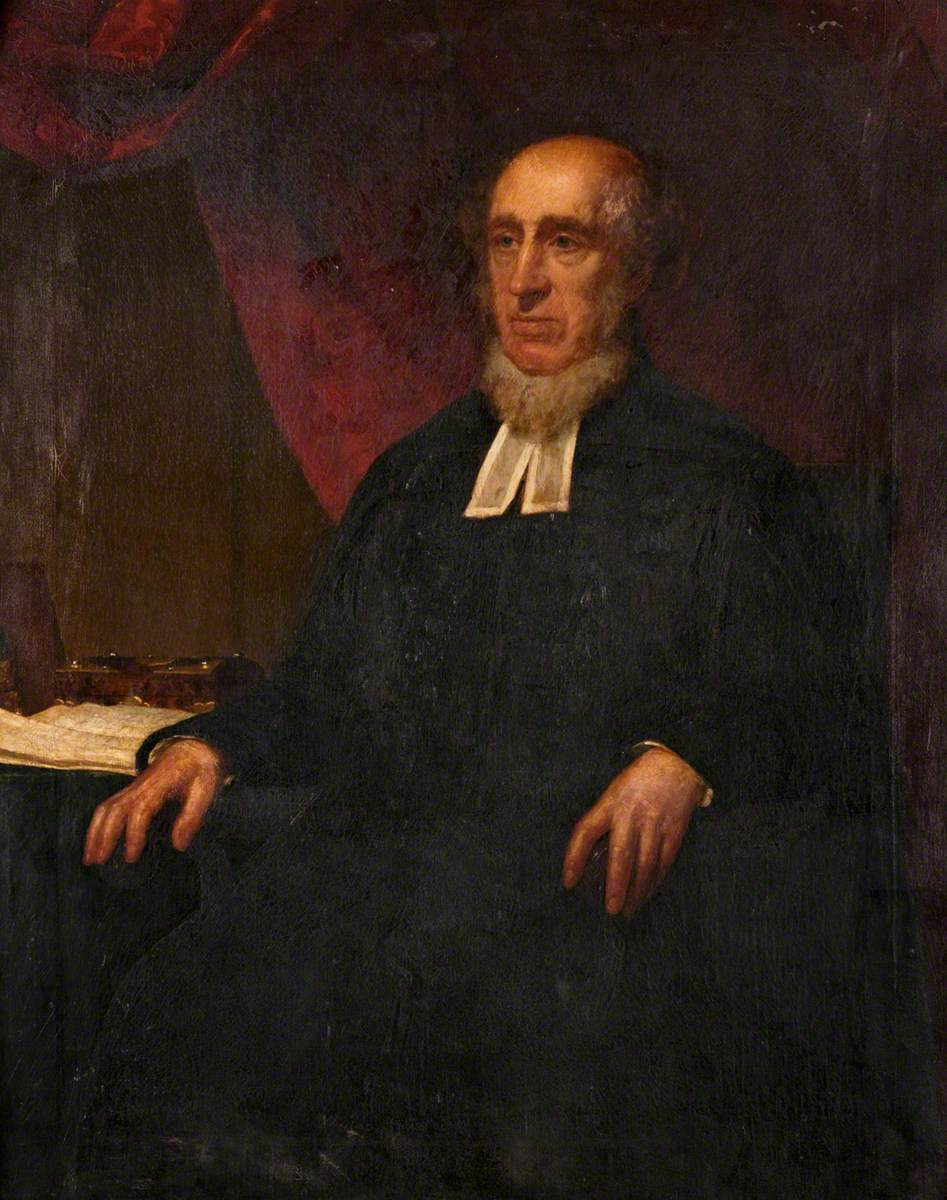
- portrait by John Graham-Gilbert
- Born: 19 July 1785
- Died: 27 January 1867 (aged 81)
- Parent(s): George Hill

Alexander Hill (1785–1867) was a Scottish minister of the Church of Scotland who served as Moderator of the General Assembly of the Church of Scotland in 1845. He was professor of divinity at the University of Glasgow.

== Life ==
Hill was born in St Andrews, Fife, on 19 July 1785, one of eleven children of Harriet Scott and Rev George Hill, Principal of the University of St Andrews.

He studied at the University of St Andrews graduating with an MA in 1804. In September 1806, he was licensed to preach as a Church of Scotland minister by the Presbytery of St Andrews.

He spent nine years travelling in England and Europe, taking various tutoring jobs. In July 1815 he was ordained as minister of Colmonell translating to Dailly in 1816 (both in South Ayrshire). He was awarded a Doctor of Divinity in 1828 by St Andrews.

From 1839 to 1863 he was Professor of Divinity at the University of Glasgow.

In 1840 he was proposed as Moderator of the General Assembly of the Church of Scotland but was beaten by Angus Makellar. In 1845 he succeeded Rev John Lee as Moderator and was succeeded in turn by Rev James Paul.

He lived at 12 College Court, Glasgow.

He died on 27 January 1867 in Ayr.

== Family ==
In April 1817 he married Margaret Crawford, daughter of Major Moris Crawford HEICS. They had nine children.

== Artistic recognition ==
His portrait was painted by John Graham Gilbert.

== Publications ==
- A Book of Family Prayers (1837)
