= John Hill (classicist) =

Scottish minister and classicist (1747–1805)

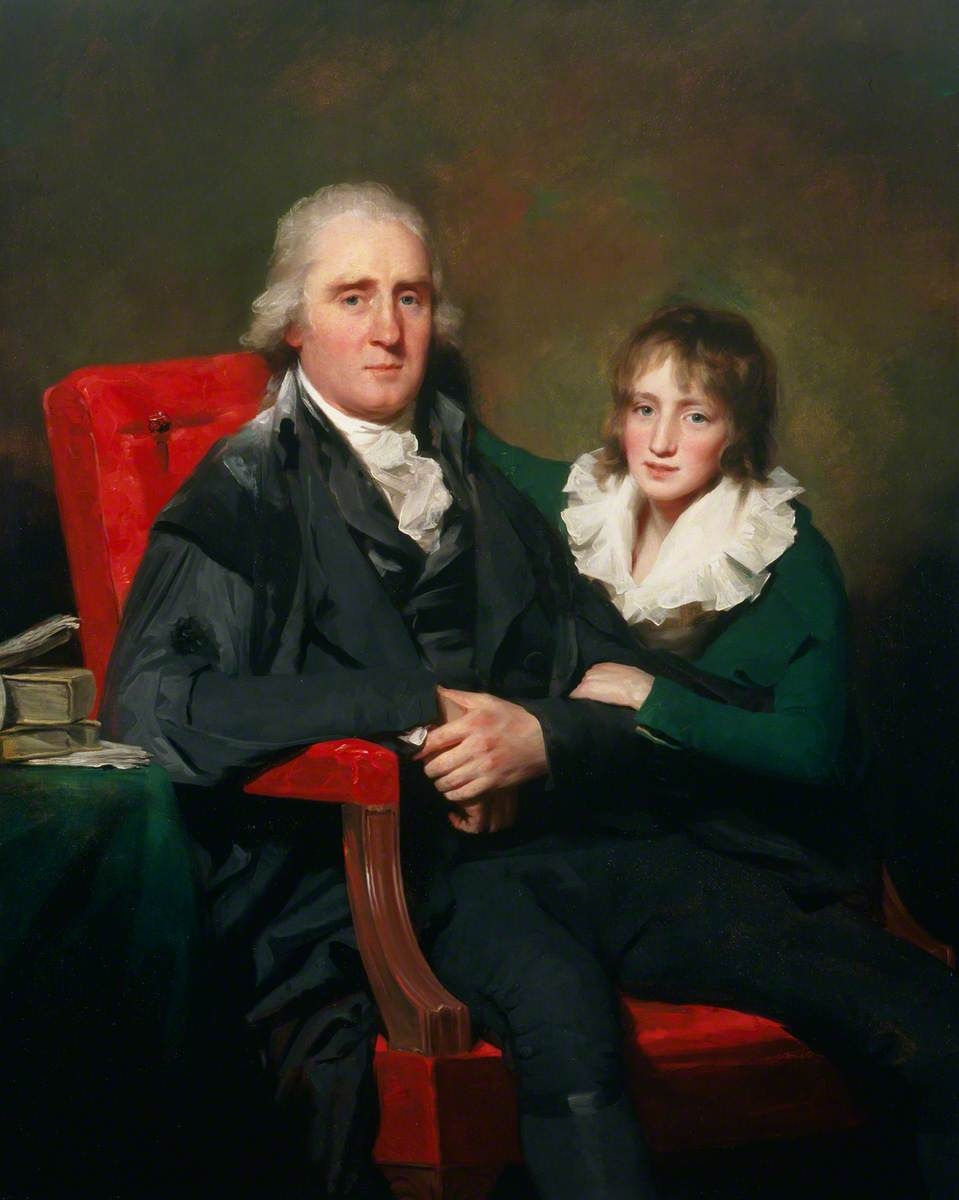
Practically full-length portrait of John Hill.

John Hill FRSE (27 April 1747 – 7 December 1805) was a Scottish minister and Professor of Humanity at the University of Edinburgh. In 1783 he was one of the joint founders of the Royal Society of Edinburgh.

== Life ==
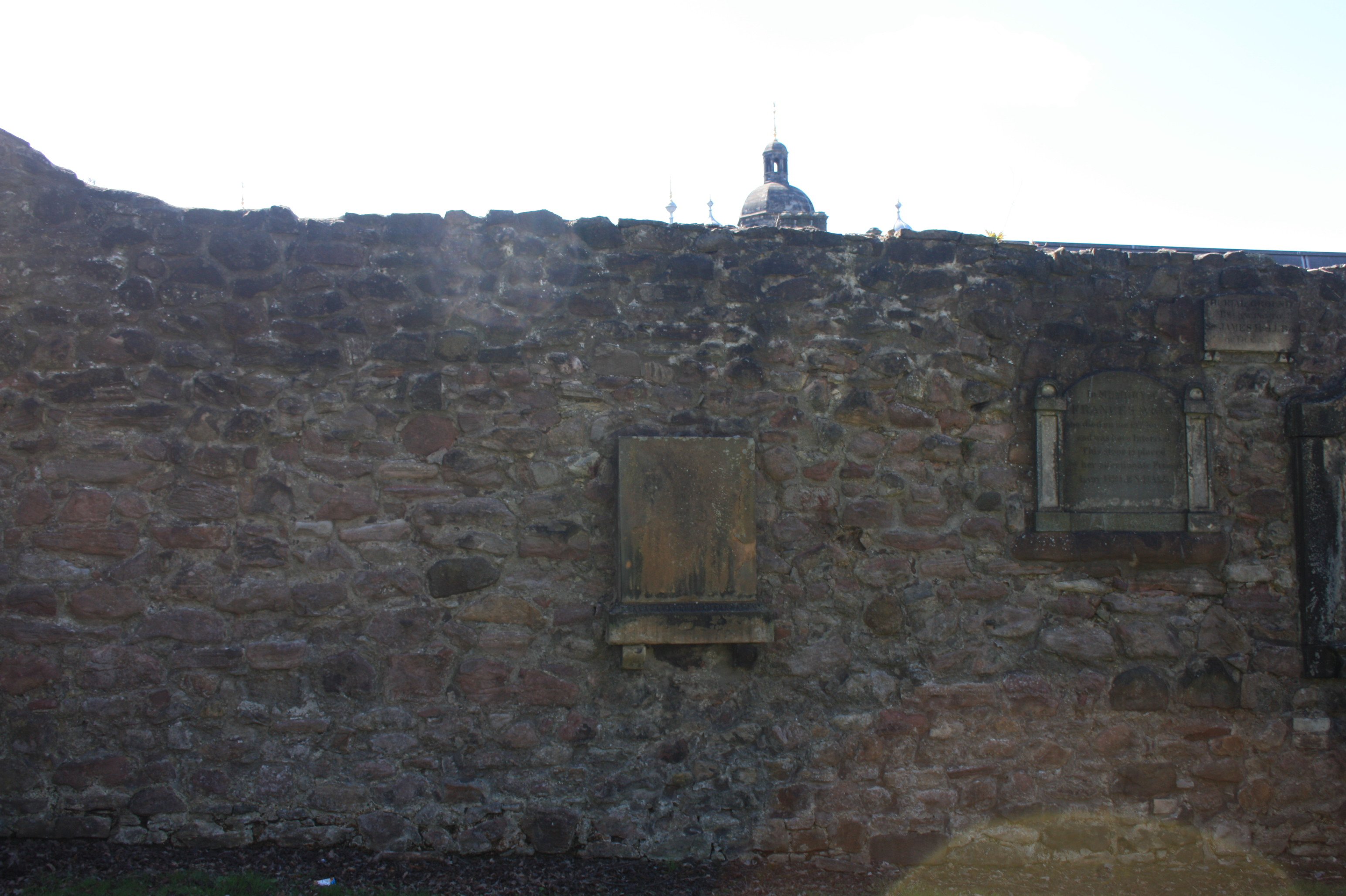
The remnant grave of Rev Prof John Hill, Greyfriars Kirkyard

He was born in St Andrews on 27 April 1747 the son of Rev John Hill (d. 1764), minister of St Andrews, and his wife Elizabeth Gowdie, daughter of John Gowdie. His mother died at or soon after his birth. His father remarried and had more children, including George Hill. He attended St Andrews Grammar School then the University of St Andrews where he graduated MA around 1767.

From 1775 until 1793 he was joint Professor of Humanity at the University of St Andrews. The University of Edinburgh awarded him an honorary doctorate (LLD) in 1787. He then moved to the University of Edinburgh as the sole Professor of Humanity.

His final years were spent at Brown Square in Edinburgh where he died on 7 December 1805. He is buried in Greyfriars Kirkyard against the western wall of the original area, north-west of the Adam mausoleum. The enclosure and monument are no longer present, but stood just south of the tablet to Sir James Hall. His house, just east of Greyfriars, was demolished in the 1860s to make way for Chambers Street.

His position at the University of Edinburgh was filled by his pupil Alexander Christison.

== Publications ==
- Latin Synonyms
- The Life of Hugh Blair (published 1807)

== Artistic recognition ==
He was portrayed around 1801 by Sir Henry Raeburn seated on Raeburn's favourite red chair. His son stands beside him.

== Family ==
He married Anne Macleod. Their daughter Elizabeth Hill (died 1869) married James Nairne of Claremont (1782–1847) in 1807, and their other daughter, Mary Hill (died 1857) married Thomas Guthrie Wright in 1809. He was uncle to Rev George Cook and Norman Macleod.
