= George Hill (minister) =

Scottish minister (1750–1819)

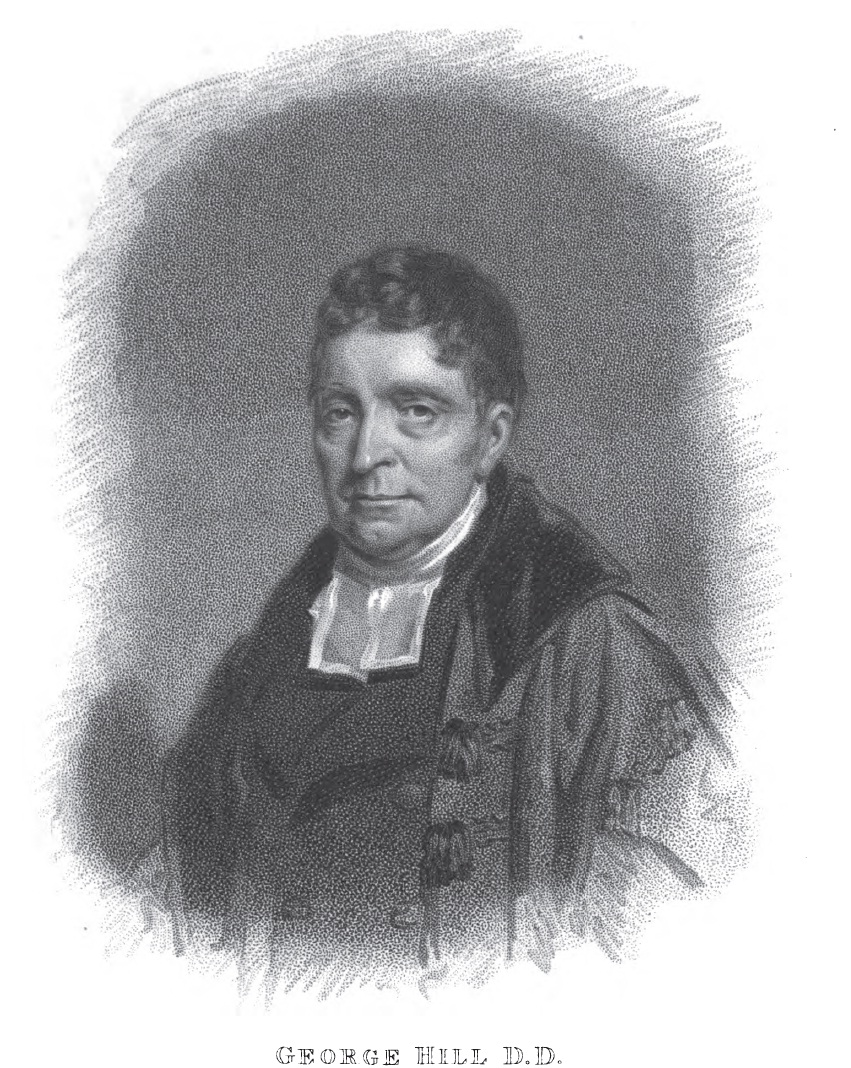
Portrait by John Watson Gordon

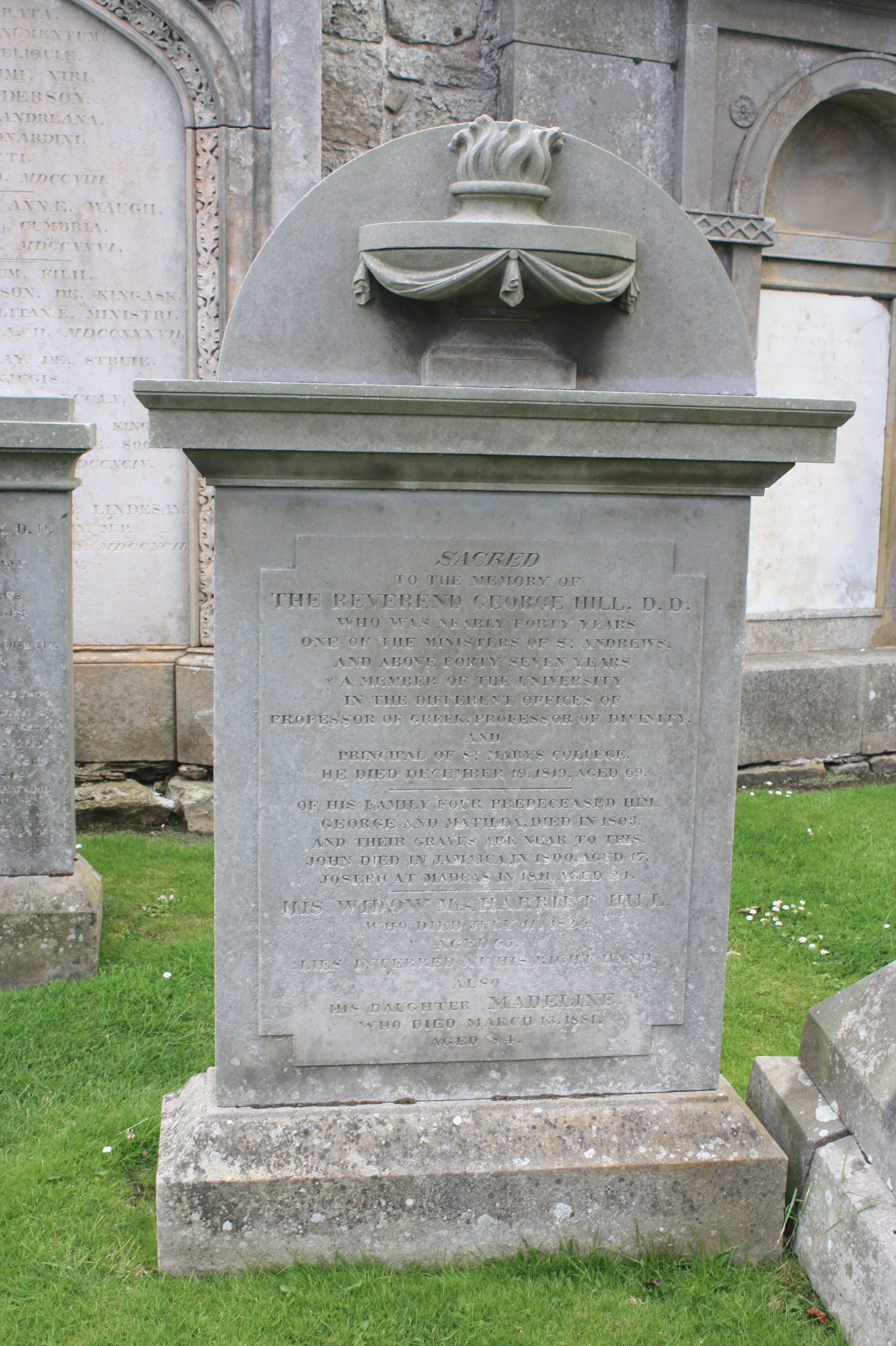
The grave of Hill, St Andrews Cathedral churchyard

George Hill FRSE (27 May 1750–19 November 1819) was a Minister of St Andrews. He was a joint founder of the Royal Society of Edinburgh in 1783 and Moderator of the General Assembly of the Church of Scotland in 1789, but an active member for much longer, where he succeeded William Robertson as leader of the Moderates. He was Principal of St Mary's College, St Andrews as well as Dean of the Chapel Royal and Dean of the Order of the Thistle.

== Life ==
George Hill was born on 27 May 1750 in St Andrews. His father, Rev John Hill, was one of the ministers of that town. He was the eldest son of his second wife, Jean M'Cormick, but had older siblings from the first marriage, including John Hill. His sister, Janet Hill, was the mother of Rev George Cook.

His family was intermarried with the other academic and clerical families in the town. George was educated with and mixed socially with the local aristocracy, including Thomas Erskine, 1st Baron Erskine, later Lord Chancellor and The Earl of Kinnoul. Both of these were very influential in the Crown patronage networks operated by Henry Dundas, effective ruler of Scotland (and also Chancellor of St Andrews University, which itself had extensive patronage powers in the University and in appointments to clerical livings).

He was educated at St Andrews Grammar School, then entered St Andrews University when he was eleven years old. There he displayed a remarkable memory and an aptitude for mathematics. He had intended to go on to study divinity but his father died when he was in his second year, leaving a large family in straitened circumstances. However, he went on to graduate M.A. when he was fourteen. After spending some time in London and Pembrokeshire as tutor to the son of the Member of Parliament Pryce Campbell, he accompanied his young charge to Edinburgh University, where he took the opportunity to continue his own studies in divinity. While there, he was regularly absorbed by the General Assembly of the Church of Scotland when it met there in the spring. He told his mother "spend most of my time there and have been highly entertained". He mixed with all the stars of the Scottish Enlightenment while in Edinburgh, being particularly repelled by what he thought were the vulgar manners and conversation of the philosopher David Hume.

He returned to St Andrews and became, on 21 May 1772, just short of his 22nd birthday, joint professor of Greek (though his aged predecessor still monopolised the salary, leaving George the private tuition fees). He lectured once a fortnight, going over homework assignments in the intervening week. His lecture notes indicate his course was far more a cultural studies course – covering history, geography, literature, drama and philosophy – which is just as well, as it appears many of his students could not recognise the Greek alphabet. He also organised "dancing assemblies" to keep them entertained, as well as entertaining supper parties to which the other professors were invited.

== Ministry ==
On 3 May 1775, using family connections, he managed to have himself licensed to preach the Gospel by the Presbytery of Haddington, and soon afterwards began assisting the ailing Principal Tullideph in his parochial church of St Leonards. He was a success in the pulpit, committing whole written sermons to his remarkable memory as he was too short-sighted to read them out. In 1775, he was offered the living of Coldstream by the Earl of Haddington, a pupil of his father's, but he turned it down, preferring to stick with his duties in St Andrews. In 1778, he was ordained by the Presbytery of Haddington. In 1779 he was being urged by Principal Robertson to accept an offer by the Town Council of a post in Edinburgh, but he had reasons to think prospects were opening up nearer home, so he politely declined.

Later that year (1779) Principal Murison of St Andrews died, which set off a series of vacancies, leading to George Hill being appointed to a Minister's living in St Andrews, while still retaining the professorship of Greek. A complaint was made to the General Assembly that it was in breach of Church law to have two posts, but this was dismissed and on 22 June 1780 George Hill was admitted to his father's old post of Minister of the Second Charge of St Andrews. He received the degree of Doctor of Divinity on 7 May 1787. On 2 January 1788, he became professor of divinity at St Mary's College. By 1799, it was clear that the principal of the university, his uncle Dr M'Cormick, was dying, and he was offered the chance to succeed him, but he turned it down as he would have lost money by having to give up his second charge minister's post for the less lucrative one of St Leonard's. He was made dean of the Chapel Royal instead, with an additional stipend. Three years later, on 27 July 1791 he was appointed principal of St Mary's College, while retaining his second charge minister's post. In 1808, upon the death of the incumbent, Hill was moved to the even more lucrative first charge of St Andrews.

== General Assembly ==
He was ordained an Elder on appointment as professor of Greek and ever since then had been returned as representative of the university, or of the presbytery, to the General Assembly of the Church of Scotland at its yearly meetings. When he became a minister and progressed as an academic, his influence in the assembly grew. His speaking skills were considerable and had always been an excellent networker, noted for his conciliatory approach. He had closely studied the history, law and procedures of the General Assembly, so he was a formidable operator. Principal William Robertson was the leader of the so-called Moderates. These saw themselves as enlightened Calvinists and Presbyterians who were prepared to compromise with the Government in many matters - in particular, over the issue of Patronage - but not on the spiritual independence of the Church. George Hill was one of this party, and took over the leadership of it when Robertson died. He was a very sincere Calvinist and a proud Presbyterian, but did not take a gloomy view of the former, and accepted that landowners (the Heritors) who paid a Minister's salary had some rights in their appointment. But he was fiercely protective of the independence of the Church. In 1782, when the Lord Advocate seemed to threaten him for his views that the usual address to the Crown was too political, he said

The Church of Scotland is independent of any party and any Ministry; he cared not for the threats of the learned gentleman, and he might tell his friends in power that he had said so.

During the French Revolutionary Wars, he vigorously opposed a plan to get Parish Ministers to urge support for a voluntary levy, as compromising the political independence of the Church and unseemly for a pacific profession. He was much opposed and vituperated but he stood firm. He would willingly contribute himself, but would "strip the gown from his back rather than obey an order to promote it from the pulpit". This was extraordinary for a man renowned as a British patriot - he expressed the hope "that this island will continue, to the latest ages, the fair seat of regulated freedom, of rational religion and public virtue"- and a Moderate (inveterate compromisers with the Government according to their enemies). The plan was dropped. But he was usually conciliatory as well as effective. In the year he was Moderator (1789) there were unusually violent squabbles over the appointment of a new Clerk to the General Assembly. At one point, Dr Hill had to suspend the Assembly. However, after the wrangles, the Assembly voted

That the thanks of the House should be given to the Moderator for his most impartial, dignified, and able conduct in a very delicate and uncommon situation during all the preceding diets of this venerable Assembly.

He continued to attend the Assembly until 1807 when he was too infirm to travel to Edinburgh. For instance, he argued strongly against Professor John Leslie who had written an Essay on Heat, which was thought to echo too closely some sceptical philosophic views of David Hume, and were therefore "destructive of religion". Principal Hill agreed when the Assembly had been asked to censure him. The public crowded in to hear the obscure debates, but in the end, the Assembly dismissed the complaints.

== Politics ==
Like most Presbyterians, he considered himself a Whig, and so no democrat. As indicated above, he thought the British Constitution was the most excellent protector of liberty in history. A sermon of his to that effect was printed in 1792, and 10,000 copies distributed, including 1000 in England. Earlier, although he thought that the British Government could have handled the American Colonists with more conciliation, he was in no doubt they were rebels to a legitimate and beneficent King. During his travels as a tutor, in 1768 he had witnessed some of the unrest associated with the election of John Wilkes ad Member of Parliament for Middlesex. He was appalled and it confirmed his horror of the common people participating in elections. During the trouble times of the French Revolutionary Wars his fear of popular unrest grew. In 1798 The General Assembly issued "A Warning and Admonition to the People of Scotland" (against popular unrest) which was produced by a committee and strongly supported by Hill. He also opposed Catholic Emancipation, holding Roman Catholics owed allegiance to a foreign power, the Pope, whom he considered a tool of the "power of France".

== Personal life ==
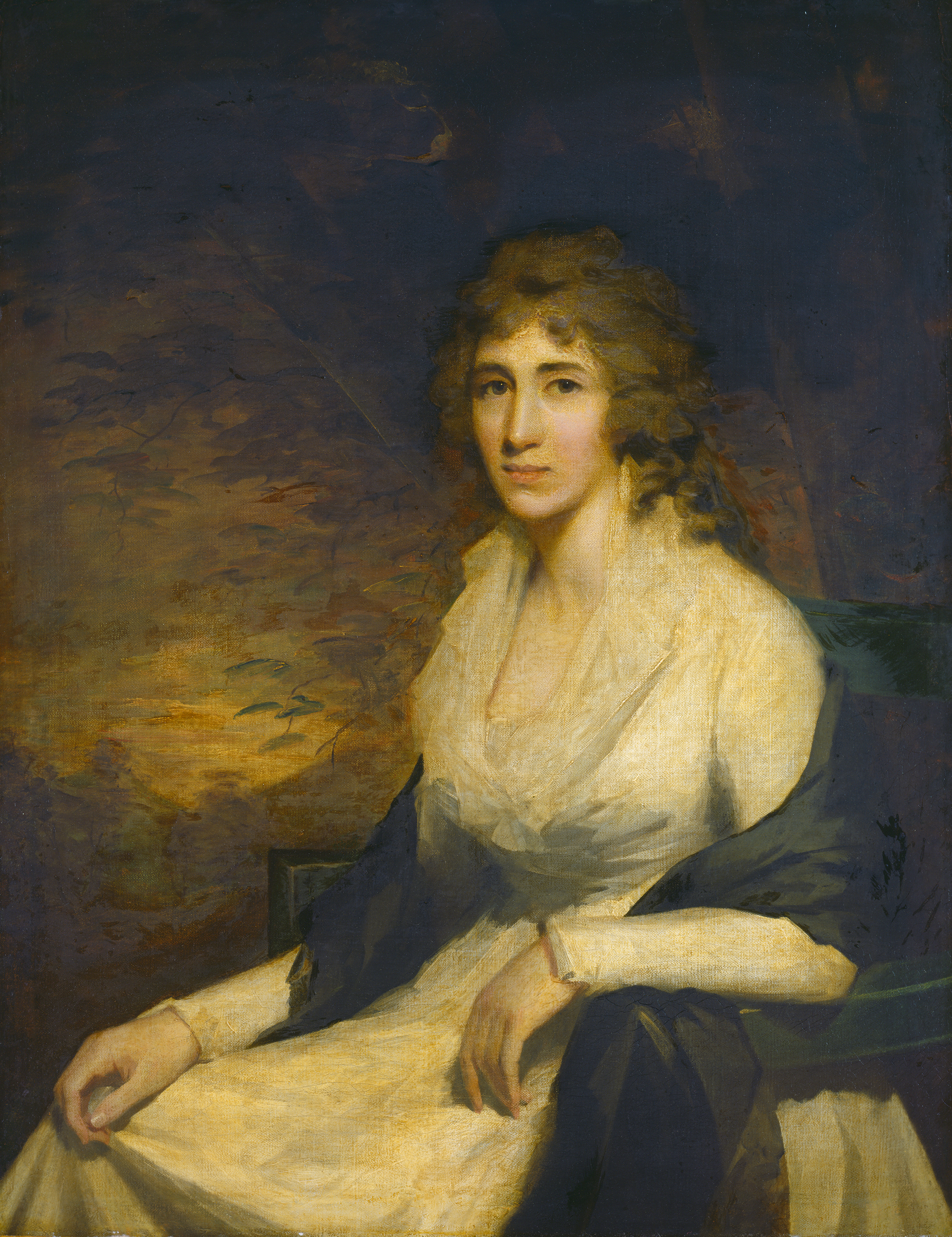
Mrs. George Hil, painting by Henry Raeburn, c. 1790/1800.

In 1782, he married Harriet Scott, daughter of Alexander Scott, an Edinburgh merchant and magistrate who had retired to St Andrews. Her portrait was painted by Henry Raeburn (as also, it is reputed, was that of Dr Hill as Principal). In 1800 his eldest son died in Jamaica and in 1803 his younger son George and a daughter died of plague. Others were ill and in danger. Another son died in the service of the East India Company, while yet another progressed to a position of importance there. His son Alexander Hill followed him into the Ministry. His daughter married a fellow academic, Dr Cook whose brother, George Cook, was his biographer. So he was the brother of Hill's son-in-law, and a beneficiary of his patronage. He paints a portrait of a kindly, humorous but serious man who loved and was loved by his family. In his Ministry he was universally loved, according to Mr Cook, while anonymous letters (actually by Andrew M Thomson) suggesting that he worked the patronage system to his own, and his sons' advantage are dismissed. He did not let religious or party political differences harm good relationships and he certainly "did not regard religious controversy as a proper subject for general conversation". He was a member of various societies - for the sons and widows of clergymen, a Bible Society in St Andrews. He was also a founding member of the Royal Society of Edinburgh and became rector of the university.

Returning from the General Assembly in 1807 he was seized by a violent illness, probably suffering a fit. He recovered somewhat but by 1816 began to decline, with some slight attacks of apoplexy, impaired speech and movement. Most of his parochial work was done by an assistant but he still liked to preach. In his last appearance in Church, in 1819, he stumbled as he approached the pulpit and lost his train of thought while trying to deliver a sermon. He was bedridden thereafter. He maintained a confidence in providence till the end, though ruefully commenting that his stipend for the year 1819 was the biggest he had ever had, whilst he had done the least for it that year.

He died on 19 November 1819. He is buried in the churchyard of St Andrews Cathedral. The grave lies just west of St Rules Tower within a large group of divines and professors.

== Family ==
His son, Alexander Hill, was Moderator of the General Assembly of the Church of Scotland in 1845.

His sister, Janet Hill, married Rev John Cook FRSE of Newburn, Fife. Their son (Hill's nephew) was the Very Rev George Cook who served as Moderator of the General Assembly of the Church of Scotland in 1825.

His sister, Anne Hill, married Rev Matthew Murray FRSE and they were parents to the geographer Hugh Murray.

His brother was the classicist, John Hill FRSE (1747-1805).

== Publications ==
- Advantages of searching the Scriptures. A sermon preached before the Society in Scotland for Propagating Christian Knowledge; at the anniversary meeting in the High Church of Edinburgh, on Thursday, June 7. 1787 (Edinburgh 1787)
- Heads of lectures in divinity, by Geo. Hill, ... 1796
- Instructions afforded by the present war, to the people of Great-Britain. A sermon preached at St. Andrew's, on Thursday the 18th of April 1793., ... 1793
- Present happiness of Great Britain. A sermon preached at St. Andrews, Oct. 7th, 1792. and in the High Church of Edinburgh, Nov. 18th, 1792., ... 1792
- Sermons, ... 1796
- Sermons by James Gillespie, D.D. ... published from the author's manuscrip [sic], by George Hill D.D 1796

== See also ==
- List of moderators of the General Assembly of the Church of Scotland

== Sources ==
- The Scots Magazine and Edinburgh Literary Miscellany, Volume LXVII 1805 The Scots Magazine and Edinburgh Literary Miscellany
- Scott, Hew Fasti ecclesiæ scoticanæ; the succession of ministers in the Church of Scotland from the reformation Edinburgh 1915
- Cook, Reverend George Life of the Late George Hill DD Archibald Constable and Company, Edinburgh 1820 The Life of the Late George Hill, D.D., Principal of St. Mary's College, St. Andrews
- Cook, Diana Helen (2013). "family tree". Change and Transition in a Professional Scots Family 1650-1900 (MPhil). University of Dundee. p. 143.
- Cook, George (1820). Life of the Late George Hill. Edinburgh: Archibald Constible and Co.

Church of Scotland titles
Preceded by Archibald Davidson	Moderator of the General Assembly of the Church of Scotland; 1789	Succeeded by John Walker
