= Robert Cook =

Robert Cook may refer to:

== Politics ==
- Robert Cook (Australian politician) (1867–1930), Australian politician
- Robert E. Cook (1920–1988), American attorney, politician, and judge
- Robin Cook (Robert Finlayson Cook, 1946–2005), British Labour Party politician
- Bob Cook, candidate in the 2002 Winnipeg municipal election for city councillor of Transcona Ward
- Robert Cook, 14th-century member of the Parliament of England for Dunwich
- Robert Douglas Cook, Canadian political candidate for the Gay Alliance Toward Equality

== Sports ==
- Robert Cook (swimmer) (born 1932), Bermudian former swimmer
- Robert Cook (wrestler) (1903–1963), British Olympic wrestler
- Bob Cook (professional wrestler) (born 1963), American professional wrestler
- Bob Cook (ice hockey) (1946–1978), Canadian ice hockey player
- Bobby Cook (basketball) (1923–2004), American basketball player
- Bobby Cook (footballer) (Robert Kenneth Cook, 1924–1997), English professional footballer

== Others ==
- Robert Cook (vegan) (1646–1726), Irish eccentric farmer and early veganism activist
- Robert Cook (veterinarian) (1930/1931–2025), British equine veterinarian
- Robert A. Cook (1912–1991), president of The King's College in New York
- Robert Barclay Cook (born 1966), British hotelier
- Robert C. Cook (1898–1991), American geneticist and demographer
- Robert Edwin Cook (1863–1946), American architect and engineer
- Robert F. Cook (1880–1958), Christian missionary in India
- Robert L. Cook (born 1952), computer graphics researcher and developer
- Robert Manuel Cook (1909–2000), classical scholar and classical archaeologist from England
- Robert O. Cook (1903–1995), American sound engineer
- Robert Percival Cook (1906–1989), Australian-born biochemist
- Robert Raymond Cook (1937–1960), Canadian mass murderer
- Veda Hlubinka-Cook (born 1964, Robert Cook), video game programmer and co-founder of Metaweb
- Derek Raymond (pen name of Robert William Arthur Cook; 1931–1994), English crime writer
- Robert Cook (jurist), magistrate of the Australian Capital Territory

== See also ==
- Robert Coke (disambiguation)
- Cook (surname)
- Bert Cook (disambiguation)
- Bobby Cook (disambiguation)
- Rob Cook (disambiguation)
- Robert Cooke (disambiguation)
