= Albert Cook =

Albert Cook may refer to:

- Albert Cook (footballer) (1880–1949), soccer player
- Albert John Cook (1842–1916), American entomologist and zoologist
- Sir Albert Ruskin Cook (1870–1951), British missionary in Uganda
- Albert Spaulding Cook (1925–1998), American comparative literature scholar and poet
- Albert Stanburrough Cook (1853–1927), American Old English philologist and academic

== See also ==
- Bert Cook (disambiguation)
- Albert Cooke (disambiguation)
