= John Christodoulou =

British property developer (born 1965)

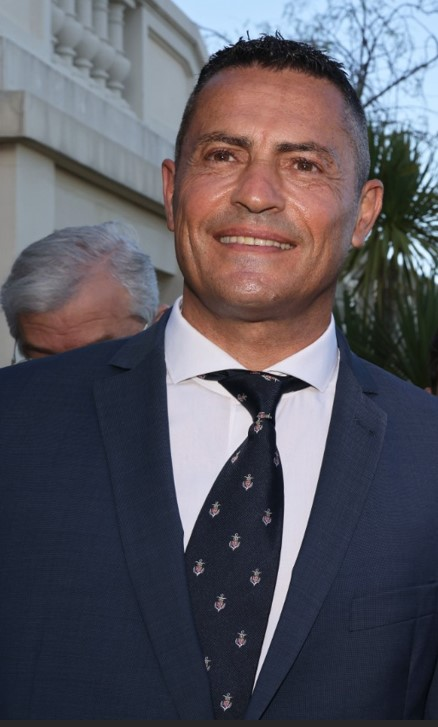
- Born: Yannis Theophani Christodoulou; 24 May 1965 (age 61); Nicosia, Cyprus
- Occupation: Property developer
- Known for: Owner, Yianis Group
- Children: 4

Yiannis Theophani "John" Christodoulou (Greek: Γιάννης Θεοφάνη Χριστοδούλου; born 24 May 1965) is a Monaco-based British-Cypriot billionaire property developer and the owner of Yianis Group, a privately held company with a portfolio of residential, hotel, retail and leisure properties in the UK and Europe. According to The Times, Christodoulou is one of England's largest freeholder landlords through Yianis Group.

== Early life ==
Christodoulou was born on 24 May 1965 in Kaimakli, Nicosia. His family fled during the 1974 Turkish invasion of Cyprus, and he came to the UK as a child. In a 2022 interview he said his experience as a refugee had shaped his approach to business, describing himself as "still insecure".

== Career ==
After leaving school at 16, Christodoulou trained as a diamond mounter and set up his own business in Hatton Garden, London's jewellery quarter. At 18 he persuaded the landlord of a small shop there to rent him a workshop, accepting discounted jewellery repairs as part of the rent. He later took jobs on construction sites before developing his own buildings, borrowing from banks as his assets grew.

He started at 19 with a studio flat in Finchley, north London, and now owns property in London Docklands through his Yianis Group. With circa 2 million square foot of property, Christodoulou is the second largest freeholder in Canary Wharf after Canary Wharf Group, which is jointly owned by Canadian private equity firm Brookfield and the Qatar Investment Authority.

Christodoulou owns 100% of Yianis Group, which owns the London hotels Marriott Canary Wharf and the Canary Riverside Plaza (formerly Four Seasons Canary Wharf). He also owns heritage asset Wool House, a grade II listed former Victorian warehouse in Whitechapel. In 2019, it was reported that the Cyprus-born British freehold tycoon was working on an eco-friendly development on an island off Sardinia.

In 2012, several overleveraged hotel-owning Yianis Group interests that came under the Dania Properties name went into administration, which saw Christodoulou lose the Grade II listed 148 bedroom hotel Marriott Victoria & Albert Hotel in Manchester and the four-AA-star, 895-bedroom Park Inn by Radisson located close to Heathrow Airport.

The value of Christodoulou's property holdings increased by 25% in the 12 months to April 2019 to £1.5 billion, due to a buoyant London rental market.

In October 2021, Christodoulou had been set to take over Cypriot professional football club Omonia Nicosia from current major stakeholder Stavros Papastavrou, a New York-based Cypriot investor, in a £30 million deal, but talks reportedly broke down over the issue of him having to sell the shares on to Omonia fans after five years, one of at least two clauses in the original management deal with Papastavrou that Christodoulou had sought to scrub.

Christodoulou is a critic of Cyprus' lengthy planning process, stating that it is stopping foreign investment.

== Personal life ==
Christodoulou lives in Monaco with his wife and four children. He is a supporter of the Cypriot football club Omonia Nicosia. In April 2023, Albert II, Prince of Monaco, visited Cyprus at Christodoulou's invitation.

== Wealth ==
According to the Sunday Times Rich List, Christodoulou became a billionaire in 2015. The 2026 list estimated his fortune at £2.7 billion, ranking him 59th. As of November 2026, Forbes estimated his net worth at US$1.1 billion.

== Controversies ==
Christodoulou's business practices have attracted considerable media attention. The Times notes that "his company has been challenged by residents of a luxury development of more than 300 flats who complained they were being charged sky-high service charges and unreasonably high sums for repairs." This is a reference to Canary Riverside, where Christodoulou was stripped of day-to-day management control over the property in October 2016, with a professional court appointee installed to act in the best interests of the site. Leaseholders were able to prove fault against CREM, a subsidiary company, that they had suffered over many years due to poor management of the estate, in particular a lack of transparency surrounding how their money was being used. Tribunal judges found that the managing agent Marathon Estates (a company set-up in 2011 by Richard Paul, a chartered accountant and partner at accountancy firm Nyman Libson Paul, to manage the Christodoulou-owned estates of Canary Riverside and 1 West India Quay) "has been unable to produce accurate financial information on time, including budgets and accounts, has not engaged with leaseholders and has a muddled hierarchy of command."

Similar complaints of estate mismanagement by Christodoulou leaseholders at 1 West India Quay have emerged in a Sunday Times feature on the so-called leasehold property scandal. Leaseholders there have taken legal action against Christodoulou over expensive energy bills, raising concerns that they have been subsidising his commercial interest on the site. In May 2014, they won the right to form a recognised residents' association, despite Christodoulou having hired a QC and spent £74,000 in trying to block their efforts. In 2022, it was reported that Christodoulou had admitted before a tribunal that he had overcharged the 1 West India Quay flat owners by 26% on utilities, wrongly adding commercial rate VAT and a climate change levy to their bills for heating, cooling and hot water.

Christodoulou has also been named in parliament, with former MP for Poplar and Limehouse Jim Fitzpatrick claiming that the litigation and threats faced by the court-appointed manager at Canary Riverside are "little short of harassment". A former secretary of the 1 West India Quay residents' association has been subjected to a defamation threat by Christodoulou's lawyers, as have more than 100 leaseholders at neighbouring Canary Riverside. In July 2018, his lawyers unsuccessfully sought to prevent the then local MP, Jim Fitzpatrick, from raising the case of Canary Riverside in parliament. It had been claimed that Fitzpatrick's intervention could breach sub judice rules.

In April 2020, The Guardian reported that tenants at Olympic House, Simpson House and St John's Court in Somerford Grove, east London, were denied a 20% rent cut, in spite of the COVID-19 pandemic and their allegedly precarious employment situations. The renters are said to have been told by the lettings agent, acting on behalf of the three corporate landlords all "majority owned" by Christodoulou, that the request was "unreasonable" and "unrealistic". The agent had suggested that "any drop in tenants' income would be minimised by a reduction in spending on holidays, entertainment, travel, clothes and lunches." London mayor Sadiq Khan tweeted: "This is a prime example of how unrealistic it is to expect landlords & tenants to sort difficulties out amongst themselves," and that the story is "exactly why" he is calling on government to "introduce immediate measures to protect tenants who go into arrears" because of the public health emergency. These tenants formed an advocacy group Somerford Grove Renters with the London Renters Union. They were later threatened with legal action by the lettings agent and alleged harassment and surveillance by agent-hired security guards. After continuing to make public statements about the situation, several tenants received eviction notices in August in what Hackney Mayor Philip Glanville called a "revenge eviction" and "a direct response to [the tenants] seeking greater security for themselves and their neighbours at a time of crisis."

On 21 September 2020, around 70 rental and leasehold tenants protested outside Canary Riverside Plaza, which is part of the upmarket mixed use Canary Riverside scheme owned by the Yianis Group, to push back against unfair practices by Christodoulou and the government's ending of the eviction ban. Joined by local MP Apsana Begum, the protesters hand-delivered a letter to the Yianis Group headquarters.

On 9 November 2020, former shadow home secretary Diane Abbott tabled an early day motion in parliament urging John Christodoulou to negotiate "fair and reasonable rent adjustments" with affected tenants in Somerford Grove. It noted that "far from entering into negotiations, residents have been harassed and spied on".

In July 2021, it was reported that a tribunal had ordered Christodoulou to compensate four of his former tenants in Somerford Grove £19,000 for renting them properties as illegal HMOs. In June 2022, the Upper Tribunal heard an appeal by the landlord where the tenants won again, increasing the award to £22,500 and permitting an application for costs due to the landlord withdrawing from the appeal at a "late stage without any explanation". The judge noted that the Mr Christodoulou's landlord companies could not produce gas safety or energy efficiency certificates in addition to not obtaining the property licences required by law and concluded from this that "the Landlord's business practices involved a systematic or institutional neglect of regulatory requirements".

In August 2022, the Upper Tribunal in a different case ordered that Mr Christodoulou's landlord company at Canary Riverside, Riverside CREM 3 Limited, pay £67,000 towards the legal costs of the independent court-appointed manager and the leaseholders at the site for its "unreasonable" conduct, having instigated a meritless appeal to the Upper Tribunal while conducting the appeal in a manner that was also deemed unreasonable, inexplicably advancing a new legal point at a very late stage in the proceedings that should have been used in the original case, if used at all. The Upper Tribunal determined that "the decision to do so can only have been taken with a view to impressing on the respondents the appellant’s determination not to back down, whatever the cost and thereby to harass and intimidate some or all of them." The costs order continued: "This litigation is being conducted with the intensity and expense and in the style of commercial litigation … the [Landlord] has full access to the FTT and to the [Upper] Tribunal and appears to be prepared to spend whatever it takes to promote its interests through litigation. The proposed [costs] order is not required to punish the appellant but to protect the respondents from its unreasonable conduct". In the appeal hearing, the landlord was reportedly admonished by Deputy Chamber President Judge Martin Rodger KC for an "extremely unattractive" approach to tribunal. Mr Christodoulou had sought to resile from Canary Riverside's management order for independent and transparent estate management and also attempted to force the residential flat leaseholders to pay the £355,000 unpaid debt of a commercial tenant, Virgin Active, which had wiped out rent and service charge arrears at High Court as part of a restructuring and cross-class cram down.

Christodoulou has been described as a "tax exile", and for a number of years lived in the UK enjoying the controversial non-domiciled tax status. He left the UK shortly before then chancellor of the exchequer Alistair Darling was to introduce a new £30,000 a year charge on nondoms who have lived in the country for more than seven years. In October 2021, The Times newspaper reported that the low-profile billionaire property tycoon had covertly claimed millions of furlough money from the taxpayer despite telling a London audience that he was self-reliant through the crisis and criticising those businesses which did need government assistance. Christodoulou's use of shell and foreign incorporated companies to secure up to £6.5 million in taxpayer money occurred despite his public comment that "we borrowed no money from the government … because it shows the wrong sign." After legal letters from Christodoulou's solicitors, Cypriot media outlets Knews, the English edition of Kathimerini Cyprus, and Economy Today apologised to Christodoulou for publishing the Times of London's furlough story and agreed that "it is clear that the funds received by Christodoulou's companies from state support schemes were solely for the benefit of the companies' employees. The funds did not benefit the companies themselves or Christodoulou personally. Neither Christodoulou nor his companies have received any loans from the government. The participation of some of Christodoulou's companies in state support schemes was exclusively for the purpose of supporting employees whose employment was suspended due to pandemic-related restrictions that had been imposed". By contrast, The Times article has not been withdrawn following Christodoulou's legal complaint that it is defamatory and untrue.

In December 2022, a property tribunal ruled in the Canary Riverside case that John Christodoulou landlord companies, CREM and Octagon, misappropriated approximately £1.6 million in secret insurance commissions from flat owners. This represented leaseholder overcharging of between £150,000 to £200,000 per annum. The tribunal heard that Westminster Management Services is the employing entity of all Yianis Group personnel. Christodoulou and WMS were unable to demonstrate that the payments were legitimate and could not produce any contract with the insurers. The tribunal also heard that WMS was "just told" about the fees payable and the cash was then sent across by Reich, an FCA regulated broker. The tribunal criticised Christodoulou's "complete lack of transparency with leaseholders regarding these commission payments paid since 2010" as "lamentable", while noting the "woefully inaccurate" disclosure originally provided by Reich, which understated its commission by almost half. The decision was reported in the Financial Times as a "rare victory in service charges" for UK leaseholders, a development it suggested lends support to a recent warning by the FCA that freeholders, managing agents and brokers "may be selecting insurance policies that maximize their own remuneration . . . rather than the policy that offers the best value for the leaseholders". In March 2024, the Upper Tribunal ruled in the appeal that the landlord "had failed to demonstrate" it was due any more than the £579,039 of the £1,638,709 that they had charged to the estate between 2010 and 2020, with £1,059,570 not payable by the leaseholders. The overcharging represented 65% of the landlord insurance commissions.

In March 2024, the UK government and Michael Gove, the then Secretary of State, commenced legal action against Christodoulou's companies to pay £20.5 million towards remediation of the unsafe blocks of flats they own at Canary Riverside in London Docklands. It marked the first time the UK government has pursued a freeholder landlord for a remediation contribution order under new powers in the Building Safety Act 2022.

In March 2025, Christodoulou's companies were described by a judge as a "rogue landlord" in a case where they were found to be operating unlicensed houses in multiple occupation, and did not meet legally required safety and quality standards. The First-tier Tribunal awarded residents of 15 flats in Olympic House and Simpson House, Hackney, London, Rent Repayment Orders for £263,555. The Times newspaper reports this is the biggest single rent repayment order case in British history. Meanwhile, Christodoulou's interests have still not paid up the £30,000 ordered to be handed over to the first successful group of Somerford Grove tenants and the companies implicated have either been liquidated or sold on to other companies in the group at a large loss or undervalue seemingly in order to get around the law.

On 1 August 2025 at 8pm a BBC One documentary called For Rent: Rooms Under the Radar included a segment on the ongoing fight by members of the London Renters Union to get John Christodoulou's companies to pay Rent Repayment Orders (RROs) as ordered by the courts. Tarah Welsh, a BBC reporter, said the tenants of Olympic House and Simpson House has discovered their "homes were unlicensed HMOs – a criminal offense on the part of the landlord companies... these companies were owned by John Christodoulou". A group of 50 former tenants won over a quarter of a million pounds in RROs but the reporter said "victory didn’t bring justice – they still haven’t received the money they were awarded". Marc Sutton, one of the organisers said "It’s a fight that keeps on going".

In 2025, Christodoulou wrote to industry publication LandlordZone saying "all tenant claims have been satisfied", requesting the outlet remove its article about him. Novara Media reported that none of the Simpson House and Olympic House tenants who were awarded £263,555.69 had received any money from his companies. LandlordZone removed its article but Christodoulou did not reply to Novara Media's repeated enquiries about whether he had intentionally misled the publication. In May 2025, Christodoulou also emailed Novara Media and the Leasehold Knowledge Partnership requesting they deindex articles about him and his business practices saying it was causing "long-standing damage to my reputation, despite my efforts to move forward and contribute positively through philanthropy and business practices" - both declined. Several outlets, including Novara Media, The Negotiator, Property Industry Eye, and The Hackney Citizen, subsequently received copyright infringement notices from Google via a company called Lumen regarding their articles about Christodoulou. Some of these were based on fraudulent Tumblr posts backdated to appear as if they were original content. Christodoulou denied submitting the copyright complaints, saying he only requested deindexing directly from the outlets.

In 2026, it was reported that, around five years after Christodoulou acquired the freehold of Beetham Tower, Manchester following a high-profile High Court action he won as the leaseholder of the development's hotel, and around 12 years after facade defects were first identified, the permanent remediation work he had successfully sued to secure had still not been carried out, despite him now owning and operating the building. Leaseholders said they were "trapped" in their flats, which were blighted by high service charges and could reportedly only be marketed to cash buyers or at auction because of difficulties obtaining mortgage finance, while some faced financial difficulties, mental health problems and the prospect of bankruptcy. Education Secretary and local MP Lucy Powell described the situation as a "nightmare" and a "living hell" for residents.

== Philanthropy and honours ==
In 2016 Christodoulou founded the Yianis Christodoulou Foundation, a company limited by guarantee registered in London, which states that it supports disadvantaged children and their families in the UK and abroad. During the COVID-19 pandemic the foundation funded care packs for staff at The Royal London Hospital and at public hospitals in Cyprus.

In April 2022 Christodoulou's company, Yianis Group, offered free accommodation for a year to about 750 Ukrainian refugees at two of its hotels, in Liverpool and Southend-on-Sea.

In 2022 Christodoulou received the Holy Humanitarian Cross of the Church of Cyprus and a Medal of Outstanding Contribution at a ceremony organised by the Presidency of the Republic of Cyprus. In November 2023 the Cypriot government gave him an award for his charitable work and for promoting Cyprus abroad.
