= Yianis Group =

British property development and investment company

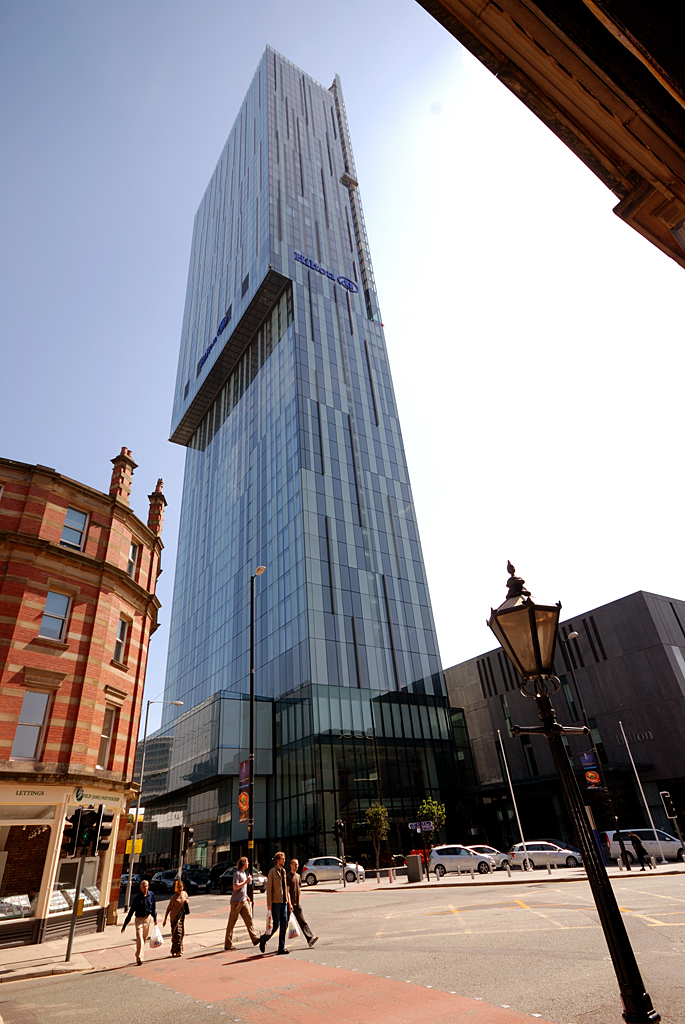
- Beetham Tower, Manchester, a major Yianis Group asset
- Type: Private
- Industry: Real estate
- Founder: John Christodoulou
- Headquarters: Westferry Circus, Canary Wharf, London, United Kingdom
- Key people: John Christodoulou (Chairman)
- Owner: John Christodoulou
- Website: www.yianis.com

Yianis Group is a British property development and investment company based in London, wholly owned by the British-Cypriot billionaire John Christodoulou. The group owns a portfolio of freehold office, residential, hotel, retail, and leisure properties across the United Kingdom and Europe.

== Overview ==
Yianis Group operates through multiple subsidiaries that acquire, manage, and invest in real estate assets, often long-term freeholds in prime urban locations. The company is particularly noted for its hotel investments under global brands such as Marriott, Hilton, and Radisson, as well as mixed-use developments combining commercial and residential properties.

== Major assets ==
Yianis Group holds a diversified portfolio of commercial and hospitality properties across several major UK cities.

In London, the group owns two landmark hotels situated in Canary Wharf — the London Marriott Hotel Canary Wharf and the Canary Riverside Plaza Hotel. These properties form part of the broader Canary Riverside development, a mixed-use complex comprising hotels, residences, offices, and leisure facilities along the River Thames.

In Manchester, Yianis Group owns the Hilton Manchester Deansgate, located within the 47-storey Beetham Tower, one of the city’s most recognisable skyscrapers. Following a protracted legal dispute concerning façade repairs, the group’s subsidiary, Blue Manchester Ltd, acquired the freehold of the building in 2021.

In Liverpool, the company owns the Radisson Blu Hotel, Liverpool, a waterfront property located in the city’s central business district. The group also owns the Park Inn by Radisson Palace Hotel, Southend-on-Sea in Southend-on-Sea, a historic seafront hotel overlooking the Thames Estuary.

Beyond these major hospitality assets, Yianis Group holds a range of freehold commercial properties across London, including Wool House (E1), Zeus House (N1), Olympic House (N16), St John’s Court (N16), and Simpson House (N16).

== Legal and regulatory issues ==
=== Canary Riverside litigation and insurance commissions ===
At the Canary Riverside estate in London Docklands, leaseholders brought proceedings against a Yianis-linked freeholder over excessive service charges and undisclosed insurance commissions. In December 2022, a property tribunal ruled that landlord entities had overcharged leaseholders by approximately £1.6 million. In March 2024, the Upper Tribunal upheld the decision, finding that the landlord "had failed to demonstrate" entitlement to more than £579,039 of £1.63 million in insurance costs, meaning around £1.06 million was not payable by leaseholders.

=== Building Safety Act enforcement ===
In April 2024, the UK government began proceedings under the Building Safety Act 2022 requiring Yianis Group to contribute an estimated £20.5 million toward building-safety remediation at Canary Riverside — one of the first cases brought under the new legislation.

=== Additional cost orders ===
In September 2025, the Upper Tribunal ordered Yianis-controlled landlord entities to pay £52,760 in costs to leaseholders and estate managers for “unreasonable conduct” in prolonged litigation.

== See also ==
- John Christodoulou
- Beetham Tower, Manchester
- Canary Wharf
