= Robert Cooke =

Robert Cooke may refer to:

== Politicians ==
- Robert Cooke (Conservative politician) (1930–1987), British Conservative Party politician
- Robert Cooke (Parliamentarian) (1598–1643), English politician who sat in the House of Commons between 1640 and 1643

== Others ==
- Robert Cooke (officer of arms) (died 1593), herald, Clarenceux King of Arms under Elizabeth I of England
- Robert Cooke (organist) (1768–1814), English organist
- Robert Cooke (physician) (1880–1960), American researcher into allergies
- Robert Cooke (artist) (1815–1843), American artist
- Bob Cooke (cricketer) (born 1943), former English cricketer
- Robert Cooke (cricketer) (1900–1957), English cricketer
- Robbie Cooke (1957–2021), English footballer

== See also ==
- Bert Cooke (disambiguation)
- Robert Cook (disambiguation)
- Robert Coke (disambiguation)
- Cooke (surname)
