= Wool House =

Victorian warehouse in England

Coordinates: 51.51236°N 0.06701°W

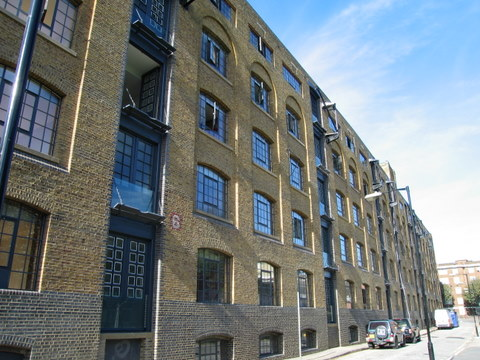
Wool House seen from corner of Forbes and Pinchin Streets.

Wool House is a grade II listed Victorian wool warehouse at 74 Backchurch Lane, in the London Borough of Tower Hamlets. It was originally five storeys tall, and spanned a total of 137,455 square feet (12,770.0 m^{2}). An additional floor was constructed on the roof in the early 2000s, creating an additional 12,000 square feet (1,100 m^{2}) of floorspace. The warehouse is one of two that were constructed on Backchurch lane in the late 1880s for Browne & Eagle, a wool storage firm.

Wool House underwent a series of redevelopments in the early 21st century. The first of these took place between 1998 and 2003, when the building was refurbished and converted into office space. An extra floor constructed from lightweight materials was also added. In 2005 the offices closed down and the building was redesigned for residential usage. The residential conversion was completed in October 2006. The Wool House is now owned by Octagon Investments which is part of the Yianis Group owned by property magnate John Christodoulou who according to the Times Rich List 2007 is the 82nd wealthiest person in Britain with an estimated personal fortune of £835m.

The warehouse was the setting for the second series of the BBC television series Dragons Den.
