= Herbert Cook (disambiguation) =

Herbert Cook (1868–1939) was an art historian.

Herbert Cook may also refer to:

- Herbert Cook (rugby) (1923–1986), rugby player
- Herbert Bramwell Cook (1936–2017), New Zealand gastroenterologist
- Herbert Cook (footballer), English footballer

== See also ==
- Herbert Cooke (disambiguation)
- Bert Cook (disambiguation)
