= Bobby Cook =

Bobby Cook may refer to:

- Bobby Cook (basketball) (1923–2004), American basketball player
- Bobby Cook (footballer) (1924–1997), English footballer
- Bobby Lee Cook (1927–2021), American attorney

== See also ==
- Robert Cook (disambiguation)
