= Bert Cook =

Bert Cook may refer to:

- Bert Cook (basketball) (1929–1998), American basketball player
- Bert Cook (footballer) (1889–after 1919), English footballer
- Bert Cook (rugby) (1923–1986), New Zealand rugby union and rugby league footballer

== See also ==
- Bert Cooke (disambiguation)
- Albert Cook (disambiguation)
- Herbert Cook (disambiguation)
- Robert Cook (disambiguation)
- Bertie Cook, fictional character in Trial by Combat
