= The Manchester Deansgate Hotel =

Hotel in Manchester, England

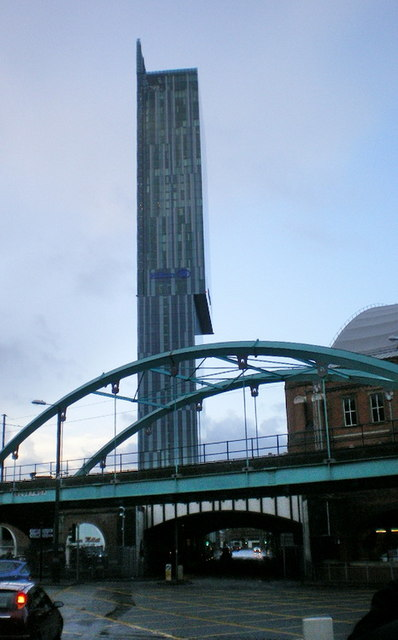
- Beetham Tower

- Location within Greater Manchester
- Hotel chain: IHG Hotels & Resorts

General information
- Type: Hotel
- Location: 303 Deansgate, Manchester, United Kingdom
- Coordinates: 53.475539°N 2.250713°W
- Owner: John Christodoulou

Other information
- Number of rooms: 279

Website
- Official website

The Manchester Deansgate Hotel is a hotel in Manchester city centre, England. The hotel is housed within the 169 m (554 ft) tall, 47-storey mixed-use Beetham Tower, also informally known as the Hilton Tower after the hotel's former operator.

From 2006 to 2018, the skyscraper was the tallest building in Greater Manchester and outside London in the United Kingdom. In November 2018, it was surpassed by the South Tower at Deansgate Square, which is 201 m (659 ft) tall.

== Occupancy ==
The four-star hotel occupies floors 1 to 22 and contains 279 bedrooms. The hotel has a four-storey annex, containing a swimming pool, ballroom, conference rooms and a coffee shop. It opened in 2006 as the Hilton Manchester Deansgate, operated by Hilton. IHG assumed operation in 2025 and the hotel was temporarily renamed The Manchester Deansgate Hotel on 18 August 2025. The hotel will be renovated and rebranded as an InterContinental hotel in 2027.

The 23rd floor has a 4 m (13 ft) cantilevered overhang with two glass windows in its floor, overlooking the ground from the skybar, Cloud 23. It ranks among the world's best bars but only has capacity for 250 people. The bar's most popular cocktail is Mr. Mercer's Cotton Peculiar. Invented by Lancashire chemist John Mercer (1791 1866), mercerisation, the treating of cotton with caustic soda to give it a smooth silken sheen, is a process still used today.

Ian Simpson, the architect of the building (described as "the UK's first proper skyscraper outside London"), bought the top two floors – the 48th and 49th.
