= Robert Coke =

Robert Coke may refer to:

- Robert Coke (Coventry MP) (1587–1653), MP for Coventry 1614–1621 and Fowey 1624
- Sir Robert Coke, 2nd Baronet (1645–1688), MP for Derbyshire
- Robert Coke (King's Lynn MP) (1651–1679), MP for King's Lynn 1675–1679
- Robert Coke (18th-century MP), Whig politician in Norfolk 1734
- Robert Coke (investor) (born 1972), British investor

== See also ==
- Robert Cooke (disambiguation)
- Robert Cook (disambiguation)
- Coke (disambiguation)
