= Beetham Tower, Manchester =

Mixed use skyscraper in Manchester, England

Coordinates: 53.47545°N 2.25025°W

Beetham Tower
- Hilton Tower
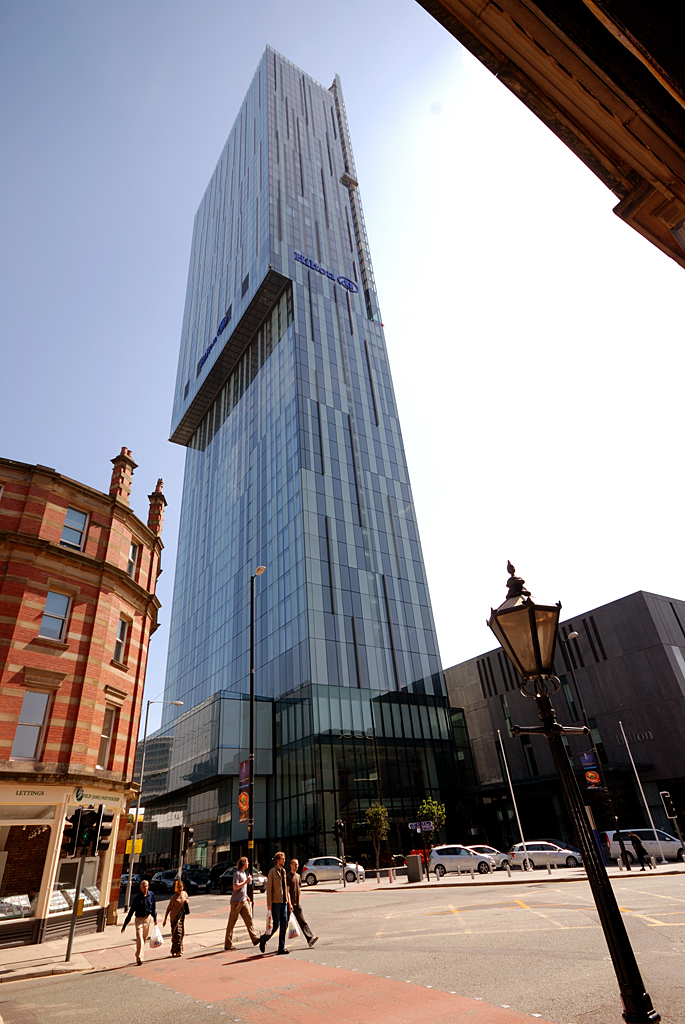

General information
- Status: Completed
- Type: Hotel, residential, office
- Architectural style: High-tech / Neomodern
- Location: 301–303 Deansgate, Manchester, England
- Construction started: 2004
- Completed: 2006
- Cost: £150 million
- Owner: John Christodoulou

Height
- Antenna spire: To glass façade overrun: 169 m (554 ft)
- Roof: 158 m (518 ft)

Technical details
- Floor count: 47
- Floor area: 45,100 square metres (485,000 sq ft)
- Lifts/elevators: 8

Design and construction
- Architect: SimpsonHaugh and Partners
- Developer: Beetham Organization
- Structural engineer: WSP Group
- Main contractor: Carillion
- Awards: CTBUH Best Tall Building Award 2007

Beetham Tower (also known as the Hilton Tower) is a 47-storey mixed use skyscraper in Manchester, England. Completed in 2006, it is named after its developers, the Beetham Organisation, and was designed by SimpsonHaugh and Partners. The development occupies a sliver of land at the top of Deansgate, hence its elongated plan, and was proposed in July 2003, with construction beginning a year later.

At a height of 169 m (554 ft), it was described by the Financial Times as "the UK's first proper skyscraper outside London". From 2006 to 2018, the skyscraper was the tallest building in Manchester and outside London in the United Kingdom. In November 2018, it was surpassed by the South Tower at Deansgate Square, which is 201 m (659 ft) tall.

As a result of the elongated floor plan, the structure is one of the thinnest skyscrapers in the world with a height to width ratio of 10:1 on the east–west façade, but is noticeably wider on the north–south façade. A 4 m (13 ft) cantilever marks the transition between hotel and residential use on the north façade, and a blade structure on the south side of the building acts as a façade overrun accentuating its slim form and doubles as a lightning rod. The skyscraper is visible from ten English counties on a clear day.

The top floor penthouse offers views of Greater Manchester, the Cheshire Plain, the Pennines and Snowdonia. The tower is known for emitting a loud unintentional hum or howl in windy weather, believed to emanate from the glass 'blade' atop the building. The hum has been recorded as a B below middle C and can be heard over large parts of the local area.

Architectural response to the skyscraper is polarised and interpretations vary. Some questioned its dominant appearance over the city, particularly over listed buildings, with one author going as far to say the skyscraper instantly "torpedoed" any possibility of Manchester becoming a UNESCO World Heritage City – a status for which Manchester had previously been shortlisted due to its industrial past. Others feel its dramatic appearance and peculiarity is reflective of Manchester, and that the Beetham Tower symbolises Manchester's reinvention as a post-industrial city, particularly since the bombing of 1996. Nevertheless, it has received praise and was awarded the best tall building in the world in 2007 by the Council for Tall Buildings and Urban Habitat. In 2019, it was the subject of a legal dispute over the need for urgent repair works to parts of the glass panel façade.

== History ==
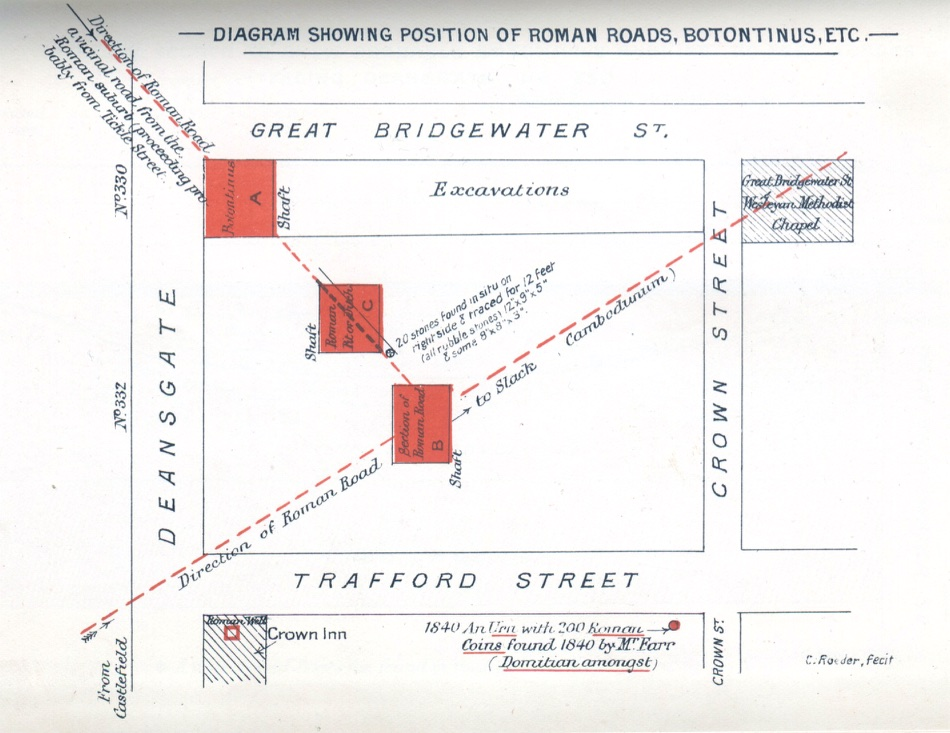
Roman roads intersecting at the site, as recorded in 1900

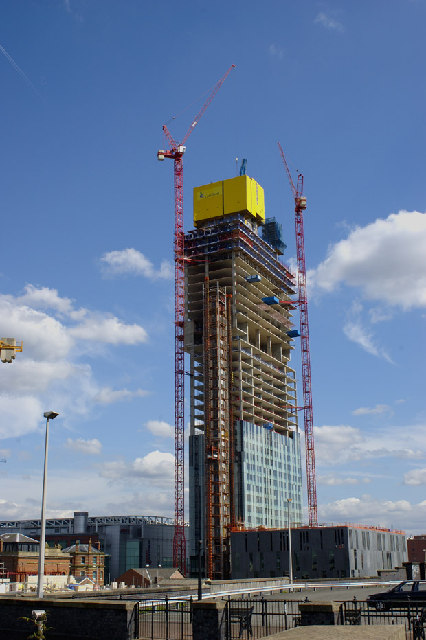
Beetham Tower under construction.

The site was next to a redundant section of railway viaduct, and was originally where two Roman roads intersected. With the support of English Heritage and the recommendation of the planning department, the Beetham Organisation submitted a planning application to Manchester City Council in July 2003. Planning permission was granted in October 2003.

The skyscraper was part of Manchester's regeneration, and by the end of 2003, before construction had started, 206 of its 219 flats, and four of its 16 penthouses had been pre sold. The skyscraper was built when much of the United Kingdom was experiencing an economic boom and high rise towers were being built in many English cities.

Ground and foundation works commenced at the beginning of 2004, and construction started in April 2004. By August 2004, work on its twin concrete cores had started and the structure was rising at a steady rate. One of the cores reached 122 m (400 ft) at the end of July 2005, at which point the building became the tallest skyscraper in the United Kingdom outside London. The tower was "topped out" on 26 April 2006. Local wind conditions dictated its height had to be reduced by about 2 m (6 ft 7 in) from the planned 171 m (561 ft). The hotel opened on 9 October 2006, and the first apartment residents moved in during 2007. The skyscraper cost £150 million to construct. In 2010, Braemar Estates, part of Braemar Group, were awarded a contract for management of the building. In 2018, Braemar Estates rebranded as Rendall & Rittner, taking the name of the managing agent which bought it out the year before.

== Architecture ==
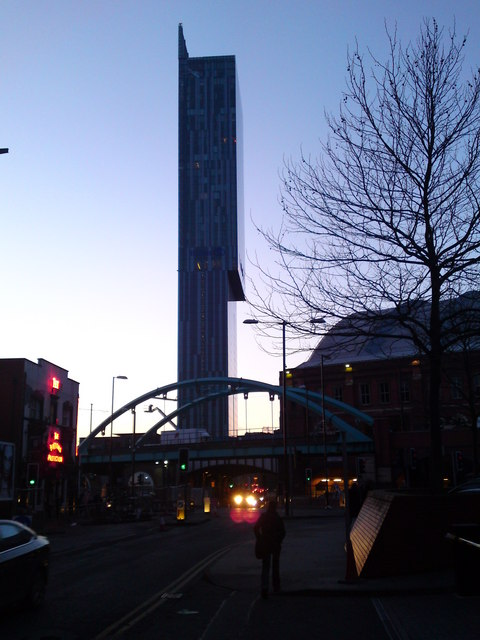
The Beetham Tower, one of the world's slimmest skyscrapers, has a width to height ratio of 1:10.

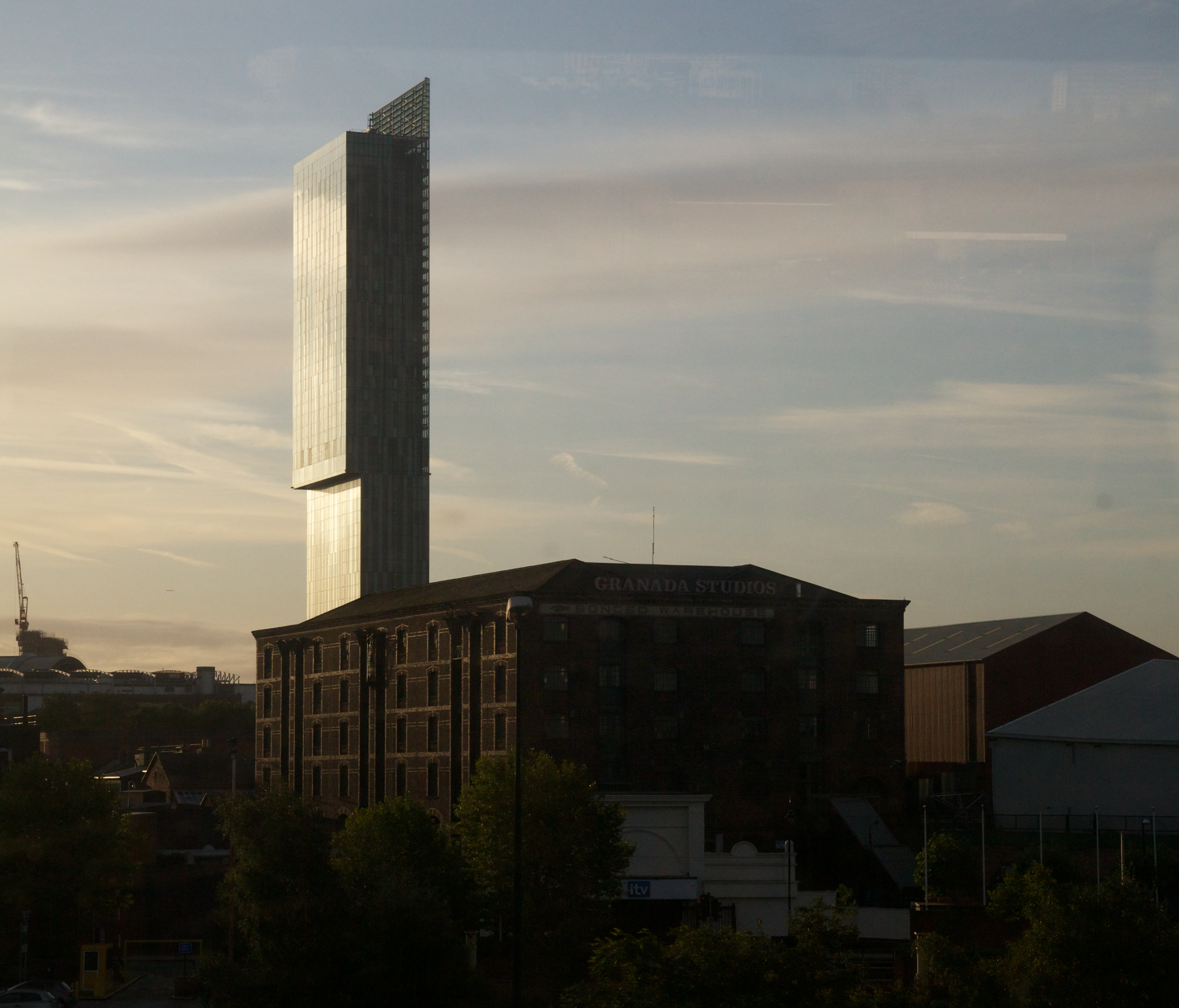
Reflective glazing and natural light is used to accentuate the tower's crystalline form throughout the course of the day.

The building stands on a narrow site on Deansgate at the junction with Great Bridgewater Street and Liverpool Road. Its tall rectangular form maximises the available space. On the 23rd storey a cantilever projects by 4 m (13 ft), increasing its floor space and giving the tower definition. On the roof is a glass overrun, described as a "glass blade" by the architect. The 10 m (33 ft) blade accentuates the flat south façade, contrasting with the north façade, and doubles as a lightning rod.

The tower was built by Carillion using post-tensioned flat slab concrete construction techniques and was the first structure in the United Kingdom to use the Doka SKE 100 automatic climbing system and trapezoidal windshield.

Piling foundations are typically preferred for skyscrapers; however, Manchester's sandstone substrata meant a raft foundation. The 2.5 m (8 ft 2 in) thick raft foundation sits 9 m (30 ft) below the ground level. Approximately 57,000 tonnes of concrete and 6,000 glass panes for the curtain-wall structure were required. Over 8,000m^{2} of rigid insulation board by Kingspan was used to reduce heat loss.

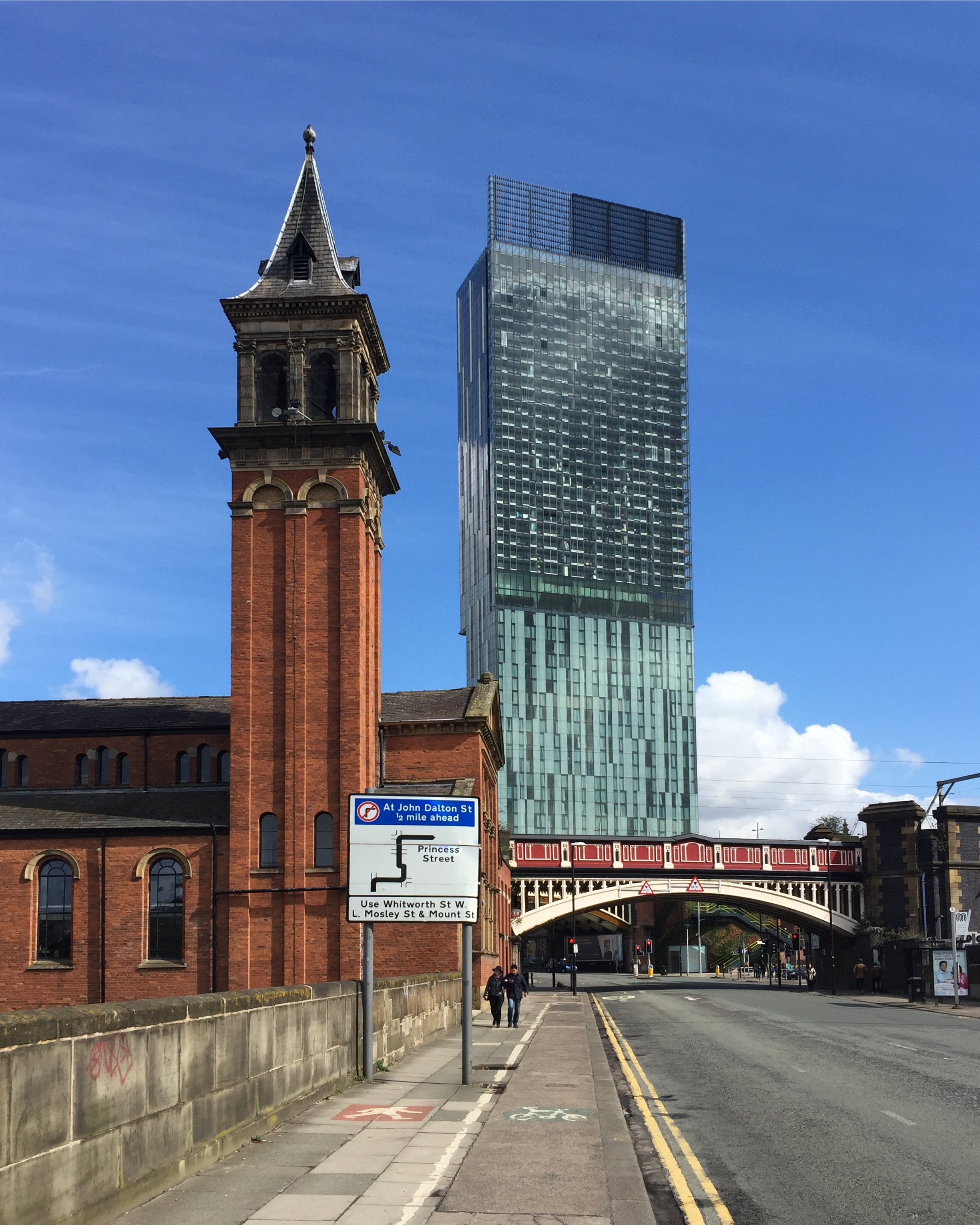
Beetham Tower's south facade seen from Bridgewater Viaduct.

The curtain-wall structure is clad in glass, and elements were added to counter excessive light. Louvres on south-facing windows allow for the control of daylight and sunlight into its interior. On the west- and east-facing sides, aluminium strips which are noticeable from ground level project outwards to provide shading from the sun.

The louvres on the south façade alter its consistency and appearance when some are open and others are closed. They stop excessive passive solar gain. Ultraviolet light hits the glass and is changed to infrared which generates heat through radiation, creating overheating.

The tower has 47 floors and is 169 metres in height, making it the tallest building in the United Kingdom outside London, and the tallest building in Manchester, until it was surpassed by Deansgate Square.

Floors 1 to 22 are occupied by the 279-bedroom four-star The Manchester Deansgate Hotel. The 23rd floor has a four-metre cantilevered overhang with two glass windows in its floor, overlooking the ground from the skybar, Cloud 23. The floor has a bar and lounge. Floors 25 to 47 are occupied by residential apartments.

A 12-storey office block is planned next to the tower, with 6,506 square metres of floor space. The hotel has a four-storey annexe, containing a swimming pool, ballroom, conference rooms and coffee shop.

== Occupancy ==
The architect, Ian Simpson, lives in the top floor penthouse, the highest residential space in Europe after surpassing Lauderdale Tower at the Barbican Estate in London upon opening in 2006. It cost £3 million and occupies the top two storeys. It has a semi-indoor garden containing 21 four-metre-tall olive, lemon and oak trees, originating from Italy and lifted into place with cranes through a small aperture in the roof before it was glazed in 2006.

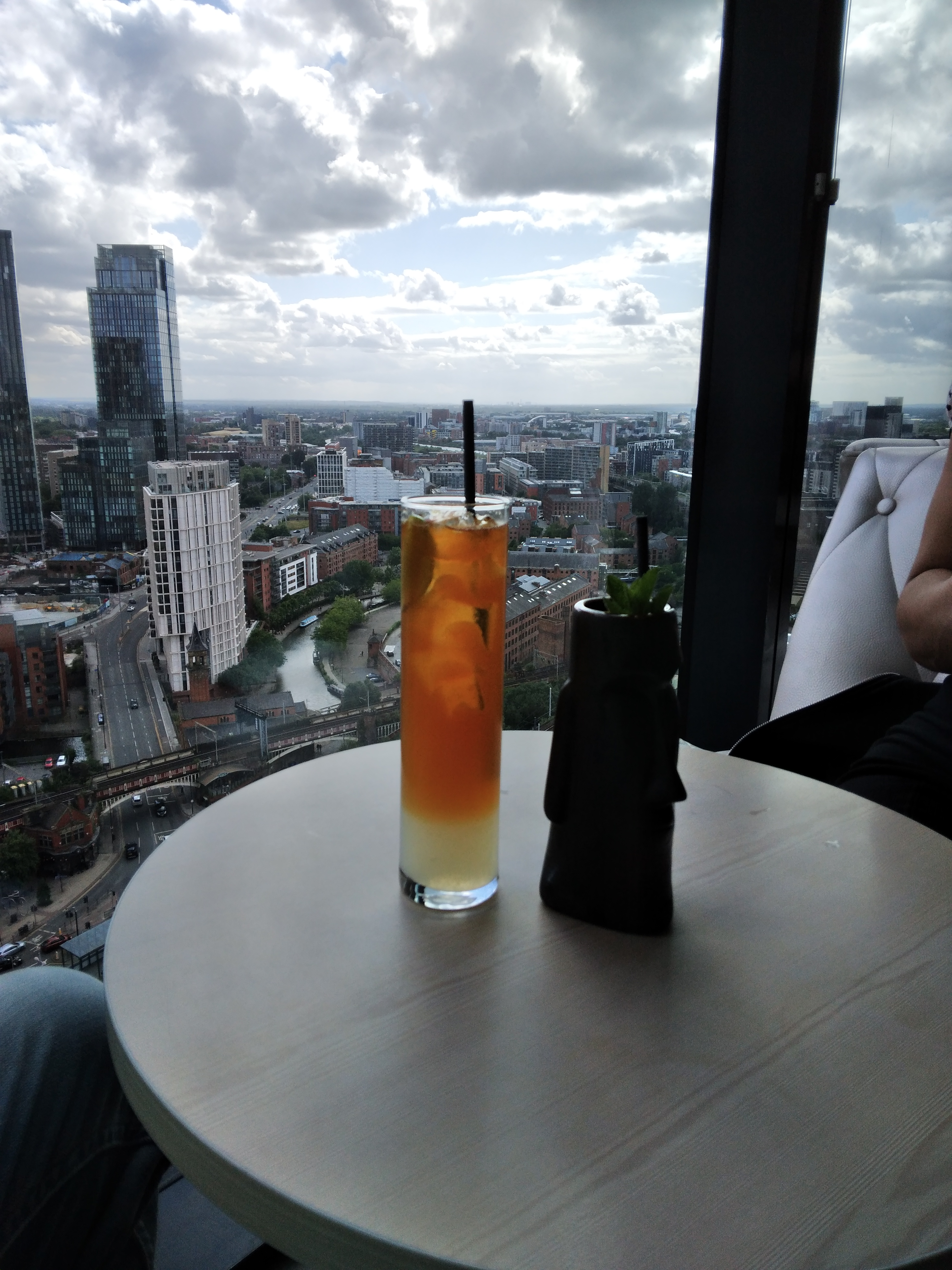
Cocktails at Cloud 23 on the 23rd floor of the tower, looking southwest over Castlefield

The Manchester Deansgate Hotel (formerly the Hilton Manchester Deansgate from 2006-2025) occupies space up to level 22, and a four-metre cantilever marks level 23 where the Cloud 23 bar is located. Above this level are apartments from level 25 to the triplex penthouse apartment on level 47.

Beetham claimed 90% of the residences were sold before construction began in 2004. The Daily Telegraph claimed that 55 of 219 apartments were waiting to be let, and a further thirty were unsold in September 2008. In September 2010, the Manchester rental market had improved, and only two apartments out of 219 were unoccupied awaiting interior fit-out.

Prices for an apartment ranged from £200,000 to £750,000 in 2011. In 2012 demand for apartments exceeded supply, causing bidding wars. In 2017, the second highest penthouse on floors 44, 45 and 46 was put up for sale at £3,500,000.

The tower has views over the set of Coronation Street from the north and west façade. The tower also has expansive vistas over Snowdonia, the South Pennines, the Peak District, the Cheshire Plain, Liverpool Cathedral Blackpool Tower, and Jodrell Bank Observatory on a clear day.

== Noise during high winds ==
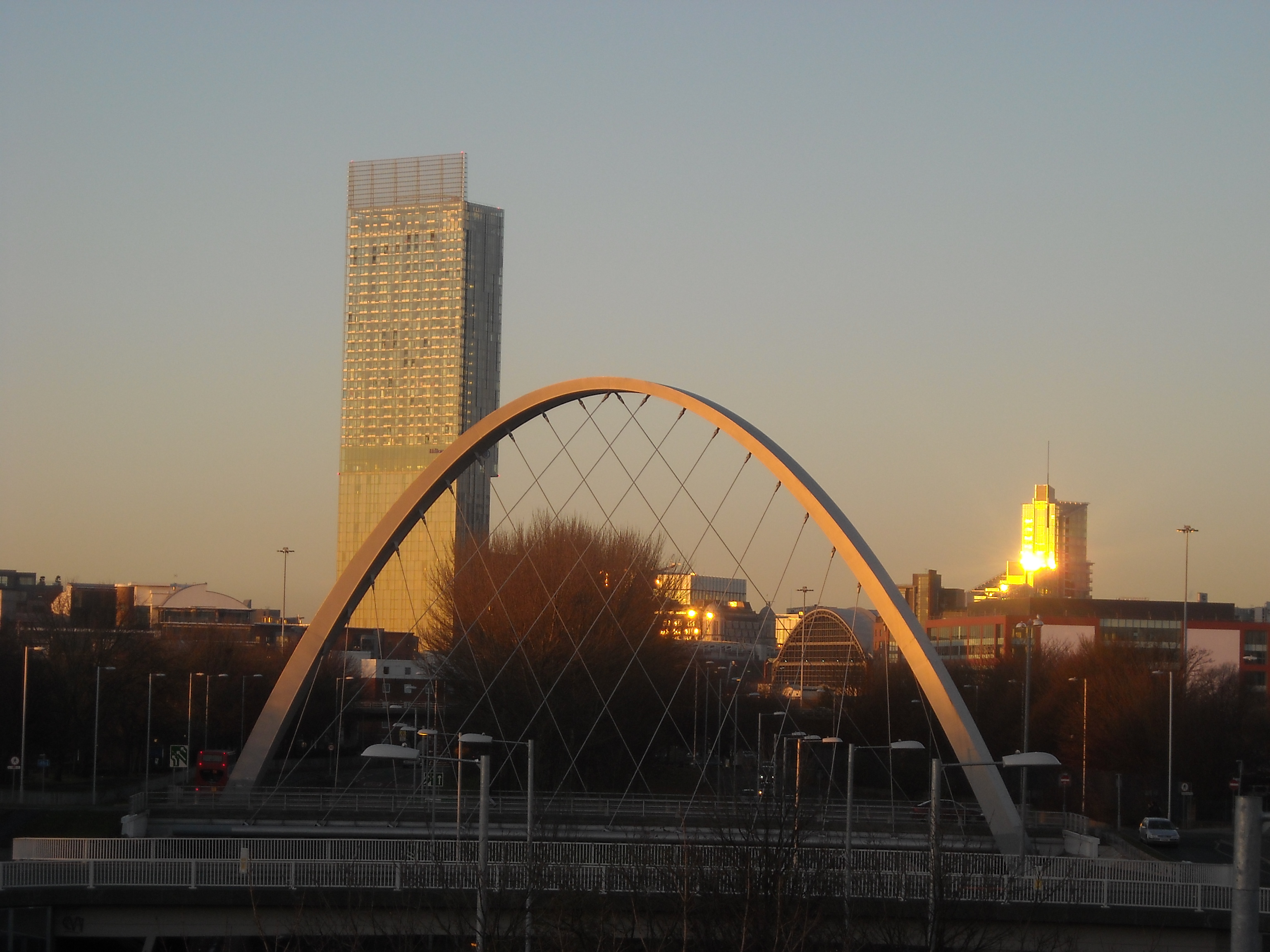
A humming noise emanating from the tower has been heard in Hulme. (Hulme Arch Bridge pictured in foreground)

The building has become known for an intermittent hum, or howling, which is heard in windy weather, emanating from the roof's glass blade, and first reported in May 2006 – just weeks after the tower opened. The skyscraper was intended to be 50 storeys high rather than 47, but wind load tests showed that it would sway too much because of its slender shape and the 'glass blade' façade overrun caused by the height reduction has been blamed for the noise.

The sound has been heard from about 300 metres away. It is close to the standard musical pitch of B3 (approximately 246.94 hertz) and has been compared to a "UFO landing". The noise affected production of Coronation Street. Work to reduce or eradicate the noise took place in 2006, 2007 and 2010. Foam pads were installed in 2006, aluminium nosing in 2007 and further work done in February 2010, but attempts to eradicate the noise permanently have been unsuccessful.

It was suggested that the decorative glass blade could be removed to solve the problem. The humming noise occurred again during Storm Doris in February 2017, during Storm Ciara in February 2020, during Storm Arwen in November 2021, and during Storm Franklin in February 2022. In January 2024, the noise could be heard once again during Storm Jocelyn.

== Incidents ==
On 11 September 2008, a pane of glass cracked, requiring the street below to be cordoned off. On 29 January 2009, a fire broke out on the 31st floor in Italian professional footballer Mario Balotelli's flat, and the tower was partially evacuated; one apartment was left uninhabitable.

On 14 February 2011, Beetham Hotels Manchester Ltd went into administration. Later in the year, the hotel was sold to Cypriot businessman Loucas Louca, bringing the hotel into the Yianis Group of companies owned by billionaire property developer John Christodoulou.

The site was the subject of a seven-year legal battle initiated by the Yianis Group hotel company, Blue Manchester Limited ('BML'). In summer 2021, the protracted dispute between the hotel company BML and the freeholder landlord North West Ground Rents Limited ('NWGR'), part of the publicly quoted Ground Rents Income Fund ('GRIF'), found a resolution with GRIF disposing of its interests in the building. This move came two years after a High Court ruled that NWGR, as building owner, must pay to change screw-stitch pressure plates on the glass panels for a more permanent and aesthetically pleasing solution to fix facade defects. Despite mandatory remedial works estimated to cost £8.9m and modest annual ground rent income of £33,250 from the apartments and £30,902 from the hotel, a buyer was found who acquired the building for a 'nominal' sum. Companies House records show that as of 2 August 2021, Deansgate Freehold Limited has Mr Yiannakis Theophani Christodoulou as the Person of Significant Control, making Yianis Group's John Christodoulou the beneficial owner of the entire building.

On 18 September 2023, with the development now under John Christodoulou ownership, a huge pane of glass from the hotel facade fell off the building as the temporary stitch plates failed while long awaited critical remedial works remained unfulfilled by the landlord.

== In popular culture ==
The Beetham Tower featured in television programmes Vertical City (2007) for More 4, Britain From Above for BBC One (2008) and Time Travel (2010) for the National Geographic Channel. It is depicted in the opening titles of numerous television programmes – including The Street, Coronation Street, the Manchester sequence of ITV Sport's England football coverage, and in an official BBC trailer for the 2021 Rugby League World Cup (in reference to Manchester being one of the host cities).

Scenes for Series 2 of Scott & Bailey were filmed in the reception area of the hotel, although the scenes were set in Bristol. AMC Cinemas can be seen in the outdoor shots.

American band Paramore used an audio sample from a video of the tower howling, throughout the track "Idle Worship" on their 2017 album After Laughter. In an interview with Zane Lowe for Beats 1, guitarist Taylor York admitted to finding out about Beetham Tower online and then went on to sample it in the song.

== See also ==
- No. 1 Deansgate, another glass residential building on the same road, also designed by Simpson Haugh
- Habitat Sky, a similar skyscraper in Barcelona

Records
Preceded by CIS Tower	Tallest Building in Manchester; 2006—2018; 169m	Succeeded by South Tower; Deansgate Square
Preceded by CIS Tower	Tallest Building outside London, UK; 2006—2018; 169m	Succeeded by South Tower; Deansgate Square
