= Bert Cooke (disambiguation) =

Bert Cooke was a British football manager.

Bert Cooke may also refer to:

- Bert Cooke (rugby)

== See also ==
- Bert Cook (disambiguation)
- Herbert Cooke (disambiguation)
- Robert Cooke (disambiguation)
