= Rob Cook =

Rob Cook may refer to:

- Rob Cook (politician) (born 1965), American
- Rob Cook (rugby union) (born 1984), English rugby union player

== See also ==
- Robert Cook (disambiguation)
