= 1 West India Quay =

Coordinates: 51°30′26″N 00°01′16″W

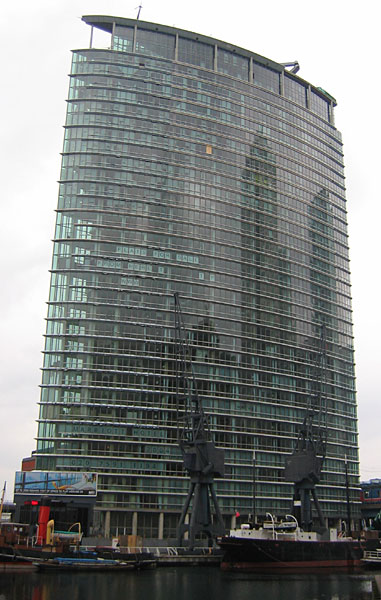
- Interactive map of the 1 West India Quay area

General information
- Status: Completed
- Architectural style: Postmodernism
- Location: London, E14; United Kingdom, 26 Hertsmere Road
- Construction started: 2002
- Completed: 2004

Technical details
- Floor count: 36

Design and construction
- Architect: HOK
- Developer: Manhattan Loft Corporation and MWB Group Holdings
- Main contractor: Multiplex

1 West India Quay is a landmark 33-storey mixed-use skyscraper situated just north of Canary Wharf business estate in east London. Completed in 2004, the development was built by Manhattan Loft Corporation and the now-defunct MWB Group Holdings. The distinctive glass- and aluminium-clad tower was designed by HOK. With its knife-edge profile and elegant curves, 1 West India Quay was one of the first post-tensioned, concrete-framed towers in London.

The building is 111 metres (364 feet) tall and has 33 floors (not including roof). The bottom 12 floors house a Marriott Hotel, including 47 serviced suites on floors 9–12. Floors 13-33 house 158 apartments. The tower overlooks West India Docks and the Canary Wharf estate.

== History ==
In 2001, planning permission was gained by Squire and Partners for a slender landmark mixed-use tower conceived to act as a visual counterpoint to the monumental brick form of the adjacent Victorian warehouses in London's Docklands. Designed by HOK, the building's elliptical form is reminiscent of the curved hull of a boat. The plans were part of the redevelopment of the area.

The concrete core reached full height on 11 April 2003. The official topping-out of the structure occurred on 24 September 2003, at which point 1 West India Quay became London's 21st tallest building.

While works had been expected to finish in May 2004, the skyscraper was not handed over until December. A report in The Times said that MWB Group Holdings and its partner Manhattan Loft Corporation had "fallen out" with contractor Multiplex over the delays. Multiplex had been "demanding more than £100m in extra payment from MWB, claiming delays were caused by the changes MWB sought", with MWB refusing to pay. The dispute was escalated to an independent arbitrator for adjudication.

According to contractor Multiplex, the post-tensioned 111 metre skyscraper actually "formed the tallest residential block in the UK at the time of construction". Developer Harry Handelsman, of Manhattan Loft Corporation, has also claimed that upon completion 1 West India Quay was "the largest high-rise building in London".

== On-screen appearances ==
In the film Run Fatboy Run, the character Whit owns an apartment in 1 West India Quay. Early on in the film, he is heard saying "West India Quay please!" to a taxi driver. Whit proposes to Libby, played by Thandie Newton, on the staircase of one of the penthouses with triple aspect floor-to-ceiling windows.

Whilst still a construction site, the building was used as a location in the film Layer Cake starring Daniel Craig.

Robert Carlyle's character in 28 Weeks Later escapes zombie apocalypse with his family by seeking refuge in the building.

Much of the music video "Heartbroken" by T2 (a London-based, garage music band) was filmed in or around 1 West India Quay.

The introduction of the show Richard Hammond's Invisible Worlds was filmed on the rooftop of 1 West India Quay, with Richard Hammond standing close to the building's signature arched top.

== See also ==
- List of tallest buildings and structures in London
