= Charlie Wright (Kent cricketer) =

English cricketer (1895–1959)

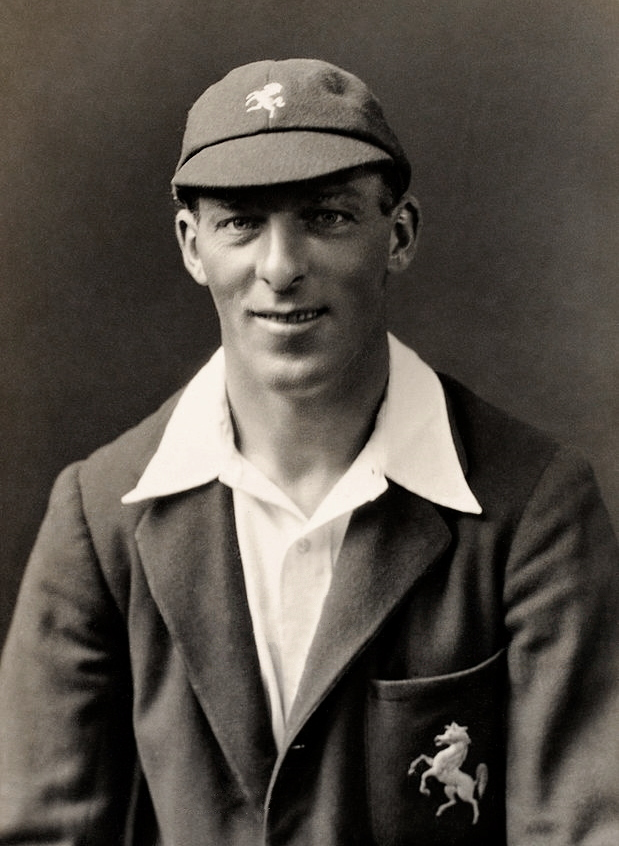
- Wright in c. 1929

Personal information
- Full name: Albert Charles Wright
- Born: 4 April 1895; Borstal, Kent, England
- Died: 26 May 1959 (aged 64); Westminster, Middlesex, England
- Batting: Right-handed
- Bowling: Right-arm fast-medium
- Role: Bowler

Domestic team information
- Years: Team
- 1921–1931: Kent

Career statistics
Competition	First-class
Matches	225
Runs scored	3,260
Batting average	13.09
100s/50s	0/9
Top score	81
Balls bowled	35,177
Wickets	596
Bowling average	24.26
5 wickets in innings	24
10 wickets in match	1
Best bowling	7/31
Catches/stumpings	127/–
- Source: CricketArchive, 25 December 2022

Albert Charles Wright (4 April 1895 – 26 May 1959) was an English cricketer who played first-class cricket for Kent in 225 matches between 1921 and 1931.

Wright was a professional right-arm fast-medium bowler and a right-handed lower-order batsman who frequently contributed useful runs. After a few matches in 1921 and 1922, he became a regular member of the Kent team in 1923 and remained a regular choice until the middle of the 1931 season, when he lost form and was dropped, not regaining his place in the team.

Wright and George Collins provided the seam bowling alternative to the spin of Tich Freeman and Frank Woolley which dominated Kent's bowling across the 1920s. Both his best batting and bowling performances came in the 1924 season, relatively early in his first-class career. Against Essex in June 1924 in the second innings he scored 81, putting on 157 in about 75 minutes for the eighth wicket with the debutant Alan Hilder, which stood as the Kent record for that wicket until 2007. In August of the same year, he took five Somerset wickets for 33 runs in the first innings and followed that with seven for 31 in the second innings, providing both his best innings and match figures. In 1925, in the match against Warwickshire, Wright was the first victim in a sequence of four wickets in five balls by the Warwickshire player Robert Cooke; in Warwickshire's second innings, Wright returned the favour with a hat-trick in which Cooke was one of his victims.

Wright's best seasons as a bowler were 1926 and 1927 and in both of these years he took more than 100 wickets at an average below 21 runs per wicket. His aggregates fell away from 1928 as Freeman came to dominate Kent's bowling almost single-handedly, and he was also more expensive from 1928 onwards. He remained a useful lower-order batsman, and passed 50 nine times in all, scoring more than 500 runs in both 1924 and 1929.
