= Herbert Cooke =

Herbert Cooke may refer to:

- J. Herbert Cooke, Australian politician
- Herbert Cooke (football manager)

== See also ==
- Bert Cooke (disambiguation)
- Herbert Cook (disambiguation)
