= Robert Barclay Cook =

British hotelier

Robert Barclay Cook (born 30 January 1966) is a British hotelier.

== Career ==
The son of a hotelier, Cook completed a three-year graduate trainee programme with Holiday Inn, before joining The Balmoral Hotel in Edinburgh. In 1997, he joined Ken McCulloch, boutique chain operator for the Malmaison Group as general manager of the newly acquired Newcastle site. Shortly after that, he became Operations Director for the group. In 2000, he left Malmaison to work with McCulloch on the Columbus Hotel in Monte Carlo, a project in conjunction with Formula One racing driver David Coulthard.

In 2004, Cook returned to Malmaison as chief executive officer. Marylebone Warwick Balfour, the group's owners, then purchased the Hotel du Vin collection of boutique hotels. Cook has been responsible ever since for the growth of both groups and the development of two distinct hotel brands.

Taking the "Hotels that dare to be different" mission statement from Malmaison, Cook as a director of Marylebone Warwick Balfour took the brand from three hotels to a mass of twelve hotels across the United Kingdom. Converting character buildings into boutique hotels, Cook was also responsible for the expansion of the Hotel du Vin brand to thirteen hotels, two Pub du Vins and a Bistro du Vin to be opened in Clerkenwell, London. The two branches of Bistro du Vin in Clerkenwell and Soho did not perform as well as hoped, recording a loss of £330,000 in the 18-month period to June 2011. The brand ceased trading in May 2011. - which was not one of Cook's finest moments.

In January 2012, Cook was appointed CEO of Village Hotels; after an intensive re-brand he went live to the press in May 2012 announcing their rename to "Village Urban Resorts". Subsequently, in June 2102, Cook was also appointed CEO of De Vere Hotels, charged with invigorating the De Vere brand across its estate of ten golf resorts. In April 2014, Cook stepped down as Chief Executive of De Vere, as the company moved to streamline its management structure, following the sale of one of its sister brands.

In May 2015, Cook joined Macdonald Hotels & Resorts.

In June 2016, Cook left his role as chief operating officer of Macdonald Hotels & Resorts after just over 1 year after he took up an official post in the business; having now been appointed as UK managing director of Virgin Active.

== Property ==
Conversion of various properties into restaurants and hotels has been a feature of Cook's work.

This includes

- Oxford Prison into Malmaison Oxford. This former prison features original cell rooms and showcase atrium design. Other unusual conversions inspired by Cook's foresight are:
- Hotel du Vin Edinburgh – a former mental asylum
- Malmaison Aberdeen – the former Queens Hotel
- Hotel du Vin – the former Mansion House Hotel
- Hotel du Vin Newcastle – the former CWS (Cooperative Wholesale Society) warehouse on Newcastle's Quayside.

== Staff ==
Cook spearheaded training programmes and reward schemes for employees, working with human resource specialists Learn Purple. Believing it more important to develop and promote from within, he opened and staffed Hotel du Vin Newcastle with graduates and internal promotions as his main criteria. It was a hotel where key positions were filled with the group's own homegrown talent.

== Achievements and accolades ==
- He holds an Honorary Doctorate for his contribution to the industry from Robert Gordon University in Aberdeen
- Manager of the Year – Hotel & Caterer Cateys Awards 2006
