= Canary Riverside Plaza =

Hotel in London, England

Canary Riverside Plaza Hotel
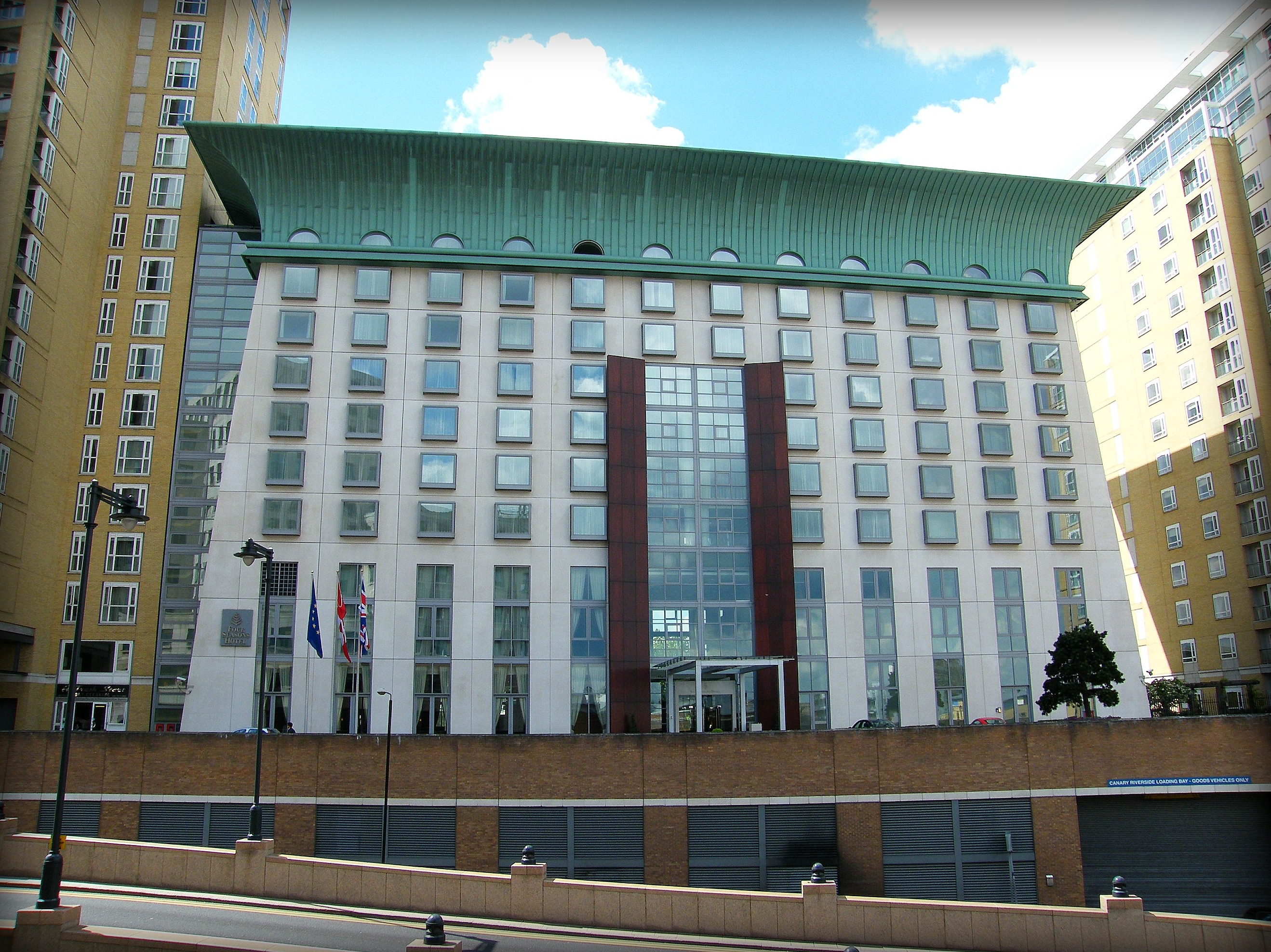

- Location within London Borough of Tower Hamlets

General information
- Location: 46 Westferry Circus, Canary Wharf, London, England, United Kingdom
- Coordinates: 51°30′22″N 0°1′41″W
- Owner: John Christodoulou

Other information
- Number of rooms: 142

Website
- www.canaryriversideplaza.com/en

Canary Riverside Plaza Hotel is a luxury 5-star hotel in London, England. It is located at 46 Westferry Circus in Canary Wharf. The hotel has 142 rooms and suites containing large bay windows overlooking the River Thames. Its Ancient Egyptian inspired design by Renton, Howard, Wood & Levin, based on earlier work by Philippe Starck, features a curved patinated copper roof. This bold architecture was seen as a departure from the previous conservatism of the Four Seasons group, who built it as Four Seasons Hotel London at Canary Wharf.

It is owned by the Monaco-based billionaire property developer John Christodoulou.

The mixed-use site has been the subject of much litigation and controversy between the landlord and leaseholders. In 2016, the residential leaseholders won the right to have a court appointed manager installed due to a lack of financial transparency, extortionate service charges and a failure to maintain the estate by landlord Yianis Group. Over 100 of the residents were threatened with defamation for appealing to judges for the removal of the landlord with a section 24 manager. However, Christodoulou began to "chip away at the manager’s powers, costing leaseholders £1m in legal fees in 22 proceedings", eventually forcing the first court appointee to quit on health grounds.
