= Alan Hilder =

English cricketer

Personal information
- Full name: Alan Lake Hilder
- Born: 8 October 1901; Beckenham, Kent
- Died: 2 May 1970 (aged 68); St Leonards-on-Sea, Hastings, East Sussex
- Batting: Right-handed

Domestic team information
- Years: Team
- 1924–1929: Kent
- FC debut: 25 June 1924 Kent v Essex
- Last FC: 3 May 1930 Marylebone Cricket Club (MCC) v Yorkshire

Career statistics
Competition	First-class
Matches	21
Runs scored	451
Batting average	14.54
100s/50s	1/0
Top score	103*
Balls bowled	1,056
Wickets	13
Bowling average	41.23
5 wickets in innings	0
10 wickets in match	0
Best bowling	3/77
Catches/stumpings	12/–
- Source: ESPNcricinfo, 5 November 2017

Alan Lake Hilder (8 October 1901 – 2 May 1970) was an English amateur cricketer who played first-class cricket between 1924 and 1930. He played primarily for Kent County Cricket Club. He was born in Beckenham, then part of Kent, in 1901.

Hilder was educated at Cottesmore School and Lancing College. He played cricket for both, heading the batting averages for Lancing in 1920, and played for Kent's Second XI later the same year for the first time.

He made his first-class cricket debut for Kent in June 1924 against Essex at Gravesend. He scored a century in Kent's second innings of the match and set a Kent record for the 8th wicket in first-class cricket which stood until 2007, scoring 157 runs in partnership with Charlie Wright. This was Hilder's only century of his career and he was considered to have "never afterwards approached that form". He played 14 times for Kent, his final match coming in 1929.

Hilder toured Jamaica in 1926/27 and 1927/28 with teams led by Lionel Tennyson, playing eight first-class matches, and in 1928/29 in a minor team led by Julien Cahn. He played his final first-class match in 1930, his only one for Marylebone Cricket Club (MCC), but continued to play cricket for various amateur teams until after World War II, including touring Egypt in 1932 in a team led by Hubert Martineau.

He died at St Leonards-on-Sea in Hastings, East Sussex in 1970 aged 68.

== Bibliography ==
- Carlaw, Derek (2020). Kent County Cricketers, A to Z: Part One (1806–1914) (PDF). Cardiff: ACS.
