= Albert Cooke =

Albert Cooke may refer to:

- Bert Cooke (rugby) (1901–1977), New Zealand dual-code rugby player
- Albert Cooke (footballer) (1908–1988), English footballer
