= Rent Repayment Order =

A Rent Repayment Order (RRO) is an order in the United Kingdom that allows a tenant or local authority to reclaim rent or housing benefit where a landlord rents out an unlicensed property such as a House in multiple occupation (HMO).

Rent Repayment Orders are not obtained through the court's system but through a Residential Property Tribunal. Housing academic David Cowan writing in Housing Law and Policy cites the case Newham London Borough Council v Ring to demonstrate that a local authority can use a rent repayment order to reclaim housing benefit. Local authorities can only apply for a Rent Repayment Order where occupiers pay their rent with the assistance of housing benefit or the housing element of Universal Credit.

The Housing and Planning Act 2016 changed when Rent Repayment Orders can be granted to include the following situations:

- Breaches of improvement orders and prohibition notices and of licensing requirements under the Housing Act 2004.
- Violent entry under the Criminal Law Act 1977.
- Unlawful eviction under the Protection from Eviction Act 1977.
- Breach of Banning Orders (new in this Act).

In addition, tenants under the new Act can apply for an RRO directly without the need for a prior conviction of the landlord through prosecution by a Local Authority (LA). LAs have (prior to the 2016 Act) prosecuted on average only one landlord per year for such offences. LAs have the power to impose unlimited fines or bring criminal charges. Fines for the above offences may be kept by the LA to fund enforcement in these areas.

There has been considerable variation in the awards received by tenants making RRO applications under the 2016 Housing and Planning Act and there is some discussion regarding the use of guidance given by the Upper Tribunal under the 2004 Housing Act for making judgments under the new Act.

A discussion of recent actual cases of tenant-instigated RRO applications, for the London area, can be found here.

Recent articles suggest RROs are becoming a powerful tool for tenants to gain redress for sub-standard accommodation.

== Renters' Rights Bill (RRB) and RROs ==
The Renters' Rights Bill (RRB) plans to make significant changes to the use and power of RROs. The most significant changes are as follows:

- RROs can be for TWO YEARS’ rent (doubled)
- Tenants have TWO YEARS in which to make an application (doubled)
- SUPERIOR landlords are liable for RRO applications
- Officers of LIMITED COMPANY landlords may be personally liable for RRO applications
- Repeat RRO offenders face 100% awards

The inclusion of superior landlords as potential Respondents to a RRO is one of the most significant changes and aims to stop the use of "Rent-to-Rent" (R2R) companies to protect rogue landlords.

== Help for applicants: how to use RROs ==
A number of local authorities have published guides to assist tenants making RROs however some of these contain significant errors (e.g. Camden & Bristol). The most comprehensive guide is that provided by Flat Justice, a not-for-profit Community Interest Company on their website at https://www.GetRentBack.org. It is continually updated as legislation and case law develops and offers templates and tips to help tenants/licensees making their own RRO applications without assistance from a lawyer.

Case Law

Taylor v Mina An Ltd (2019)

The Upper Tribunal (Lands Chamber) (UT) has overturned a decision of the FtT which would have allowed the licence of sold property to continue in force under the new owner, even though the HA 2004 clearly states that a licence is not transferable. Had the decision stood, then RROs for such properties would not have been possible.

Sharma & Subramani v Chun Kwok Lau (2019)

This case, reviewed on appeal at FtT, confirms that you can make your application within 12 months of the offence and that the rent you can apply for is not reduced by any delay (see RRO1 form correction above). Additionally, you do not need to specify the exact period of rent that you apply for.

Goldsbrough & Swart v CA Property Management Ltd. (2019)

Applicants can choose who is their landlord/Respondent in cases where there is ambiguity, e.g. Rent-to-Rent schemes

Guardians can Get Rent Back A recent decision of The London Property Tribunal found that guardians were able to use Rent Repayment Order (RRO) legislation to apply for their rent to be repaid when the property was not licensed as a House of Multiple Occupation (HMO).

Opara v Olasemo (2020)

Refinement of the definition of "Beyond Reasonable Doubt". This is the "criminal" level of evidence required to assure the possibility of an RRO award by the FtT and this appeal challenged the finding that any doubt at all meant that an application must fail. The UT found that the FtT had been "irrational" in its conclusion that the existence of any possibility of any doubt prohibited an RRO.

Mohamed & Lahrie v Waltham Forest (2020)

Licensing of property is a "strict liability offence": it's no excuse for a landlord to claim they were unaware of the requirement to license

Vadamalayan v Stewart & ORS (2020)

The landmark case that largely sets aside Parker v Waller (2012) and assumes that RRO awards should be 100% of rent paid, adjusted only by s44(4)
