= Deansgate Square =

Skyscraper cluster in Manchester, England

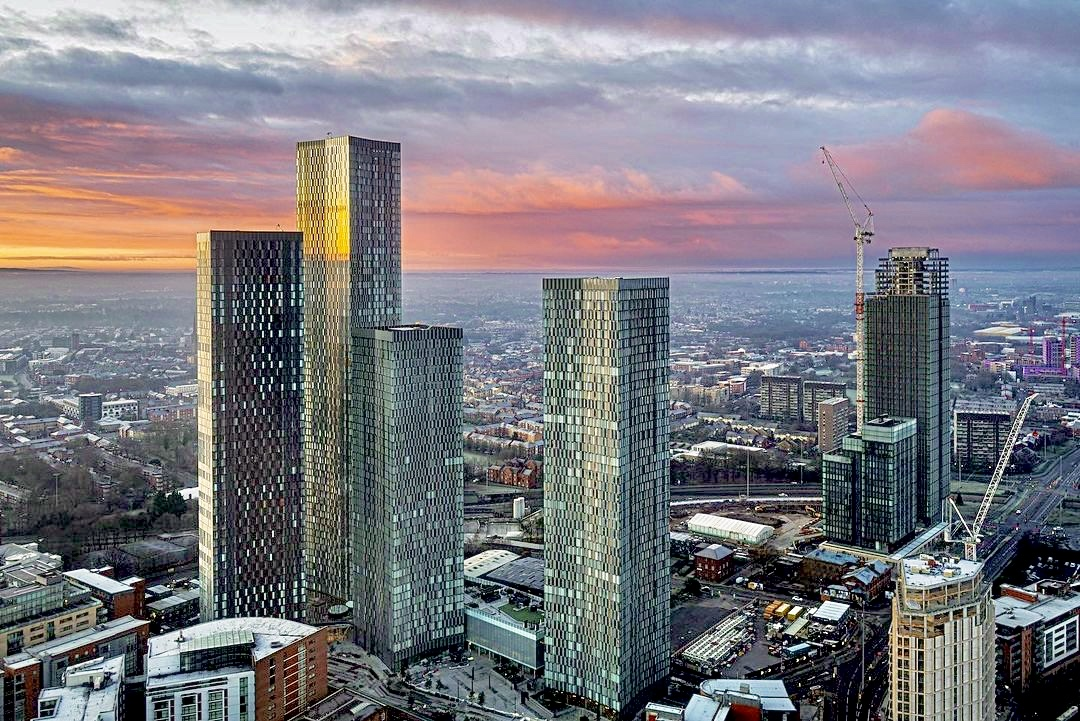
- The Deansgate Square skyscraper cluster, winter 2020

- Location within Greater Manchester
- Former names: Owen Street

General information
- Type: Residential
- Location: Owen Street, Manchester, England
- Coordinates: 53.473°N 2.253°W
- Construction started: West and South Towers: July 2016; North and East Towers: October 2017
- Topped-out: May 2018 (West Tower), November 2018 (South Tower), August 2019 (North and East Towers)
- Completed: South and West: 2019; North and East: 2020
- Cost: Undisclosed (estimated to be in excess of £385 million)
- Owner: Renaker (South and East Towers); Legal & General (West and North Towers)
- Management: East Tower Bricks N Blocks PLC

Height
- Roof: South: 201 m (659 ft); East: 158 m (518 ft); West: 141 m (463 ft); North: 122 m (400 ft)

Technical details
- Floor count: South: 64; East: 50; West: 44; North: 37
- Floor area: 183,000 m^{2} (1,970,000 sq ft)

Design and construction
- Architects: SimpsonHaugh and Partners; Landscape: TPM
- Developer: Renaker
- Structural engineer: DP Squared
- Main contractor: Renaker Build

Other information
- Number of units: 1,508

Website
- deansgatesquare.com

Deansgate Square, formerly known as Owen Street, is a residential skyscraper cluster on the southern edge of Manchester city centre, England. It consists of four towers, the tallest of which is 201 metres (659 ft). The site lies just south of Deansgate railway station and north of the Mancunian Way, bounded by Deansgate, Owen Street and the River Medlock. The towers are positioned at different angles to one other, with a slight bevel, or 'cut back', on each side of each building to ensure they catch the light at different times of day.

Manchester City Council adopted a framework in the early 2000s, known as the Great Jackson Street Development Framework, which earmarked the site as a suitable location for high-rise buildings. The framework was introduced to encourage development, as the site had been vacant for many years and was perceived as isolated due to being bounded by major arterial roads.

In 2016 the scheme was revived with a planning application for a cluster of four skyscrapers—the tallest being the South Tower at 201 m (659 ft). The South Tower surpassed the 169 m (554 ft) Beetham Tower as the tallest building in Greater Manchester in November 2018.

Construction on the tower complex officially began in July 2016, with developer Renaker starting work on the South and West Towers, the latter standing 141 m (463 ft). In October 2017, construction commenced on the North and East Towers, which are 122 m (400 ft) and 158 m (518 ft), respectively. The overall development was completed in late 2020. Other towers in the adjacent vicinity, also built as part of the Great Jackson Street Development Framework, include Elizabeth Tower (2022), The Blade (2023), Three60 (2024), and Contour (2026).

== History ==
=== 2007 original scheme ===
The 2007 scheme consisted of five high-rise buildings containing nearly 1,100 residential units, 100 serviced apartments, a hotel, parking, office and retail space, and community facilities. The tallest skyscraper planned was "Block D", which would have consisted of 49 storeys — two storeys more than Manchester's tallest building, Beetham Tower — and 150 m (490 ft).

A planning application was submitted to Manchester City Council in 2007 and was approved early in 2008. Permission to extend the time limit for building on the site was sought from the council in early 2011, a request which was granted in September 2011.

=== 2016 revived scheme ===
The revised scheme, proposed by developers Renaker Build and designed by SimpsonHaugh and Partners, was made public in January 2016 with a planning application to seek permission for the construction of four skyscrapers submitted in April.

The proposed towers range from 122 m (400 ft) to over 200 m (660 ft) – the South Tower is 64 floors and 200.5 m (658 ft), the East Tower is 50 floors and 157.9 m (518 ft), the West Tower is 44 floors and 140.4 m (461 ft) and the North Tower is 37 floors and 122 m (400 ft).

The scheme was approved by Manchester City Council on 30 June 2016.

=== Construction ===
Construction on the tower complex officially began in July 2016, with developer Renaker starting construction on the South and West Towers. Piling works on the West Tower were complete by November 2016, with tower cranes erected soon after. Both towers would continue to rise for another two years before "topping out" in mid-2018.

By October 2017, as both the South and West Towers continued to rise, construction on the foundation and podium for the North and East Towers commenced. By July 2018, the West Tower topped out, having reached the 45th floor - its highest floor level. By November 2018, the South Tower – the tallest tower of the approved scheme at 201 metres (659 ft) – had topped out, having reached the 65th floor, its highest floor level.

In August 2018, institutional investor Legal & General acquired the West Tower with the intention to rent the tower out once complete. Although the deal for the West tower was undisclosed, its estimated real estate value was believed to be in the region of £200 million, according to Estates Gazette.

In January 2020, Legal & General announced the exchange of contracts for the Built to Rent North Tower. The North Tower represents Legal & General's second Built to Rent acquisition in Deansgate Square.

October 2020 saw the final completion of the North, South, East, and West Towers.

== Gallery ==
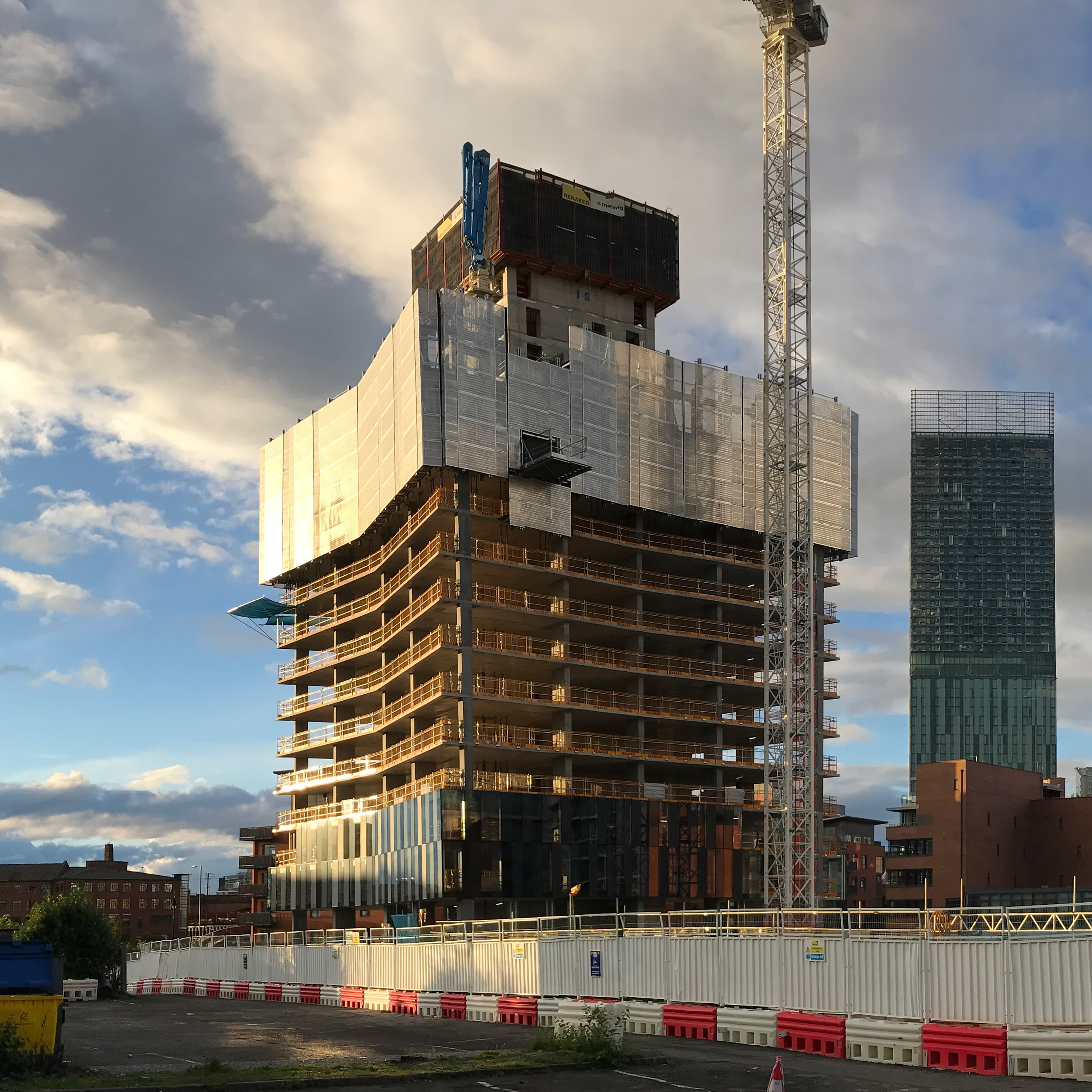
West Tower, core up to level 16 of 44, July 2017

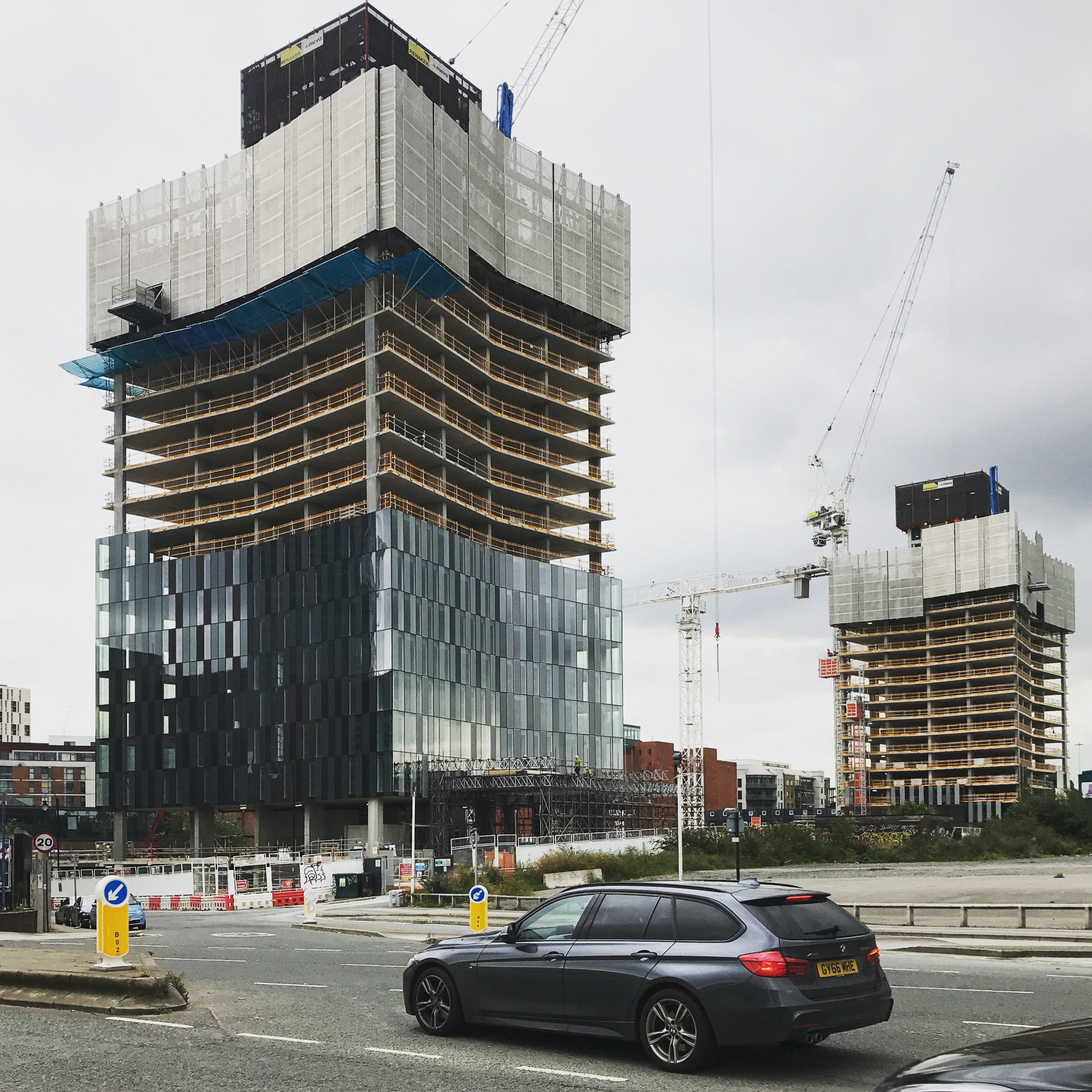
West Tower with seven floors fully glazed, September 2017

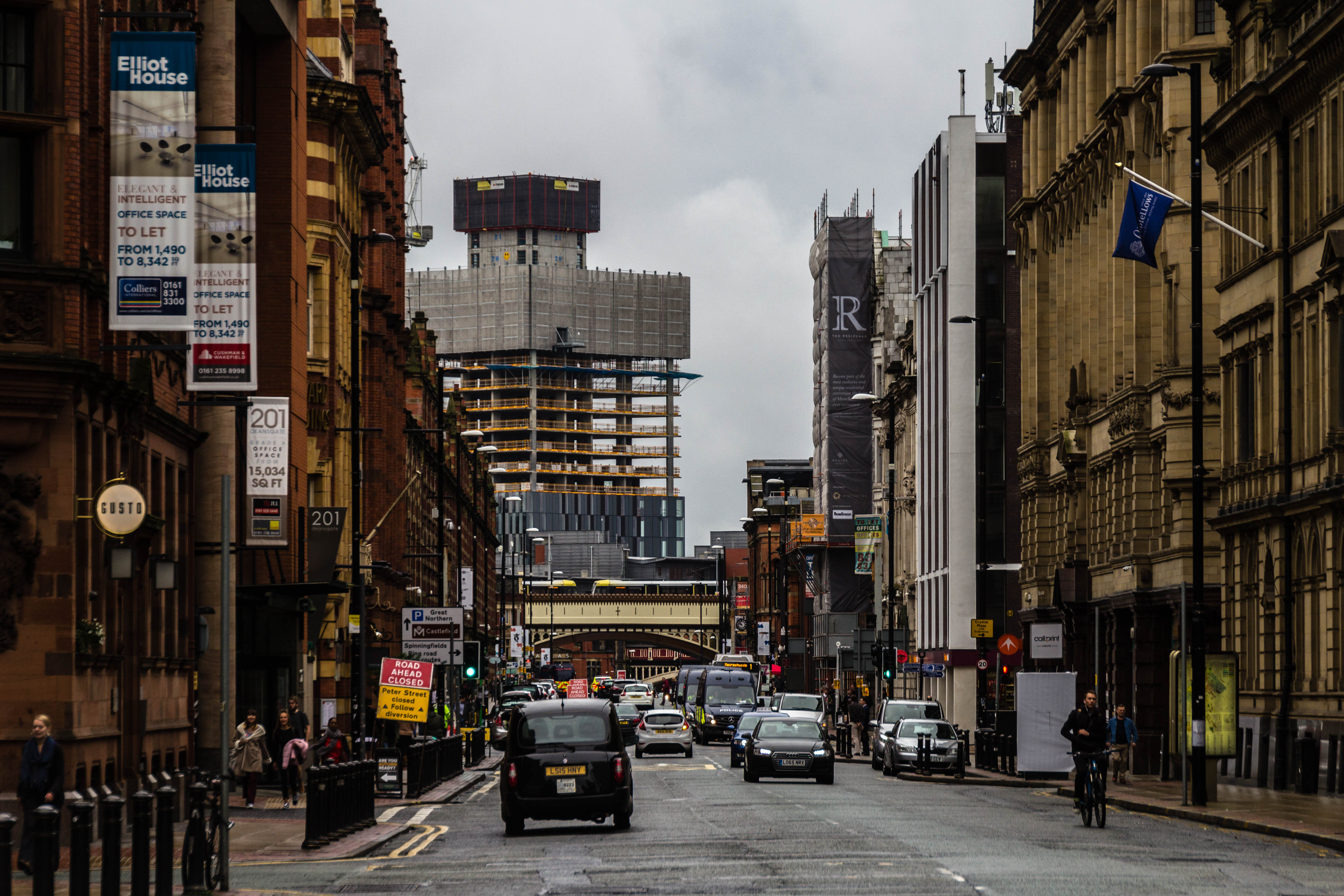
The West Tower under construction, visible at the end of Deansgate, October 2017

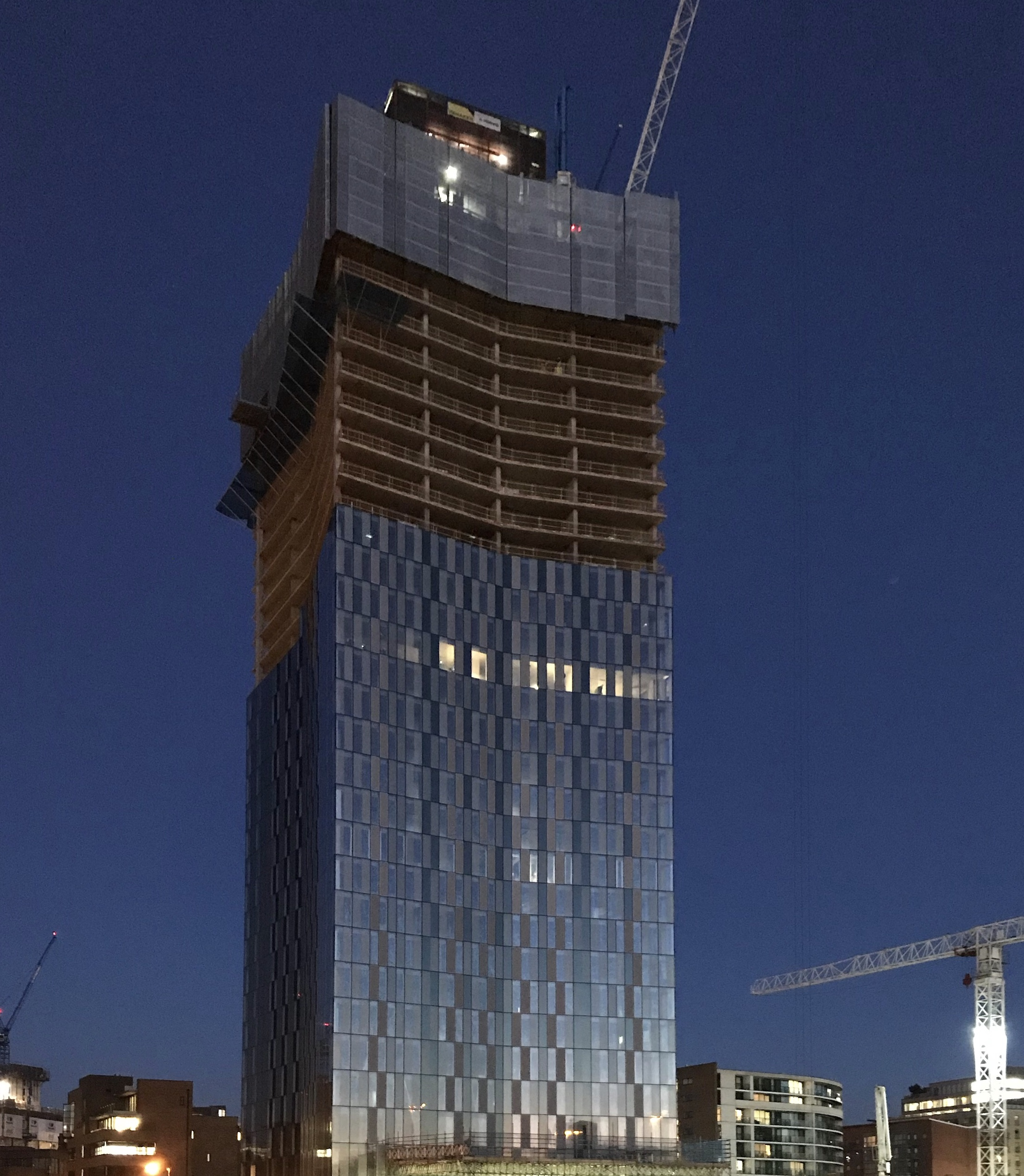
West Tower at night, December 2017

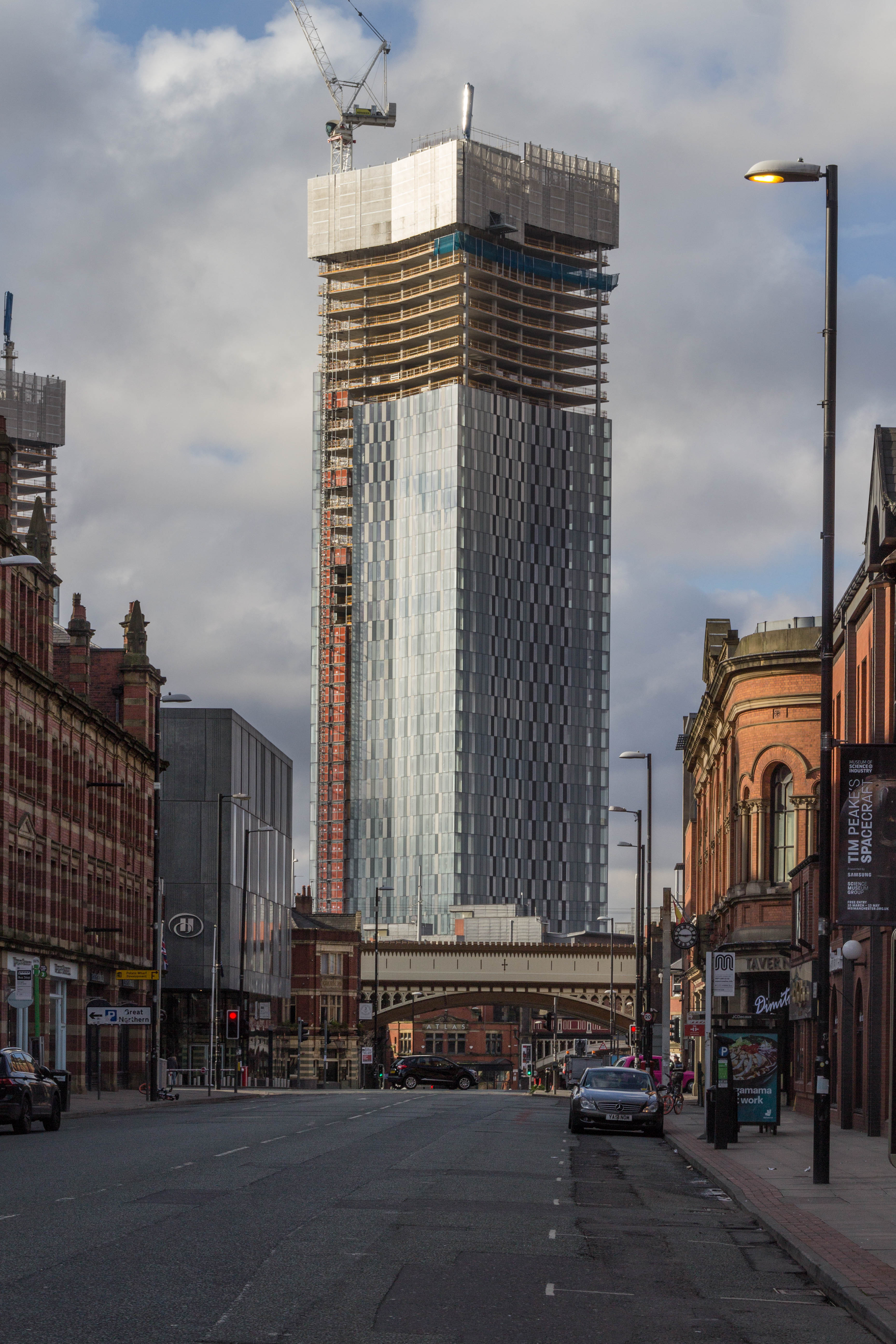
West Tower, April 2018

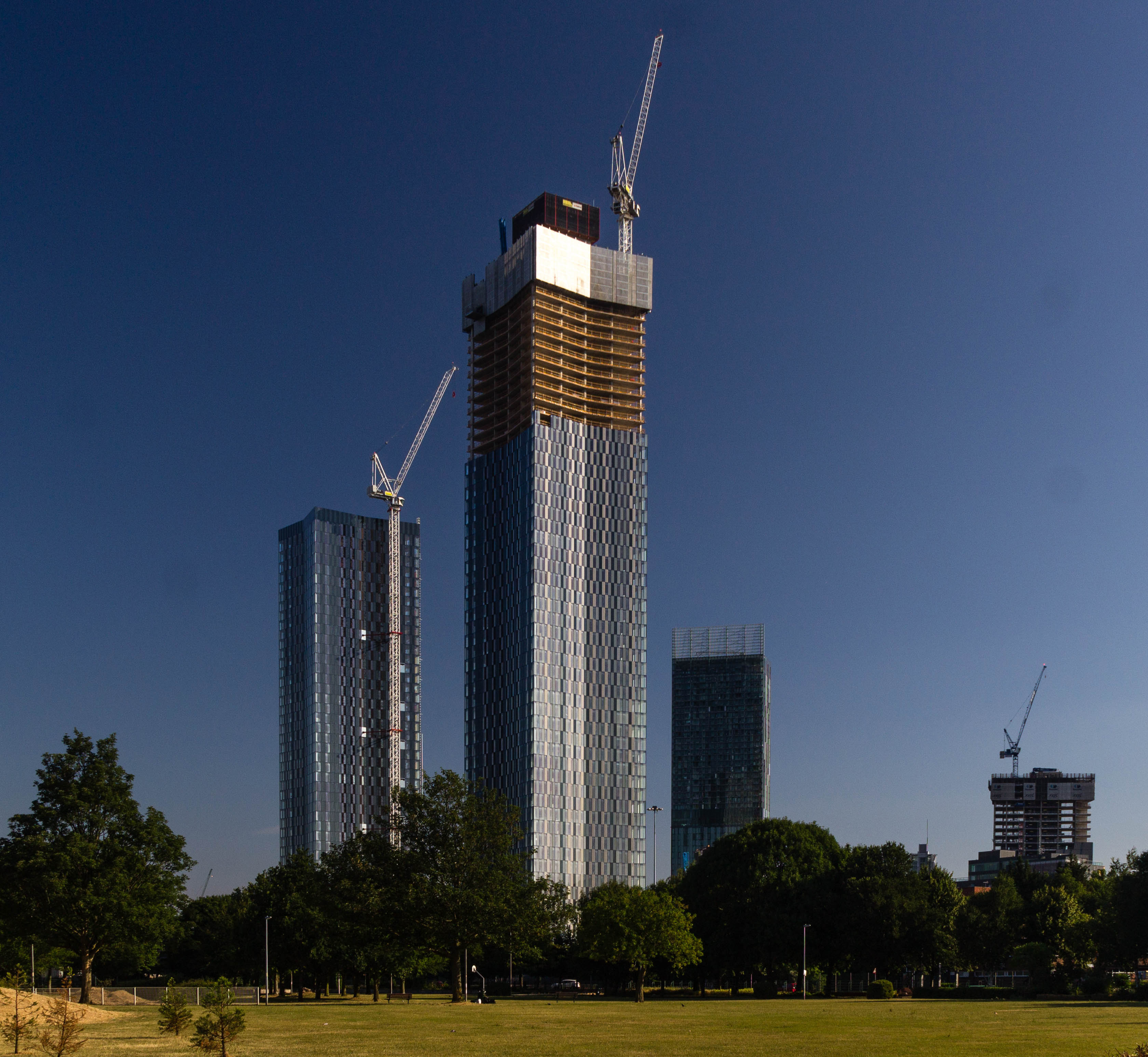
Deansgate Square under construction in 2018

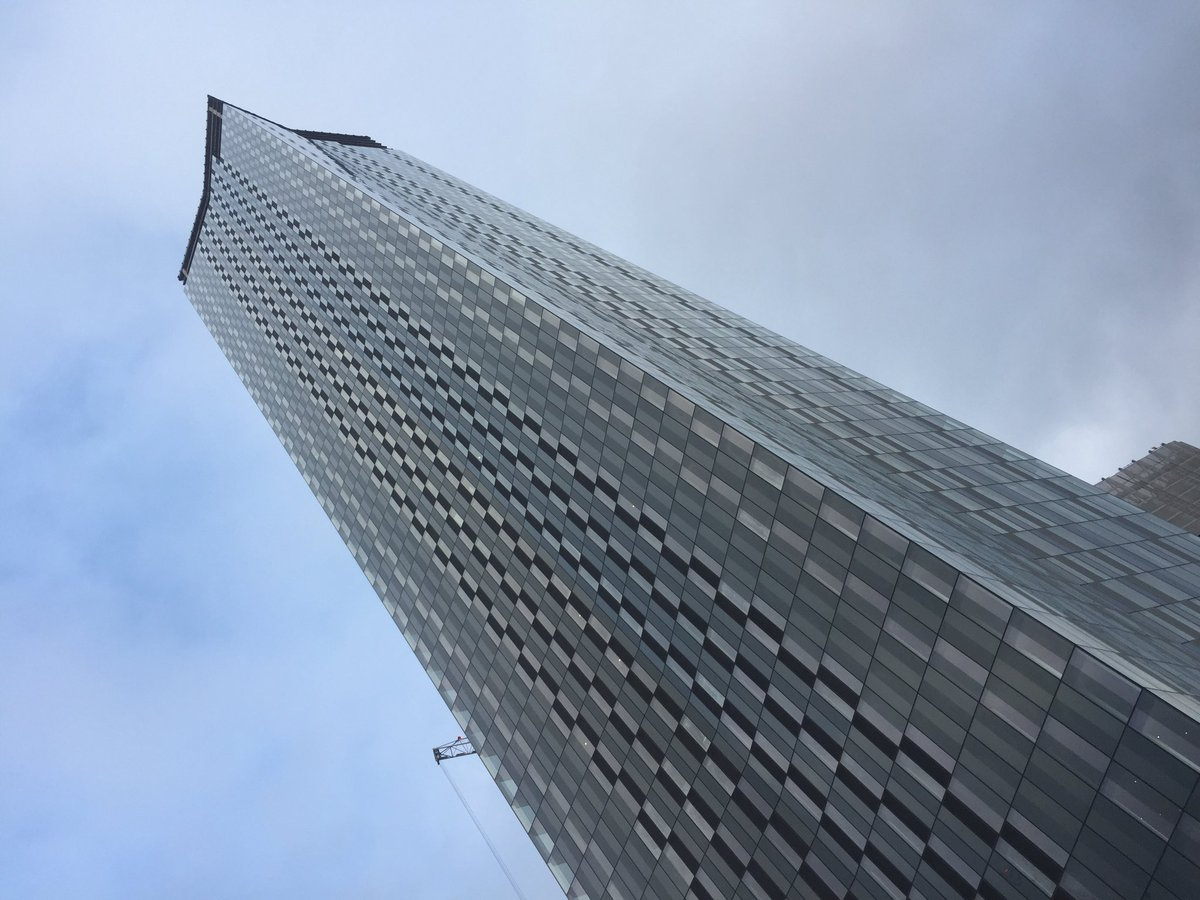
Deansgate Square, completed November 2018

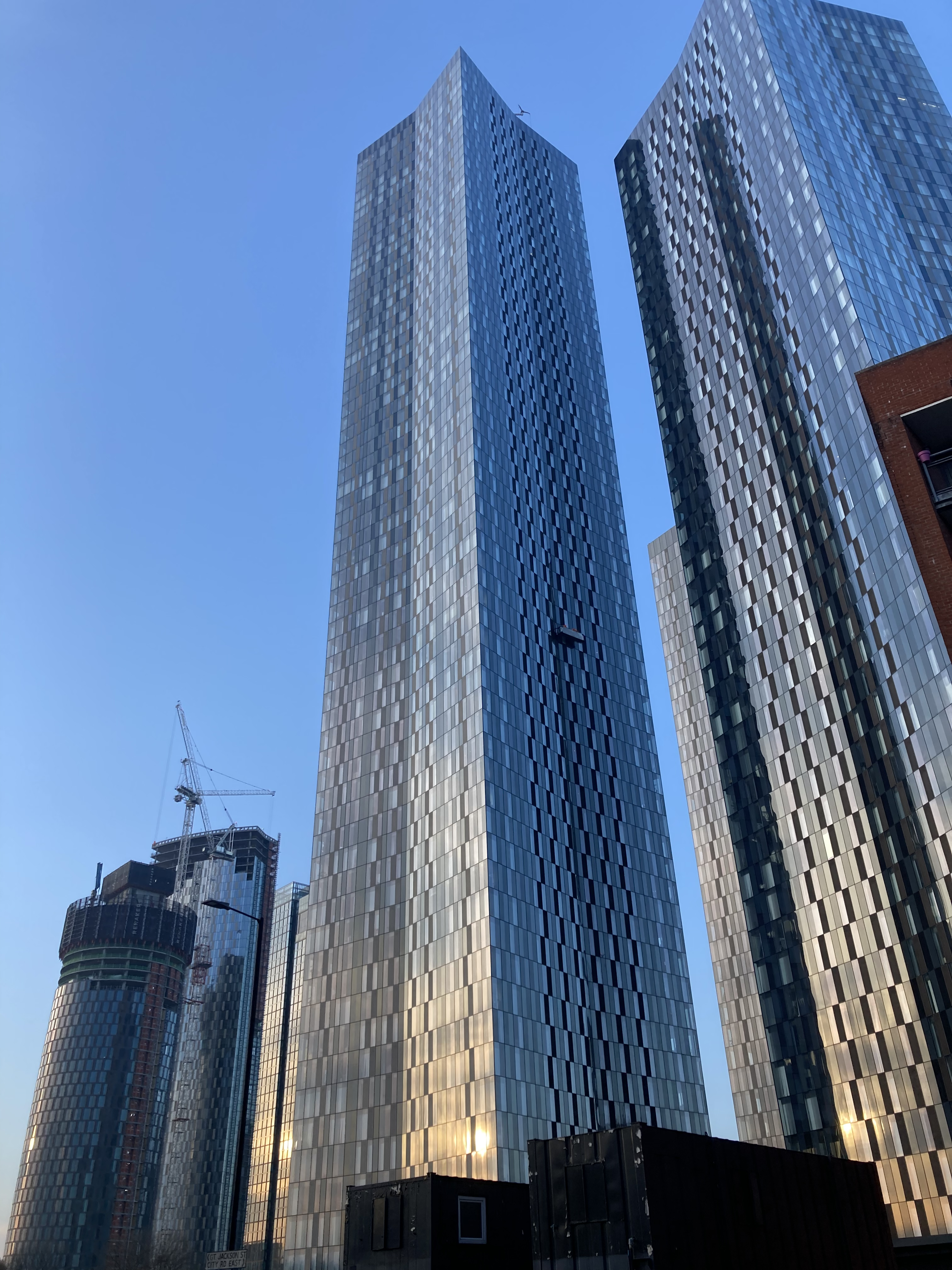
Deansgate Square, December 2022

== See also ==
- Beetham Tower – the former tallest completed building in Manchester at 169 m (554 ft). South Tower at 201 m (659 ft) became the tallest building in Greater Manchester and outside London in the United Kingdom
- List of tallest buildings and structures in Greater Manchester
- List of tallest buildings in the United Kingdom – as of August 2025, Deansgate Square South Tower is the 12th-tallest building in the United Kingdom
