= London Marriott Hotel Canary Wharf =

Hotel in London

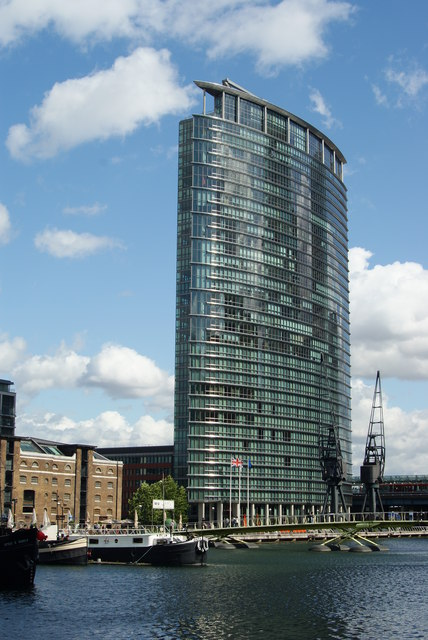
- Marriott Hotel Canary Wharf in 2009

- Location within Greater London

General information
- Location: 22 Hertsmere Road, Poplar, London, England
- Coordinates: 51°30′25.02″N 0°1′15.85″W
- Opening: 2004
- Owner: John Christodoulou
- Management: Marriott Hotels

Design and construction
- Architect: HOK

Other information
- Number of rooms: 301
- Number of suites: 47
- Number of restaurants: 1

The London Marriott Hotel Canary Wharf (previously the London Marriott Hotel West India Quay) is a hotel located at 1 West India Quay, 22 Hertsmere Road, and is named after the Canary Wharf financial estate where it overlooks West India Dock North. It is operated by Marriott Hotels, and has 301 rooms and 47 serviced apartments.

It is owned by the Monaco-based billionaire property developer John Christodoulou.

== Architecture and facilities ==
In 2001, planning permission was gained by Squire and Partners for a slender landmark hotel tower conceived to act as a visual counterpoint to the monumental brick form of the adjacent Victorian warehouses in London's Docklands. Designed by HOK, its elliptical form is reminiscent of the curved hull of a boat. The building was completed in 2004.

The bottom 12 floors of the 33-floor building house the hotel, with 301 rooms on floors 1–8, and 47 serviced suites on floors 9–12. Facilities include the Manhattan Grill Restaurant, 19 event rooms, an executive lounge, a health club and the G & Tea Lounge with over 180 different gins.

The hotel hosts an artist in residence programme, showing the work of contemporary artists including Lincoln Townley in 2015 and Julie Umerle in 2017.

== Incidents ==
In 2006, the hotel gained notoriety when ten Tottenham Hotspur F.C. players suddenly fell ill hours before a crucial Premier League match that was to determine whether the club could secure the lucrative fourth Champions League place. It was initially assumed that they had acquired food poisoning from lasagne consumed at the Marriott in Canary Wharf and which had been "prepared by Marriott chefs to the specifications of the team’s diet and nutrition expert". The hotel's general manager Paul Downing confirmed to the press that "Tottenham ate in a private function room. We provided them with a buffet. Our chefs and catering staff liaised with them over what was on the set menu." With Spurs manager Martin Jol claiming some of his players were still vomiting in the dressing room minutes before the game, an off-colour Spurs would go on to lose 2-1 to West Ham United F.C., thereby missing out on a funding boost of at least £10 million from a spot in European football's top club competition. The team had asked for postponement of the game by a day and then by three hours, but both requests were reportedly refused by Premier League authorities. The sick players were Michael Dawson, Michael Carrick, Edgar Davids, Robbie Keane, Radek Cerny, Calum Davenport, Teemu Tainio, Aaron Lennon, Lee Barnard and Tom Huddlestone, all of whom bar Huddlestone and Cerny had some involvement in the game. The resulting 'lasagne-gate' involved 20 uniformed police officers, plain clothes police and scientific officers arriving on the premises. The suspected dish and blood and urine samples were sent for microbiological testing at independent government laboratories. While the club did not apportion blame with test results pending, their spokesperson said they were not ruling out "foul play" and media reports at the time had suggested Spurs were planning a £10m compensation claim against the hotel and the Premier League. The Premier League authorities also refused a re-play. Ultimately, the lab results showed that the Spurs players had come down with a form of viral gastroenteritis, commonly known as winter vomiting disease, which led to diarrhoea and projectile vomiting at five in the morning of the game against arch-rivals Arsenal. Despite the extensive negative publicity, the hotel did not seek damages or take any legal action. The club refused to return to the hotel the following year, but rekindled their relationship after the controversial replacement of Martin Jol with Juande Ramos.

11 November 2010 saw a fire break out in the hotel's Curve restaurant, forcing an evaluation of the building. Ten fire engines and 50 fire fighters rushed to the scene after being called by Marriott staff at 10.32pm. Harry Redknapp, then manager of Tottenham Hotspur F.C., was among the 200 people who exited the property. It took over four hours to tackle the blaze and paramedics were on site to deal with a number of occupiers suffering smoke inhalation.

At 3:30am on 18 November 2014, alarms went off as another fire took place. Approximately 100 hotel guests were evacuated with firefighters taking an hour and a half to put an end to the fire in the goods lift. No injuries were reported.

In 2016, it emerged that an ISIS-linked terror cell had plotted to attack the premises with images found on seized devices allegedly depicting the West India Quay hotel. The plans were foiled by the security services and arrests made.

== See also ==
- List of tallest buildings and structures in London
- 1 West India Quay
