= Robert Cook (vegan) =

Irish farmer and veganism activist (1646–1726)

- Born: 1646
- Died: 1726 (aged 79–80)
- Other names: Robert Cooke; Linen Cook; Linen Cooke
- Occupations: Farmer; veganism activist

Robert Cook (surname also spelled Cooke; 1646–1726), also known as Linen Cook, was an Irish eccentric farmer and early veganism activist.

== Biography ==
Cook was a wealthy merchant and worked as a woollen manufacturer in Wexford. He was generous and only had poor married people and their children work for him. He corresponded with merchants in Holland for woollen cloths and earned a fortune. He fled to Ipswich during the troubles in the reign of James II. The parliament in Dublin on 7 May 1689 declared him to be attainted as a traitor if he failed to return to Ireland by 1 September. However, after William's victory at the Battle of the Boyne in 1690, the threat was dismissed. Cook resided in Ipswich and Bristol, from 1688 to 1692.

Cook returned to Ireland in the early 1690s and became a vegan. In 1697, author Roger Coke noted that Cook was "a more rigid Pythagorean than any (I think) of the ancients, for he will not drink any thing but water, nor eat any thing which has sensitive life." Cook lived on a farm in Cappoquin, County Waterford and was influenced by Pythagoras. He was a strict vegetarian (later termed vegan) who did not eat or wear anything of animal origin. He opposed the consumption of meat, dairy and eggs. Historian Charles Smith commented that Cook "for many years before he died, neither ate fish, flesh, milk, butter, &c. nor drank any kind of fermented liquor, nor wore woollen clothes, or any other produce of an animal, but linen."

Cook managed his farm by a "Phagorian Philosophy" and all the animals were white, including the horses. He refused to have any black cattle on his farm. He became known as "Linen Cook" because he wore only white linen clothes. He refused leather and wool as he objected to their animal origins. Cook identified as a Protestant. On one occasion when a fox was caught attacking his chickens, Cook prevented his servants from killing it. He gave the fox a lecture on the Fifth Commandment (Thou shalt not kill) and sent it on its way.

Cook married twice. His first wife was from Bristol and he had a pile of stones erected on a rock in the Bristol Channel, known as Cook's Folly. He had three sons and two daughters with his second wife, Cecilia.

Cook's diet consisted of pulses, corn, vegetables and water. In 1691, Cook published a paper in defence of the "Pythagorean" regime supported by verses from the Bible, refusing to eat any food which came from an animal. The ideas in his paper were criticized by the Athenian Society.

Cook died at Cappoquin Castle around 1726.

== See also ==
- Roger Crab
