= Robert Cooke (cricketer) =

English cricketer (1900–1957)

Personal information
- Born: 25 May 1900; Selly Oak, Birmingham, England
- Died: 14 January 1957 (aged 56); Bournbrook, Birmingham, England
- Batting: Right-handed
- Bowling: Right-arm fast-medium
- Role: Bowler

Domestic team information
- Years: Team
- 1925–1926: Warwickshire
- First-class debut: 16 May 1925 v Somerset
- Last First-class: 14 July 1926 v Glamorgan

Career statistics
| Competition | First-class |
|---|---|
| Matches | 15 |
| Runs scored | 66 |
| Batting average | 3.88 |
| 100s/50s | 0/0 |
| Top score | 14 |
| Balls bowled | 1,248 |
| Wickets | 16 |
| Bowling average | 31.68 |
| 5 wickets in innings | 1 |
| 10 wickets in match | 0 |
| Best bowling | 5/22 |
| Catches/stumpings | 6/– |
- Source: ESPNcricinfo, 26 December 2022

Robert Cooke (25 May 1900 – 14 January 1957) was an English first-class cricketer who played in 15 matches for Warwickshire from 1925 to 1926.

Born in Selly Oak, Birmingham, Cooke was a right-arm fast-medium bowler and a right-handed tail-end batsman. In his second first-class match, the game against Kent at the Nevill Ground, Tunbridge Wells, in July 1925, he finished off the Kent first innings with a hat-trick of three wickets in three balls, in fact taking four wickets in five balls; later in the same match, he was himself part of a hat-trick taken by the Kent bowler Charlie Wright which finished off the Warwickshire second innings. Cooke's figures of five wickets for 22 runs in Kent's first innings were by some distance the best of his career, and in no other innings in a brief first-class career did he take more than two wickets.

Cooke died at age 56 on 14 January 1957 in Bournbrook, Birmingham.
