= Bert Cook (footballer) =

English footballer

Personal information
- Full name: Herbert Cook
- Date of birth: 1888
- Place of birth: Sheffield, England
- Position: Outside left

Senior career*
Years	Team	Apps	(Gls)
- Worksop Town
- Thorpe Hesley
1908–1912	Sheffield United	3	(1)
1912–1913	Doncaster Rovers		(4)
1913–1914	Chesterfield	12	(3)
1914–1919	Mexborough Town		
1919–1920	Halifax Town		
- * Club domestic league appearances and goals

Herbert Cook (1888 – after 1919) was an English footballer who played a handful of games in the Football League for Sheffield United. He also had spells at a number of other local teams including Doncaster Rovers and Chesterfield.

== Career ==
Cook signed for Sheffield United in 1908 but failed to make a first team appearance until 1910. He was a part-time player who worked at local firm Mappin & Webb and turned down the offer of a full-time contract from the club. Instead he moved to Doncaster Rovers on part-time terms, following which he moved on to a number of local clubs. Cook did return to play for the Blades on a couple of occasions as a guest player during World War I, as well as some appearances for Watford during the same period, before joining the Royal Flying Corps for the remainder of the war.
