= Bobby Cook (footballer) =

English footballer

Personal information
- Full name: Robert Kenneth Cook
- Date of birth: 13 June 1924
- Place of birth: Letchworth, England
- Date of death: 1997 (aged 72–73)
- Position: Winger

Senior career*
Years	Team	Apps	(Gls)
	Letchworth	?	(?)
1948–1949	Reading	?	(0)
1949–1951	Tottenham Hotspur	3	(0)
1951–1952	Watford	53	(8)
- * Club domestic league appearances and goals

Robert Kenneth Cook (13 June 1924 – 1997) was an English professional footballer who played for Letchworth, Reading, Tottenham Hotspur and Watford.

== Playing career ==
Cook began his career with non-league club Letchworth before joining Reading. In July, 1949 the Wwinger signed for Tottenham Hotspur where he featured in three first team matches in 1949. He transferred to Watford in August, 1951 and went on to make a further 53 appearances and scoring on eight occasions.
