= MWB Group Holdings =

Property company of the United Kingdom

- Industry: Property
- Founded: 1982
- Headquarters: London, UK
- Revenue: £277.8 million (2008)
- Operating income: £17.1 million (2008)
- Net income: £(9.9) million (2008)

MWB Group Holdings was a British-based property investment and development business. It was "no longer trading" in 2015 and dissolved in April 2018.

== History ==
The company was founded by Richard Balfour-Lynn as a property development business under the name Warwick Balfour Properties plc in 1982.

It adopted a new structure and the name Marylebone Warwick Balfour Group plc in 1994. In 1997, it undertook a reverse takeover of Ex-Lands Properties plc and thereby secured a listing on the London Stock Exchange. In 2008, it underwent a capital reorganisation, with a new holding company, MWB Group Holdings plc.

After getting into financial difficulties, the company was put into administration in 2012. As of late 2015, together with MWB Management Services, and MWB Serviced Office Holdings, the company was recorded by Companies House as "in liquidation". Also as of late 2015, hospitality business magazine The Caterer listed MWG Group Holdings as "no longer trading".

== Operations ==
The Group's business interests included providing serviced office accommodation at offices in the UK through a 71.5% interest in MWB Business Exchange plc, the Malmaison and Hotel du Vin hotel chains, as well as the Liberty & Co. department store on Regent Street in the West End of London's shopping district.
