= P&T =

P&T may refer to:

- Partitioning and transmutation, a succession of chemical separation operations (advanced reprocessing) and neutron irradiation repeated in long nuclear fuel cycles aimed at reducing the radiotoxicity of minor actinides and long-lived fission products
- Post & Telegraph, former cabinet department of the Government of India
- Minister for Posts and Telegraphs, former senior government position in Ireland
- Pharmacy and Therapeutics
- Pharmacy and Therapeutics (journal)
- Penn & Teller, American illusionists and entertainers
- P&TLuxembourg, Luxembourg communications corporation
- P & T Architects & Engineers Ltd., an architecture firm in Hong Kong
- Promotion and Tenure, referring to academic tenure processes
- Packaging and testing, semiconductor
