= Craiglockhart Primary School =

Coordinates: 55°55′54″N 3°13′40″W

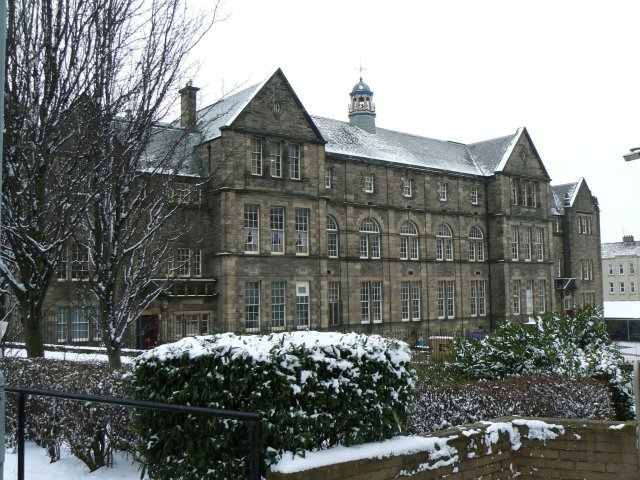

Location
- 90 Ashley Terrace; Edinburgh, EH11 1RG; Scotland

Information
- Type: Primary school
- Established: 1901
- Local authority: Edinburgh City
- Headteacher: Sonja Brown
- Gender: Coeducational
- Age: 4 to 12
- Website: http://www.craiglockhart.edin.sch.uk/

Listed Building – Category B
- Official name: Ashley Terrace Craiglockhart Primary School With Caretaker’s Lodge Playshed Gates Gatepiers and Railings
- Designated: 9 February 1993; 33 years ago
- Reference no.: LB26717

Craiglockhart Primary School is a primary school in the Shandon area of Edinburgh. The school buildings are in the Victorian style of architecture.

== History ==
The school was built in 1901 after a design by architects Robert Wilson and John Alexander Carfrae. It has been designated as a Category B listed building by Historic Scotland.
