= Trevor Jones =

Trevor Jones may refer to:

- Trevor Jones (Australian footballer) (1918–1985), Australian rules footballer who played with North Melbourne
- Trevor Jones (Welsh footballer) (1923–1983), Association footballer for Watford
- Trevor Jones (admiral), Australian deputy chief of Navy
- Trevor Jones (artist), Canadian artist
- Trevor Jones, the birth name of musician and composer John Du Prez (born 1946)
- Trevor Jones (composer) (born 1949), South African orchestral film score composer
- Trevor Jones (cricketer) (1920–2005), English cricketer for Somerset
- Sir Trevor Jones (British politician) (1926–2016), Liverpool Liberal Party politician
- Trevor Jones (Canadian politician), member of the Legislative Assembly of Ontario
- Trevor Jones (priest) (born 1948), first archdeacon of Hertford
- Trevor Jones (rower) (born 1997), Canadian rower
- Trevor M. Jones (born 1942), visiting professor, King's College, University of London, former head of R&D at Wellcome

== See also ==
- Trevor Rees-Jones (disambiguation)
- Trefor Jones (1908–1984), Welsh educator and headmaster
