= Pharmaceutical policy =

Branch of health policy

Pharmaceutical policy is a branch of health policy that deals with the development, provision and use of medications within a health care system. It embraces drugs (both brand name and generic), biologics (products derived from living sources, as opposed to chemical compositions), vaccines and natural health products.

== Funding of research in the life sciences ==
In many countries, an agency of the national government (in the U.S. the NIH, in the U.K. the MRC, and in India the DST) funds university researchers to study the causes of disease, which in some cases leads to the development of discoveries which can be transferred to pharmaceutical companies and biotechnology companies as a basis for drug development. By setting its budget, its research priorities and making decisions about which researchers to fund, there can be a significant impact on the rate of new drug development and on the disease areas in which new drugs are developed. For example, a major investment by the NIH into research on HIV in the 1980s certainly could be viewed as an important foundation for the many antiviral drugs that have subsequently been developed.

== Patent law ==
While patent laws are written to apply to all inventions, whether mechanical, pharmaceutical, or electronic, the interpretations of patent law made by government patent granting agencies (the United States Patent and Trademark Office, for example) and courts, can be very subject-matter specific with significant impact on the incentives for drug development and the availability of lower-priced generic drugs. For example, a recent decision by the United States Court of Appeals for the Federal Circuit in Pfizer v. Apotex, 480 F.3d 1348 (Fed.Cir.2007), held invalid a patent on the "pharmaceutical salt" formulation of a previously patented active ingredient. If that decision is not overturned by the United States Supreme Court, generic versions of the drug in controversy, Norvasc (amlodipine besylate) will be available much earlier. If the reasoning of the Federal Circuit in the case is applied more generally to other patents on pharmaceutical formulations, it would have a significant impact in speeding generic drug availability (and, conversely, some negative impact on the incentives and funding for the research and development of new drugs).

== Licensing ==
This involves the approval of a product for sale in a jurisdiction. Typically a national agency such as the US Food and Drug Administration (specifically, the Center for Drug Evaluation and Research, or CDER), the UK Medicines and Healthcare products Regulatory Agency or Health Canada or Ukrainian Drug Registration Agency is responsible for reviewing a product and approving it for sale. The regulatory process typically focuses on quality, safety and efficacy. In Japan, pharmacovigilance is overseen by the Pharmaceuticals and Medical Devices Agency and the Ministry of Health, Labour and Welfare. In China, these matters are handled by the National Center for Adverse Drug Reaction Monitoring under the Ministry of Health of China. All companies wishing to sell their products in Saudi Arabia must register with the SFDA (Saudi Food and Drug Authority). To be approved for sale a product must demonstrate that it is generally safe (or has a favourable risk/benefit profile relative to the condition it is intended to treat), that it does what the manufacturer claims and that it is produced to high standards. Internal staff and expert advisory committees review products. Once approved, a product is given an approval letter or issued with a notice of compliance, indicating that it may now be sold in the jurisdiction. In some cases, such approvals may have conditions attached, requiring, for example additional 'post-marketing' trials to clarify an issue (such as efficacy in certain patient populations or interactions with other products) or criteria limiting the product to certain uses.

== Pricing ==
In many jurisdictions drug prices are regulated. For example, in the UK the Pharmaceutical Price Regulation Scheme is intended to ensure that the National Health Service is able to purchase drugs at "reasonable prices". In Canada, the Patented Medicine Prices Review Board examines drug pricing, compares the proposed Canadian price to that of seven other countries and determines if a price is "excessive" or not. In these circumstances, drug manufacturers must submit a proposed price to the appropriate regulatory agency.

== Reimbursement ==
Once a regulatory agency has determined the clinical benefit and safety of a product and pricing has been confirmed (if necessary), a drug manufacturer will typically submit it for evaluation by a payer of some sort. Payers may be private insurance plans, governments (through the provision of benefits plans to insured populations or specialized entities like Cancer Care Ontario, which funds in-hospital oncology drugs) or health care organizations such as hospitals. At this point the critical issue is cost-effectiveness. This is where the discipline of pharmaco-economics is often applied. This is a specialized field of health economics that looks at the cost/benefit of a product in terms of quality of life, alternative treatments (drug and non-drug) and cost reduction or avoidance in other parts of the health care system (for example, a drug may reduce the need for a surgical intervention, thereby saving money). Structures like the UK's National Institute for Health and Clinical Excellence and Canada's Common Drug Review evaluate products in this way. Some jurisdictions do not, however, evaluate products for cost-effectiveness. In some instances, individual drug benefit plans (or their administrators) may also evaluate products. Additionally, hospitals may have their own review committees (often called a Pharmacy and Therapeutics (P&T) committee) to make decisions about which drugs to fund from the hospital budget.

Drug plan administrators may also apply their own pricing rules outside of that set by national pricing agencies. For example, British Columbia uses a pricing model called reference-based pricing to set the price of drugs in certain classes. Many US pharmacy benefit managers (PBMs) use strategies like tiered formularies and preferred listings to encourage competition and downward pricing pressure, resulting in lower prices for benefits plans. Competitive procurement of this sort is common among large purchasers such as the US Veteran's Health Administration.

Typically, a manufacturer will provide an estimate of the projected use of a drug as well as the expected fiscal impact on a drug plan's budget. If necessary, a drug plan may negotiate a risk-sharing agreement to mitigate the potential for an unexpectedly large budget impact due to incorrect assumptions and projections.

Because the clinical trials used to generate information to support drug licensing are limited in scope and duration, drug plans may request ongoing post-market trials (often called Phase IV or pragmatic clinical trials) to demonstrate a product's 'real world safety and effectiveness.' These may take the form of a patient registry or other means of data collection and analysis.

Once a product is deemed cost-effective, a price negotiated (or applied in the case of a pricing model) and any risk-sharing agreement negotiated, the drug is placed on a drug list or formulary. Prescribers may choose drugs on the list for their patients, subject to any conditions or patient criteria.

== Formulary management ==
At the core of most reimbursement regimes is the drug list, or formulary. Managing this list can involve many different approaches. Negative lists – products that are not reimbursed under any circumstances are used in some jurisdictions (cf. Germany). More dynamic formularies may have graduated listings such as Ontario's recent conditional listing model. As mentioned, formularies may be used to drive choice to lower cost drugs by structuring a sliding scale of co-payments favouring cheaper products or those for which there is a preferential agreement with the manufacturer. This is the principle underlying preferred drug lists used in many US state Medicaid programs. Some jurisdictions and plans (such as Italy) may also categorize drugs according to their 'essentialness' and determine the level of reimbursement the plan will provide and the portion that the patient is expected to pay.

Formularies may also segment drugs into categories for which a prior authorization is needed. This is usually done to limit the use of a high cost drug or one that has potential for inappropriate use (sometimes called 'off-label' as it involves using a product to treat conditions other than those for which its license was granted). In this circumstance a health care provider would have to seek permission to prescribe the product or the pharmacist would have to obtain permission prior to dispensing it.

== Eligibility ==
Depending on the structure of the health care system, drugs may be purchased by patients themselves, a health care organization on behalf of patients or an insurance plan (public or private). Hospitals typically limit eligibility to their in-patients. Private plans may be employer-sponsored such as Blue Cross, mandated by legislation, as in Quebec or consist of an outsourcing arrangement for a public plan, such as the US Medicare Part D scheme. Public plans may be structured in a variety of ways including:

1. Universal, as in Australia's Pharmaceutical Benefits Scheme
2. Restricted by age, as in the Ontario Drug Benefit Plan for seniors
3. Segmented by disease group, such as Manitoba's cystic fibrosis drug plan
4. Geared to income, such as US Medicaid programs in many states

Additionally, plans may be structured to respond to the 'catastrophic' impact of drug expenses incurred by those with serious diseases or high drug spending relative to income. These patient populations, often called 'medically needy,' may have all or part of their drug costs covered by 'plans of last resort,' (typically government-sponsored). One such plan is Ontario's Trillium Drug Program.

Pharmaceutical policy may also be used to respond to health crises. For example, Argentina launched REMEDIAR during its financial crisis of 2002. The government-sponsored program provides a specified list of essential drugs to primary care clinics in low-income neighbourhoods. Similarly, Brazil provides drugs for HIV/AIDS free to all citizens as a deliberate public health policy choice.

Eligibility policy also focuses on cost-sharing between a plan and the beneficiary (the insured person). Co-payments may be used to drive certain prescribing choices (for example, favouring generic over brand drugs or preferred over non-preferred products). Deductibles may be used as part of geared to income plans.

== Prescribing ==
Pharmaceutical policy may also attempt to shape and inform prescribing. Prescribing may be limited to physicians or include certain classes of health care providers such as nurse practitioners and pharmacists. There may be limitations placed on each class of provider. This may take the form of prescribing criteria for a drug, limiting its prescribing to a particular type of specialist physician for example (such as HIV/AIDS drugs to physicians with advanced training in this area), or it may involve special drug lists that a specific type of health care provider (such as a nurse practitioner) may prescribe from.

Plans may also seek to influence prescribing by providing information to prescribers. This practice is often called 'academic detailing' to differentiate it from the detailing (provision of drug information) done by pharmaceutical companies. Organizations such as Australia's National Prescribing Service typify this technique, providing independent information, including head-to-head comparisons and cost-effectiveness information to prescribers to influence their choices.

Additionally, efforts to promote the 'appropriate use' of medications may also involve other providers like pharmacists providing clinical consulting services. In settings such as hospitals and long-term care, pharmacists often collaborate closely with physicians to ensure optimal prescribing choices are made. In some jurisdictions, such as Australia, pharmacists are compensated for providing medication reviews for patients outside of acute or long-term care settings. Pharmacist collaboration with family physicians in order to improve prescribing may also be funded.

== Pharmacy services ==
Pharmaceutical policy may also encompass how drugs are provided to beneficiaries. This includes the mechanics of drug distribution and dispensing as well as the funding of such services. For example, some HMOs in the US use a 'central fill' approach where all prescriptions are packaged and shipped from a central location instead of at a community pharmacy. In other jurisdictions, retail pharmacies are compensated for dispensing drugs to eligible beneficiaries. A state-operated approach may also be taken, as with Sweden's Apoteket, which had the monopoly on retail pharmacy until 2009, and was not-for-profit. Pharmaceutical policy may also subsidize smaller, more marginal pharmacies, using the rationale that they are needed health care providers. The UK's Essential Small Pharmacies Scheme works this way.

== See also ==
- International Conference on Harmonisation of Technical Requirements for Registration of Pharmaceuticals for Human Use
- Medical cannabis
- National pharmaceuticals policy
- Vaccination policy
