= London Street Primary School =

Historic listed building in Scotland

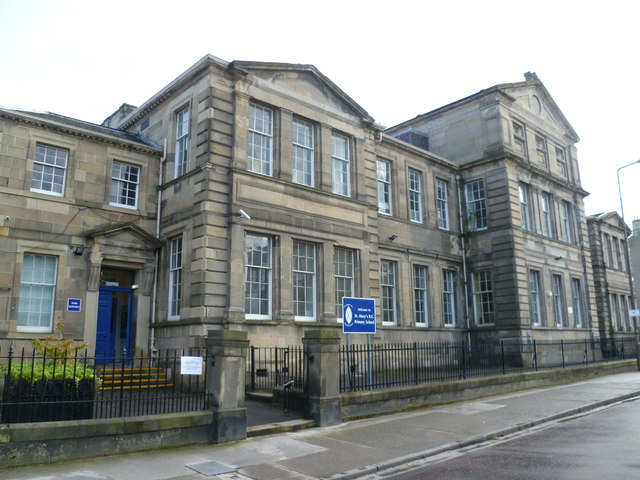
The London Street Primary School building in 2011

London Street Primary School is a Category B-listed building in Edinburgh, Scotland. The building was designed in 1887 by Robert Wilson and later altered in 1910 by John Alexander Carfrae. The listing by Historic Environment Scotland describes the building as being a "symmetrical classical school building" in polished ashlar with a "19-bay principal elevation" of "2-storey and attic".

The school was closed by Lothian Regional Council in 1992 and merged with Broughton Primary School. The building has since been occupied by St Mary's R.C. Primary School, which had previously been located in York Lane.
