= Trevor Rees-Jones =

Trevor Rees-Jones may refer to:

- Trevor Rees-Jones (bodyguard) (born 1968), also known as Trevor Rees, British bodyguard to Diana, Princess of Wales
- Trevor Rees-Jones (businessman) (born 1951), American attorney, business executive and philanthropist

== See also ==
- Trevor J. Rees (1913–1999), American football player, coach, and college athletics administrator
- Trevor Jones (disambiguation)
