= Drummond Community High School =

Coordinates: 55°57′39.64″N 3°11′23.41″W

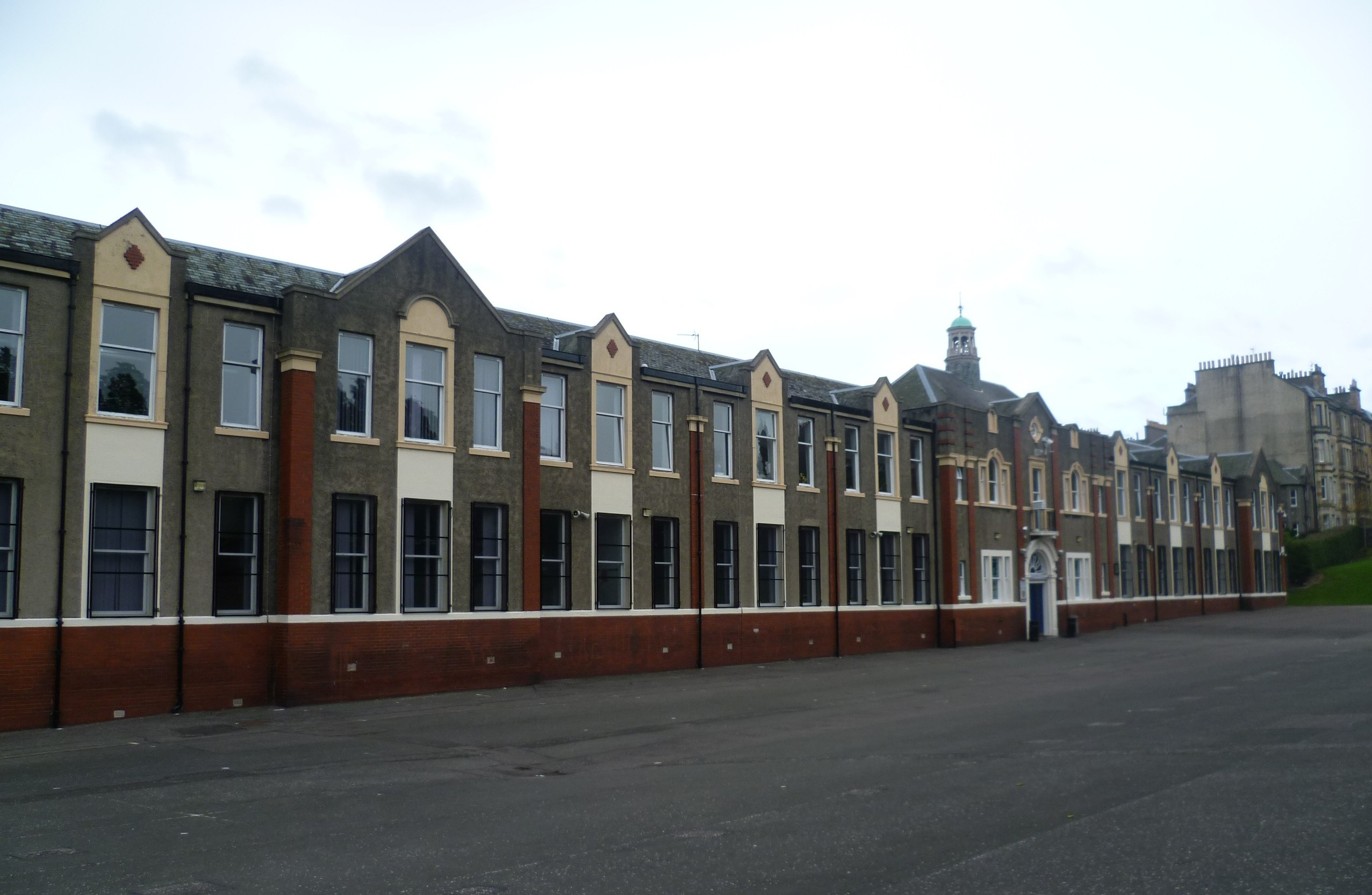

Location
- 41 Bellevue Place; Edinburgh, City of Edinburgh, EH7 4BS; Scotland

Information
- Type: State funded Community High School
- Motto: Nurturing Big Ambitions
- Established: 1926
- Department for Education URN: 5532531 Tables
- Headteacher: Rachel Robertson - Present
- Gender: Mixed
- Age: 11 to 18
- Enrolment: Around 600 school pupils and approximately 400 adult learners in evening
- Houses: Claremont, Annandale, Bellevue
- Colours: Maroon & Gold (badge) Black & While (uniform) School Ties: Blue (S1 - S5) & Black - (S6)
- Local authority: City of Edinburgh Council
- Cluster: Drummond Cluster (includes feeder schools: Abbeyhill Primary School, Broughton Primary School, Leith Walk Primary School, and from up to 20 non-district primary schools)
- Website: http://www.drummondhigh.org/

Drummond Community High School (DCHS) is a non-denominational secondary school built originally in 1926 by John Alexander Carfrae which serves the area of north east Edinburgh. Drummond Community High School is on Bellevue Place and was originally known as Bellevue Junior Secondary School. The catchment area serves an area to the east of the city including the southern areas of Leith, Hillside, Abbeyhill, Broughton and Bellevue. In addition to the school roll of around 625 the school provides places for over 400 adult day learners and approximately 400 adult learners.

== Notable alumni ==
- Isis Hainsworth, actress
