= Trevor Jones (artist) =

Canadian artist

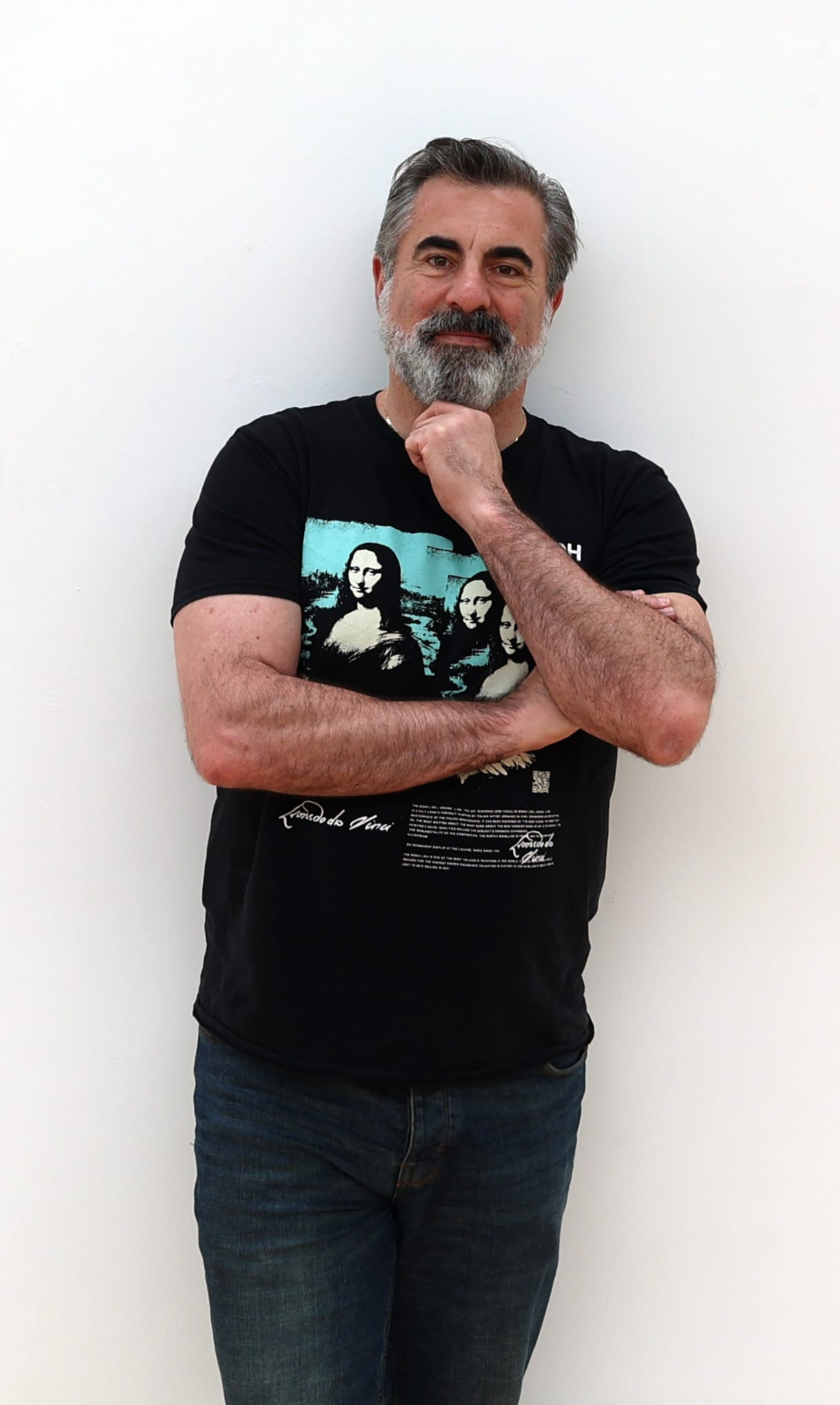
- Photoshoot May 2023
- Occupation: Artist
- Notable work: The Oath; The Famous; Would I Lie to You: the Art of Politics and Propaganda; The Bitcoin Angel
- Website: trevorjonesart.com

Trevor Jones is a Canadian-born artist based in Edinburgh, Scotland. Primarily a painter, he has incorporated technology such as QR codes, NFTs, Augmented Reality and Generative AI into his work.

== Early life and career ==
Trevor Jones graduated from Edinburgh University's MA in Fine Arts Programme in 2008. His first solo exhibition, Synaesthesia II, displayed in Union Gallery in Broughton Street in 2010. In 2012 he participated in an exhibition called Mark of Beauty curated by art historian Bill Hare in the same gallery. Jones's contribution focused on QR codes, including functional QR codes in his work that the viewer could scan.

The actor Brian Cox and the Scottish singer songwriter KT Tunstall appeared in his 2017 collection, The Famous.

In 2021, Jones achieved a record sale with a piece of digital artwork titled The Bitcoin Angel, which earned him £2.4 million as an NFT.

In 2021 he worked with Ice Cube to create Man vs Machine which was a mixed media body of work.

His interest in technology led him to explore augmented reality and QR code integration in his artwork. His collection Would I Lie to You: the Art of Politics and Propaganda combined fine art portraits with AR technology.

Jones created an art installation on London's Oxford Street to commemorate the coronation of King Charles III. Jones' piece, The Oath appeared across large screens on the W1 Curates building, a public art display in Oxford Street.

The piece was originally a physical painting in Jones' Edinburgh studio. It portrays St Edward's Crown.
