= Health policy =

Policy area that deals with the health system of a country or other organization

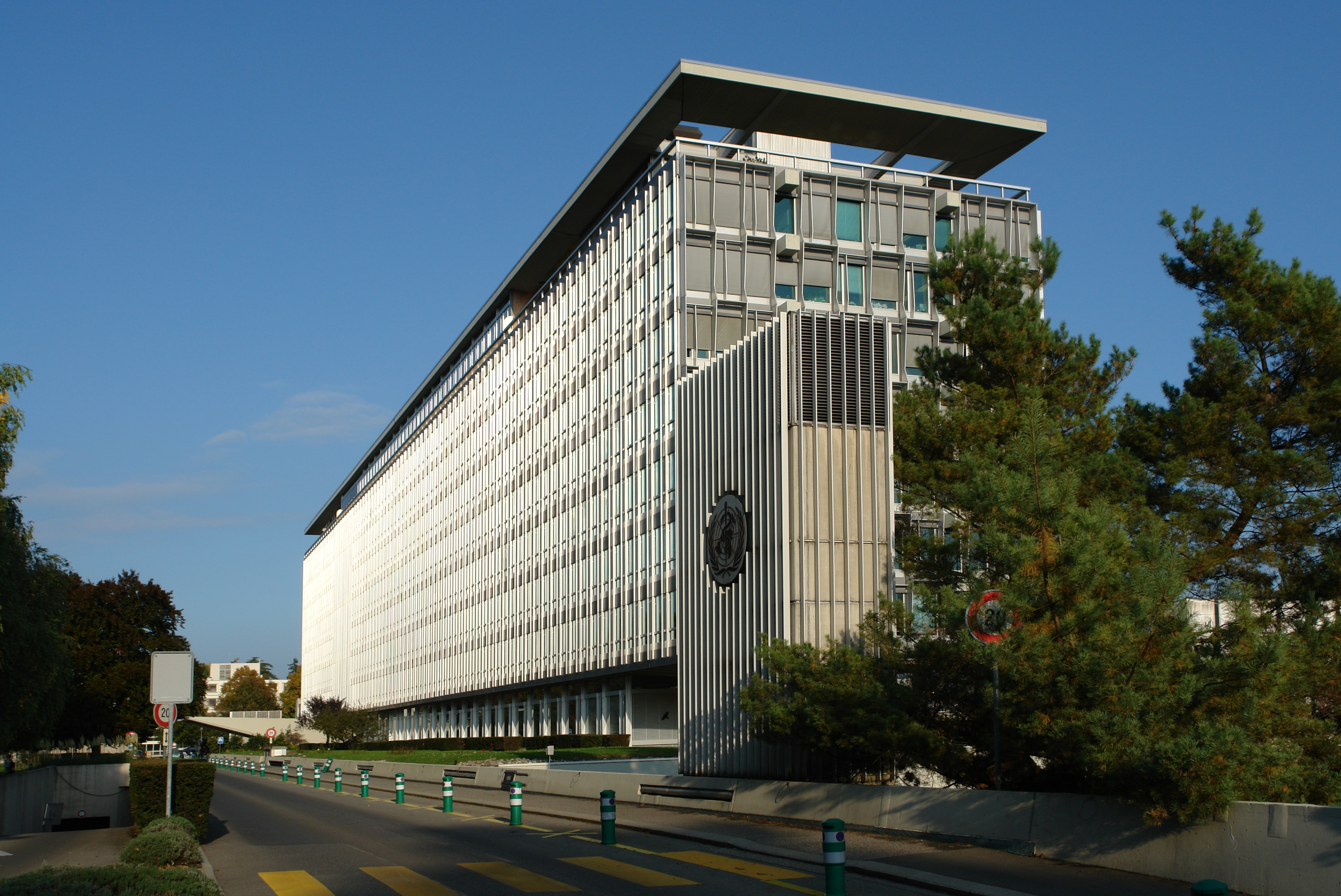
The headquarters of the World Health Organization in Geneva, Switzerland.

Health policy can be defined as the "decisions, plans, and actions that are undertaken to achieve specific healthcare goals within a society". According to the World Health Organization, an explicit health policy can achieve several things: it defines a vision for the future; it outlines priorities and the expected roles of different groups; and it builds consensus and informs people.

== Different approaches ==
Health policy often refers to the health-related content of a policy. Understood in this sense, there are many categories of health policies, including global health policy, public health policy, mental health policy, health care services policy, insurance policy, personal healthcare policy, pharmaceutical policy, and policies related to public health such as vaccination policy, tobacco control policy or breastfeeding promotion policy. Health policy may also cover topics related to healthcare delivery, for example of financing and provision, access to care, quality of care, and health equity.

Health policy also includes the governance and implementation of health-related policy, sometimes referred to as health governance, health systems governance or healthcare governance. Conceptual models can help show the flow from health-related policy development to health-related policy and program implementation and to health systems and health outcomes. Policy should be understood as more than a national law or health policy that supports a program or intervention. Operational policies are the rules, regulations, guidelines, and administrative norms that governments use to translate national laws and policies into programs and services. The policy process encompasses decisions made at a national or decentralized level (including funding decisions) that affect whether and how services are delivered. Thus, attention must be paid to policies at multiple levels of the health system and over time to ensure sustainable scale-up. A supportive policy environment will facilitate the scale-up of health interventions.

There are many aspects of politics and evidence that can influence the decision of a government, private sector business or other group to adopt a specific policy. Evidence-based policy relies on the use of science and rigorous studies such as randomized controlled trials to identify programs and practices capable of improving policy relevant outcomes. Most political debates surround personal health care policies, especially those that seek to reform healthcare delivery, and can typically be categorized as either philosophical or economic. Philosophical debates center around questions about individual rights, ethics and government authority, while economic topics include how to maximize the efficiency of health care delivery and minimize costs.

Countries with universal health care Countries with universal health care Countries without universal healthcare Countries without universal healthcare Unknown

The modern concept of healthcare involves access to medical professionals from various fields as well as medical technology, such as medications and surgical equipment. It also involves access to the latest information and evidence from research, including medical research and health services research.

In many countries it is left to the individual to gain access to healthcare goods and services by paying for them directly as out-of-pocket expenses, and to private sector players in the medical and pharmaceutical industries to develop research. Planning and production of health human resources is distributed among labour market participants.

Other countries have an explicit policy to ensure and support access for all of its citizens, to fund health research, and to plan for adequate numbers, distribution and quality of health workers to meet healthcare goals. Many governments around the world have established universal health care, which takes the burden of healthcare expenses off of private businesses or individuals through pooling of financial risk. There are a variety of arguments for and against universal healthcare and related health policies. Healthcare is an important part of health systems and therefore it often accounts for one of the largest areas of spending for both governments and individuals all over the world.

== Personal healthcare policy options ==
=== Philosophy: right to health ===
Many countries and jurisdictions integrate a human rights philosophy in directing their healthcare policies. The World Health Organization reports that every country in the world is party to at least one human rights treaty that addresses health-related rights, including the right to health as well as other rights that relate to conditions necessary for good health. The United Nations' Universal Declaration of Human Rights (UDHR) asserts that medical care is a right of all people:

- UDHR Article 25: "Everyone has the right to a standard of living adequate for the health and well-being of himself and of his family, including food, clothing, housing and medical care and necessary social services, and the right to security in the event of unemployment, illness, disability, widowhood, old age or other lack of livelihood in circumstances beyond his control."

In some jurisdictions and among different faith-based organizations, health policies are influenced by the perceived obligation shaped by religious beliefs to care for those in less favorable circumstances, including the sick. Other jurisdictions and non-governmental organizations draw on the principles of humanism in defining their health policies, asserting the same perceived obligation and enshrined right to health. In recent years, the worldwide human rights organization Amnesty International has focused on health as a human right, addressing inadequate access to HIV drugs and women's sexual and reproductive rights including wide disparities in maternal mortality within and across countries. Such increasing attention to health as a basic human right has been welcomed by the medical journal The Lancet.

There remains considerable controversy regarding policies on who would be paying the costs of medical care for all people and under what circumstances. For example, government spending on healthcare is sometimes used as a global indicator of a government's commitment to the health of its people. On the other hand, one school of thought emerging from the United States rejects the notion of health care financing through taxpayer funding as incompatible with the (considered no less important) right of the physician's professional judgment, and the related concerns that government involvement in overseeing the health of its citizens could erode the right to privacy between doctors and patients. The argument furthers that universal health insurance denies the right of individual patients to dispose of their own income as per their own will.

Another issue in the rights debate is governments' use of legislation to control competition among private medical insurance providers against national social insurance systems, such as the case in Canada's national health insurance program. Laissez-faire supporters argue that this erodes the cost-effectiveness of the health system, as even those who can afford to pay for private healthcare services drain resources from the public system. The issue here is whether investor-owned medical insurance companies or health maintenance organizations are in a better position to act in the best interests of their customers compared to government regulation and oversight. Another claim in the United States perceives government over-regulation of the healthcare and insurance industries as the effective end of charitable home visits from doctors among the poor and elderly.

=== Economics: healthcare financing ===
Public and private health expenditure by country

Many types of health policies exist focusing on the financing of healthcare services to spread the economic risks of ill health. These include publicly funded health care (through taxation or insurance, also known as single-payer systems), mandatory or voluntary private health insurance, and complete capitalization of personal health care services through private companies, and medical savings accounts, among others. The debate is ongoing on which type of health financing policy results in better or worse quality of healthcare services provided, and how to ensure allocated funds are used effectively, efficiently and equitably.

There are many arguments on both sides of the issue of public versus private health financing policies:

Claims that publicly funded healthcare improves the quality and efficiency of personal health care delivery:

- Government spending on health is essential for the accessibility and sustainability of healthcare services and programmes.
- For those people who would otherwise go without care due to lack of financial means, any quality care is an improvement.
- Since people perceive universal healthcare as free (if there is no insurance premium or co-payment), they are more likely to seek preventive care which may reduce the disease burden and overall healthcare costs in the long run.
- Single-payer systems reduce wastefulness by removing the middle man, i.e. private insurance companies, thus reducing the amount of bureaucracy. In particular, reducing the amount of paperwork that medical professionals have to deal with for insurance claims processing allows them to concentrate more on treating patients.

Claims that privately funded healthcare leads to greater quality and efficiencies in personal health care:

- Perceptions that publicly funded healthcare is free can lead to overuse of medical services, and hence raise overall costs compared to private health financing.
- Privately funded medicine leads to greater quality and efficiencies through increased access to and reduced waiting times for specialized health care services and technologies.
- Limiting the allocation of public funds for personal healthcare does not curtail the ability of uninsured citizens to pay for their healthcare as out-of-pocket expenses. Public funds can be better rationalized to provide emergency care services regardless of insured status or ability to pay, such as with the Emergency Medical Treatment and Active Labor Act in the United States.
- Privately funded and operated healthcare reduces the requirement for governments to increase taxes to cover healthcare costs, which may be compounded by the inefficiencies among government agencies due to their greater bureaucracy.

== Other health policy areas ==
Health policy options extend beyond the financing and delivery of personal health care, to domains such as medical research and health workforce planning, both domestically and internationally.

=== Medical research policy ===
Medical research can be both the basis for defining evidence-based health policy, and the subject of health policy itself, particularly in terms of its sources of funding. Those in favor of government policies for publicly funded medical research posit that removing profit as a motive will increase the rate of medical innovation. Those opposed argue that it will do the opposite, because removing the incentive of profit removes incentives to innovate and inhibits new technologies from being developed and utilized.

The existence of sound medical research does not necessarily lead to evidence-based policymaking. For example, in South Africa, whose population sets the record for HIV infections, previous government policy limiting funding and access for AIDS treatments met with strong controversy given its basis on a refusal to accept scientific evidence on the means of transmission. A change of government eventually led to a change in policy, with new policies implemented for widespread access to HIV services. Another issue relates to intellectual property, as illustrated by the case of Brazil, where debates have arisen over government policy authorizing the domestic manufacture of antiretroviral drugs used in the treatment of HIV/AIDS in violation of drug patents.

=== Health workforce policy ===
Some countries and jurisdictions have an explicit policy or strategy to plan for adequate numbers, distribution and quality of health workers to meet healthcare goals, such as to address physician and nursing shortages. Elsewhere, workforce planning is distributed among labour market participants as a laissez-faire approach to health policy. Evidence-based policies for workforce development are typically based on findings from health services research.

=== Health in foreign policy ===
Many governments and agencies include a health dimension in their foreign policy in order to achieve global health goals. Promoting health in lower income countries has been seen as instrumental to achieve other goals on the global agenda, including:

- Promoting global security – linked to fears of global pandemics, the intentional spread of pathogens, and a potential increase in humanitarian conflicts, natural disasters, and emergencies;
- Promoting economic development – including addressing the economic effect of poor health on development, of pandemic outbreaks on the global market place, and also the gain from the growing global market in health goods and services;
- Promoting social justice – reinforcing health as a social value and human right, including supporting the United Nations' Millennium Development Goals.

=== Global health policy ===
Global health policy encompasses the global governance structures that create the policies underlying public health throughout the world. In addressing global health, global health policy "implies consideration of the health needs of the people of the whole planet above the concerns of particular nations." Distinguished from both international health policy (agreements among sovereign states) and comparative health policy (analysis of health policy across states), global health policy institutions consist of the actors and norms that frame the global health response.

== EU health policy ==
The EU contributes to the improvement of public health through financing and laws addressing medications, patient rights in cross-border healthcare, illness prevention, and the promotion of good health. EU countries hold primary responsibility for organizing and delivering health services and medical care. Therefore, EU health policy works to supplement national policies, assure health protection in all EU measures and to strengthen the Health Union. The goals of EU public health policies and initiatives are to protect and improve the health of EU residents, promote the modernization and digitalization of health systems and infrastructure, increase the resilience of Europe's health systems, and improve the ability of EU member states to prevent and respond to pandemics in the future. In a senior-level working group on public health, representatives from the European Commission and national governments debate strategic health concerns. The EU's health policy and yearly work programmes are implemented with the assistance of member states, institutions, and other interest groups.

=== European Commission's role ===
The European Commission's Directorate for Health and Food Safety assists member states in their efforts to protect and improve the health of their people and to guarantee the accessibility, efficiency, and resilience of their healthcare structures. This is accomplished in a number of ways, such as by proposing legislation, providing financial support, coordinating and facilitating the exchange of best practices between EU countries and health experts and by health promotion activities.

=== Legislation ===
The Treaty on the Functioning of the European Union grants the EU the authority to enact health legislation in accordance with Article 168 (protection of public health), Article 114 (single market), and Article 153 (social policy). The EU has adopted legislation in following areas: Patient's rights in cross-border healthcare, Pharmaceuticals and medical devices (pharmacovigilance, falsified medicines, clinical trials), Health security and infectious diseases, Digital health and care, Tobacco, organs, blood, tissues and cells. The Council of the EU can also send recommendations on public health to member states.

==== Patients' rights in cross-border healthcare ====
EU citizens are entitled, by law, to receive healthcare in any member state of the EU and to have their home nation compensate them for care received elsewhere. The European Health Insurance Card (EHIC) guarantees that essential medical care is given under the same conditions and at the same cost as people insured in that country.

==== Medicines and medical devices ====
The EU regulates the authorisation of medicines at EU level by the European Medicines Agency or at the national level by the appropriate authorities in the EU member states.

==== Cross-border health threats ====
To guarantee a high degree of health protection in the European Union, monitoring, early warning, preparedness, and reaction measures to counter major cross-border threats to health are crucial. The European Centre for Disease Prevention and Control (ECDC) offers EU member states independent scientific advice, support, and knowledge on public health risks, including infectious diseases.

==== Promoting health and tackling diseases ====
- Cancer - In addition to its direct effects on people's health and well-being, cancer also affects public finances, healthcare and social systems, productivity, and economic growth, all of which depend on having a healthy labor force. A cancer screening recommendation was endorsed by the Council in 2003, and it encouraged EU nations to put in place population-based, quality-assured screening programs. Cancer screening was limited to breast, cervical and colorectal cancer, so in 2022 member states decided to expand the focus to include prostate, lung and gastric cancer. The EU has also passed a number of measures to shield workers from hazardous substances and chemicals, such as lead and substances that cause cancer and mutagenesis.
- Tobacco - With over 700 000 deaths annually, tobacco use is the single biggest preventable health risk and the leading contributor to premature mortality in the European Union (Approximately 50% of smokers pass away too soon, on average, 14 years before non-smokers). The tobacco products directive establishes guidelines for the production, labeling, and retailing of tobacco and associated goods. High tariffs on tobacco products were implemented by another directive on the structure and rates of excise duty applied to manufactured tobacco, with the goal of reducing tobacco consumption, particularly among youth. The 2009 Council recommendation on smoke-free environments requires all EU member states to take precautions against tobacco smoke exposure for individuals at public places and work.
- Vaccination - Vaccination policy is a competence of member states. The EU helps its member states coordinate their policies and initiatives. In December 2018 the Council approved a recommendation to enhance EU cooperation on diseases that can be prevented by vaccination. This project sets out guidance on addressing vaccine hesitancy, increasing vaccination rates, encouraging procurement coordination for vaccines, and supporting research and innovation. In December 2022, EU ministers of health approved Council conclusions on vaccination as one of the best methods for preventing illness and improving public health. The conclusions focus on two areas of action: fighting vaccine reluctance and preparing for upcoming challenges through EU cooperation.

=== Investing in health ===
The EU4Health program provides funds to tackle cross-border health concerns, improve the availability and cost of medical equipment, pharmaceuticals, other crisis-relevant items, and strengthen the resilience of health systems. Other EU programmes further finance healthcare systems, health research, infrastructure and other broader health-related issues, in particular

- Horizon Europe health cluster - supports innovation and research to create a resilient EU ready to face new challenges, for high-quality digital services that are available to everyone, and accessible, high-quality healthcare.
- EU cohesion funds - invest in health in EU countries and regions
- Resilience and recovery facility

== See also ==
- Global health
- Harm reduction
- Health Advocate
- Health care
- Health care reform
- Health economics
- Health equity
- Health insurance
- Health Insurance Innovations
- Health law
- Health promotion
- Journal of Public Health Policy
- Medical law
- National health insurance
- Patient safety
- Pharmaceutical policy
- Politicization of science
- Public health law
- Social policy
- Socialized medicine
- Two-tier health care
