= Trevor M. Jones =

Trevor Jones CBE
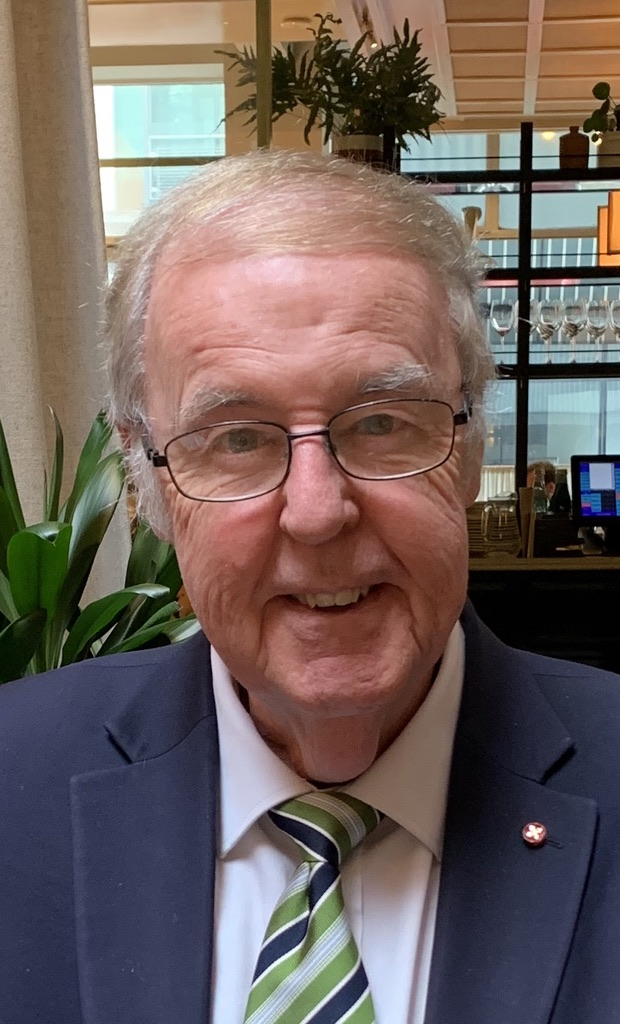
- Born: 19 August 1942 (age 83); Wolverhampton
- Scientific career
- Institutions: Wellcome

Trevor Mervyn Jones (born 19 August 1942) is a visiting professor at King's College London, and a former Head of R&D, at Wellcome. He was main board director for Research & Development at The Wellcome Foundation Ltd (Wellcome plc). During his tenure, the organisation was responsible for the development of a number of significant products.

Jones assisted the Government to attract inward investment into the UK, particularly from the Japanese pharmaceutical companies through the "Prescribe UK" initiative (with Virginia Bottomley and David Sainsbury). He also led negotiations with the UK Government on the Pharmaceutical Price Regulation Scheme (PPRS) when he was head of the ABPI. Until recently he advised the Wales Government on the future of the NHS as a member of The Bevan Commission.

== Education ==
Jones attended Wolverhampton grammar school from 1953 to 1955, followed by Sir George Monoux Grammar School, then King's College London (University of London, Chelsea) where he obtained a PhD degree in 1967 in the Faculty of Medicine.

== Career ==
Jones was a postdoctoral researcher between 1967 and 1968. From 1972 until 1975, Jones was head of development at The Boots Co Ltd. During his time there he was responsible for the technical development of several new products, notably Prothiaden (antidepressant) and Froben (anti-inflammatory), a range of generic products and the technology transfer of Brufen/Nurofen (anti-inflammatory) to many overseas units, notably Upjohn, USA.

Jones worked for the Wellcome Foundation Ltd from 1974 to 1994 and, as R&D Director oversaw over 2,500 staff covering all scientific, technical and medical specialities as well as Quality Assurance and Patents/Agreements. As a member of the Board of Wellcome plc from 1987 to 1994, he was intimately involved in the offering of shares by The Wellcome Trust. During his tenure the disposal of Wellcome's interests in vaccines to Medeva (Evans) and the subsequent re-integration of all aspects of biotechnology into the mainstream business took place. This included working with the biotech joint-venture Wellgen in the USA on the buy-out of the partner (Genetics Institute) share.

During his time as R&D Director, the organisation was responsible for the successful development of Zovirax (anti-herpes); Lamictal (anti-epileptic); Retrovir: AZT (anti-HIVAIDS); Acrivastine (anti-histamine); Atovaquone (PCP/Malaria); Exosurf (infant respiratory distress); Mivacron and Nuromax (neuromuscular blockade); Wellferon (Hepatitis B&C); Zolmitriptan (anti migraine); plus an extensive range of over-the-counter formulations; particularly products for coughs and colds (Sudafed), analgesia (Calpol) and skin care. He also led initiatives concerned with licensing-in of new product opportunities including Centocor (Panorex), Fujisawa USA (LNMMA), Laboratoires Pierre Fabre (Navelbine).

Prior to his appointment to the board of Wellcome plc, Jones was director of Development and established a new Pesticides R&D operation which was included in the sale of the Wellcome hygiene business to Rhône-Poulenc. From 1994 until August 2004, Jones was director general of the Association of the British Pharmaceutical Industry (ABPI) where he directed all the industry activities: government relations on behalf of the 100 national and international pharmaceutical companies. In that capacity, Jones was a member of the UK Government, on the Pharmaceutical Industry Ministerial Strategy Working Group on Pharmaceuticals, on the Board of the European Federation of Pharmaceutical Industries and Associations (EFPIA) and the (IFPMA). For 12 years Jones was a member of the UK Government Regulatory Agency, The Medicines Commission; an advisor to the Cabinet Office on the Human Genome Project in 2001; a member of the Prime Minister's Task force on the Competitiveness of the Pharmaceutical Industry (PICTF) and Chair of the Government Advisory Group on Genetics Research.

From 2004 until 2015, he was a director of Allergan Inc. He was also a member of the board of directors of VeronaPharma plc from 2006 to 2014, a spin-out company developing drugs for COPD, coughs and asthma, the International Clinical Research Organisation, Synexus Ltd from 2007 to 2014 and the CRO Simbec-Orion Group Research. He is a member of the board of the California based pancoronavirus vaccine company Techimmune LLC, a trustee of The UK Stem Cell Foundation, a non-Executive Director of the Life Science Company, Ascension Healthcare plc, the digital diagnostics company EDX Medical Group plc and a member of the Board of NW Pharmatech Ltd. He is a Director of the Drug Discovery company, e-Therapeutics plc. (Chairman 2021-2024) He has served on a number of other boards as director. In the UK: NextPharma Ltd (contract manufacturer), ReNeuron plc from 1998 to 2012 (stem cell therapy), Arix Bioscience plc (Life science investments) and Respiratory Innovation Wales Ltd; in the Netherlands: BAC BV (bioaffinity company), in Italy from 2007 to 2013: Sigma-Tau Finanziaria S.p.A. (Pharmaceuticals), from 2010 to 2011 Tecnogen SpA in the USA: SciClone Inc (Biotech) and President of Sigma-Tau Pharmaceuticals Inc (Rare Diseases) from 2012 to 2013. He was Chairman of the European Union Medicinal Cannabis Association (EUMCA) from 2019 to 2022.

From 2000 until 2008, he was Vice Chair of King's College London Council. He holds honorary degrees/fellowships/gold medals from seven universities, was awarded an Honorary Fellowship of the Royal College of Physicians and The British Pharmacological Society and was elected to the French Academie Nationale de Pharmacie. He is a member of the Industrial Advisory Board and the Vice Chancellor's Advisory Committee at the University of Surrey; a member of the advisory board of the Academy of Pharmaceutical Sciences (APS); formerly a Senator for the European Federation for Pharmaceutical Sciences (EUFEPS); and a member of the advisory board to the School of Management at Swansea University.

He has published more than 150 papers (see further reading below) in learned and professional journals and served on the editorial board of a number of learned journals. The latter are Drug Development Communications (Marcel Dekker) from 1973; the International Journal of Pharmaceutical Technology and Product Manufacture (Childwall University Press) from 1979; the International Journal of Pharmaceutics (Elsevier) from 1984; Journal of Pharmacy and Pharmacology (Pharmaceutical Society of Great Britain) from 1985; Editions de Sante, Revue S.T. Pharma from 1986; "Advances in Pharmaceutical Sciences" Editor with Professor Ganderton, Academic Press from 1987; Journal of Drug Development from 1988; Editorial Advisory Board, "Drugs and the Pharmaceutical Sciences" from 1993; the Journal of Research in Pharmaceutical Economics from 1994. He is a frequent guest lecturer at international pharmaceutical conferences and seminars and has appeared regularly on radio and TV on pharmaceutical and medical issues.

During the period 2003–2005, Jones was a Commissioner at the World Health Organization (WHO) on the Commission for Intellectual Property, Innovation and Public Health (CIPIH).

He was a founder member and a member of the Board of the Medicines for Malaria Venture MMV. Jones advised the Government of the Netherlands on Life Science as a member of the TiPharma Advisory Board. He was also a member of the EU Commission IMI Scientific Advisory Board. In 2005 he was the winner of the SCRIP Life Time Achievement award for his contribution to pharmaceutical sciences and the industry.

== Honours and distinctions ==
- 1987: Harrison Memorial Medal, Royal Pharmaceutical Society of Great Britain
- 1992: Gold Medal, Comenius University
- 1993: Honorary PhD, University of Athens
- 1994: Honorary DSc, University of Strathclyde
- 1994: Fellow of King's College London (FKC)
- 1995: Honorary Faculty of Pharmaceutical Medicine (FFPM)
- 1996: Charter Gold Medal, Royal Pharmaceutical Society of Great Britain
- 1998: Honorary Fellow of the UCL School of Pharmacy
- 1998: Honorary DSc, University of Nottingham
- 1999: PHARMA Outstanding Achievement Award
- 2000: Honorary DSc, University of Bath
- 2001: FIP lifetime award for outstanding contribution to Biotechnology
- 2003: Commander of the Order of the British Empire (CBE)
- 2003: Honorary DSc, University of Bradford
- 2005: Honorary Fellow of the British Pharmacological Society (HonFBPharmacolS)
- 2005: Honorary Fellow of the Royal College of Physicians (Hon FRCP)
- 2005: Winner, SCRIP Life Time Achievement Award
- 2005: Elected to Foreign Fellowship of the Academie Nationale de Pharmacie FRANCE
- 2006: Honorary Fellow of the College of Pharmacy Practice (FCPP)
- 2007: Fellow of the Royal Society of Medicine (FRSM)
- 2015: Eminent Fellow of the Academy of Pharmaceutical Sciences
- 2016: Fellow of The Academy of Medical Sciences
- 2018: Fellow of The Learned Society of Wales
- 2022: Honorary DSc, International Hellenic University, Thessaloniki

== Interests ==
Welsh Rugby, Golf, Gardening

== Clubs and associations ==
Jones is a member of The Athenaeum, Pall Mall, London; a Liveryman of the Guild of Apothecaries, London; and a Freeman of the City of London.
