= Patrick Wilson (architect) =

British architect

- Wilson's grave in Greyfriars Kirkyard
- Born: c.1798
- Died: 6 February 1871 (aged 72–73)
- Burial place: Greyfriars Kirkyard
- Occupation: architect
- Known for: advocate of purpose-built housing for the poor
- Notable work: Colony houses in Edinburgh
- Spouse(s): Catherine Peddie (died 1843), Jane Milne
- Children: 1 son, Robert Wilson
- Father: Robert Wilson

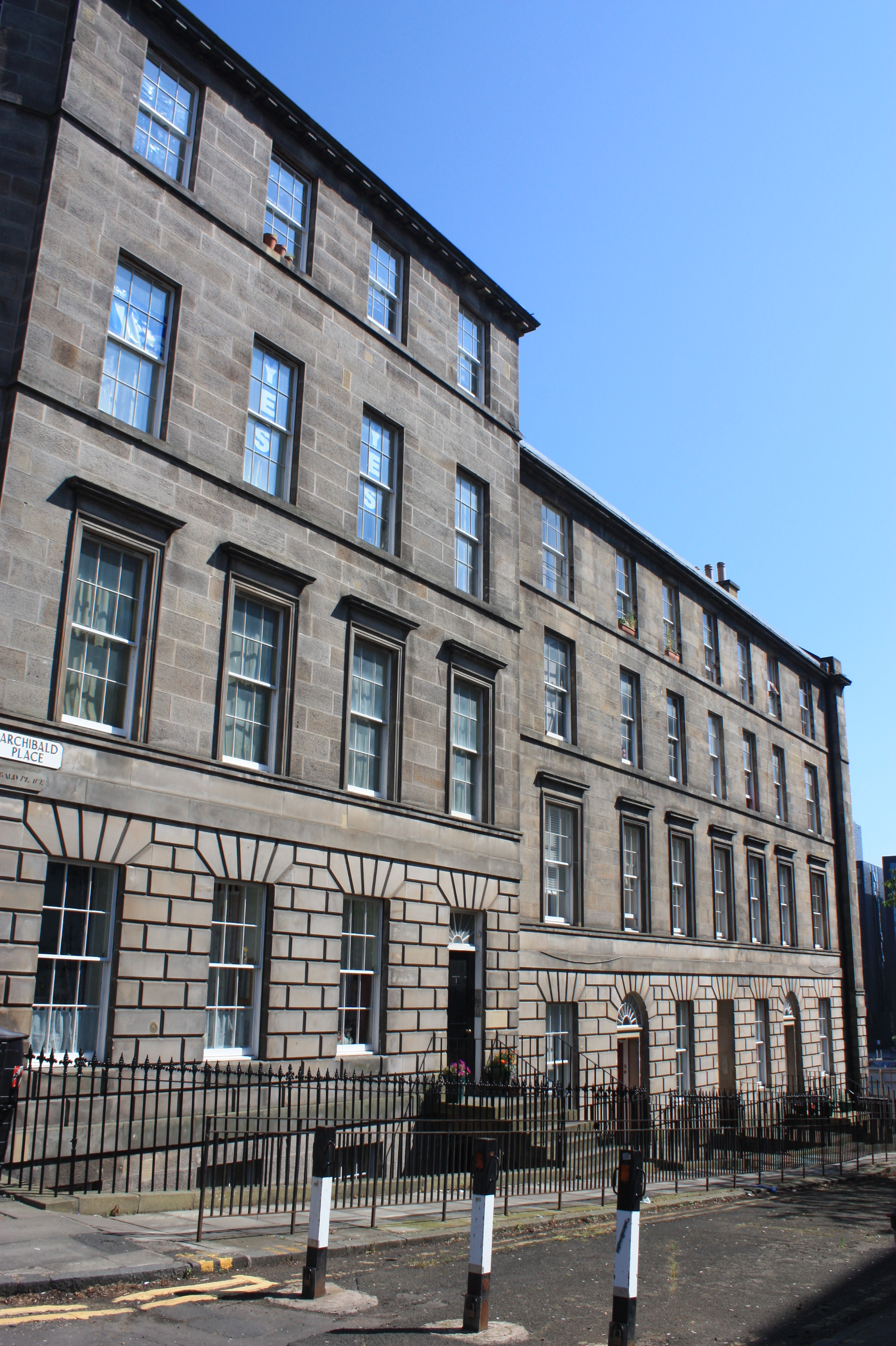
Archibald Place, Edinburgh

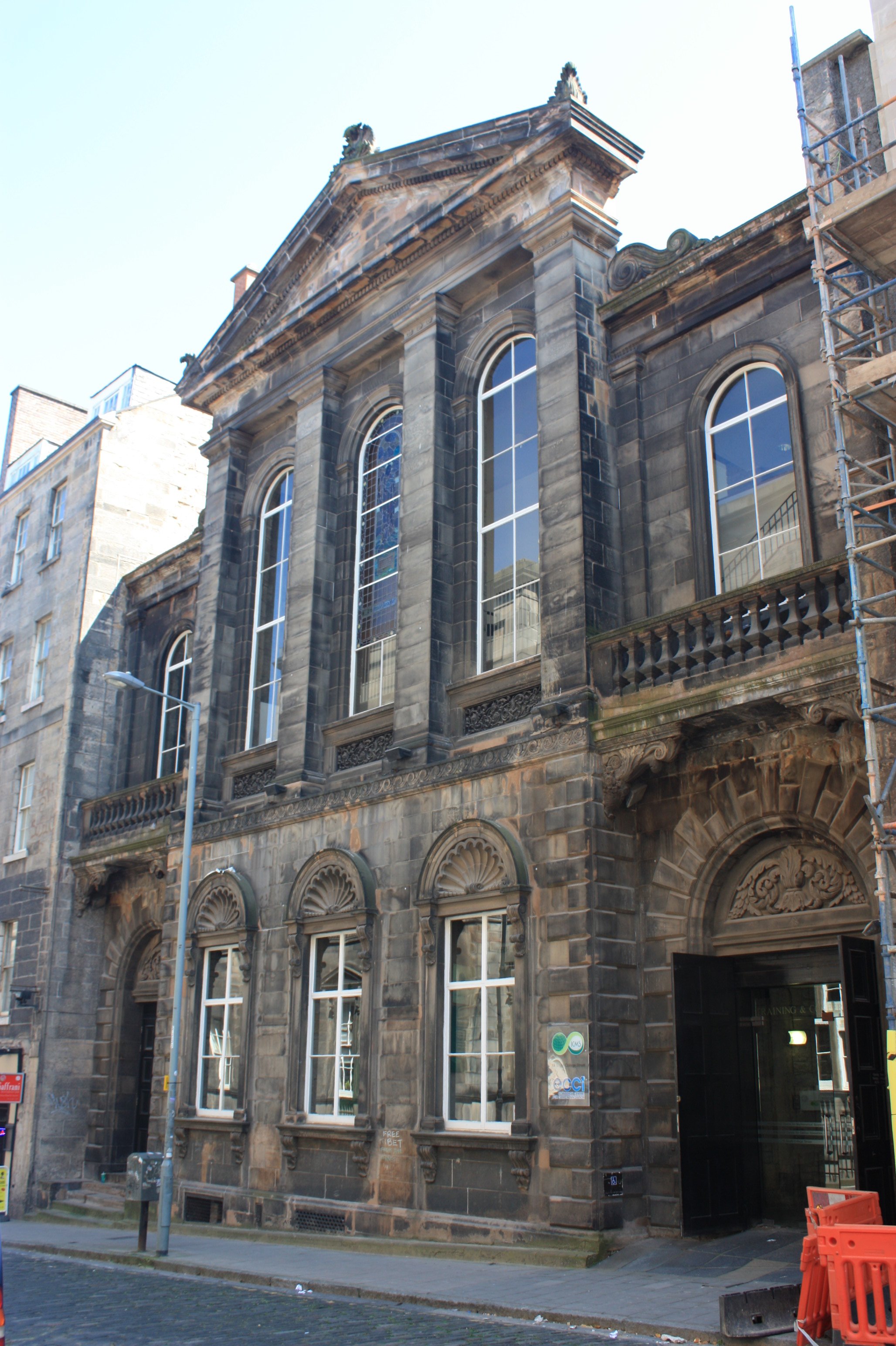
South College Street UP Church, Edinburgh

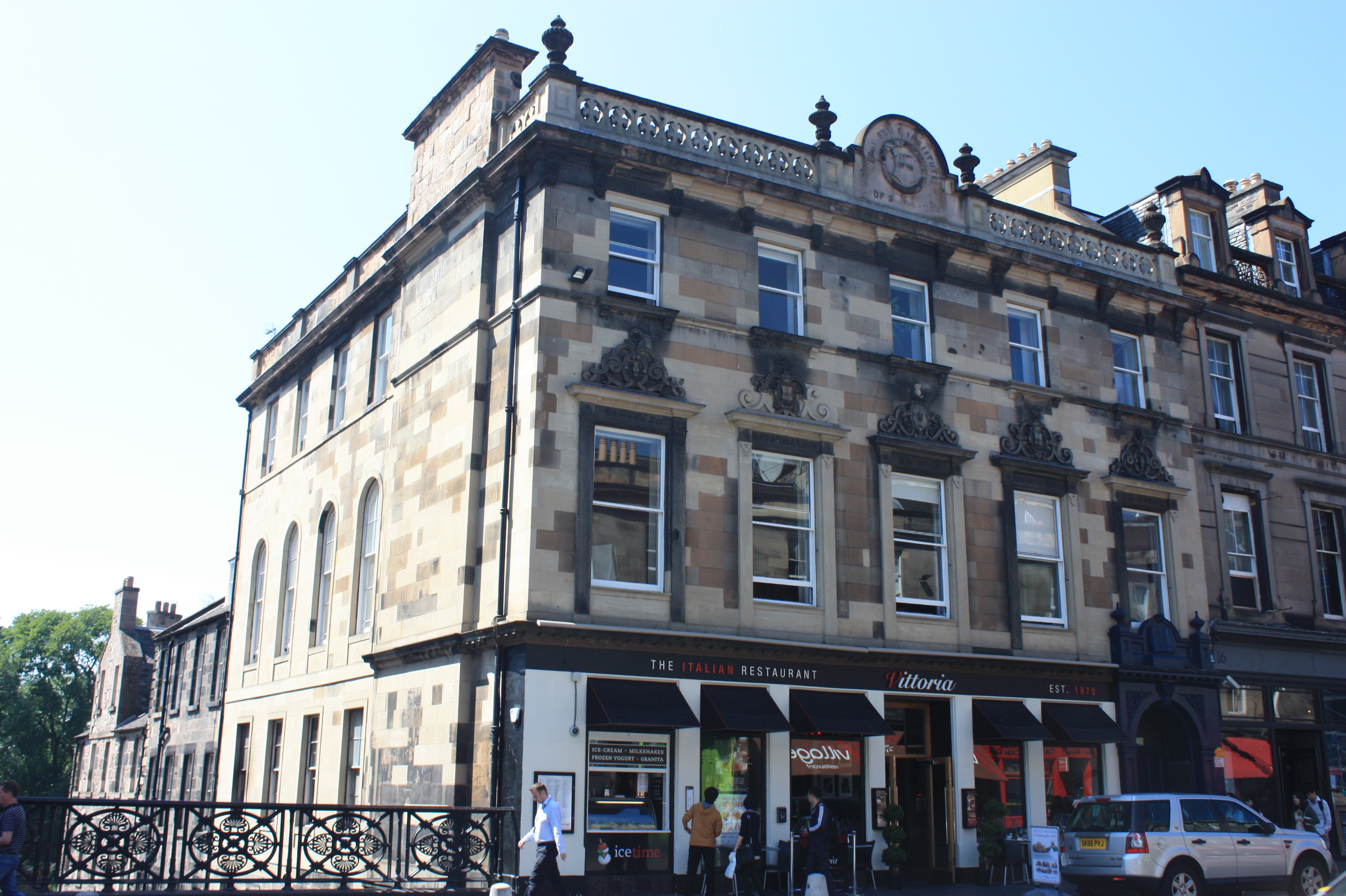
Protestant Institute, George IV Bridge, Edinburgh

Patrick Wilson (c.1798 – 6 February 1871) was a British architect with a long career spanning across the 19th century from the Georgian aesthetic to the Victorian. He was a strong advocate of purpose-built housing for the poor working closely with the Rev. Thomas Chalmers. Most of his works are in Edinburgh, the most notable of which is the first ever colony style housing in the city, the Shaw Colonies, a very innovative building form.

== Life ==
He was the son of Robert Wilson, cabinetmaker in Edinburgh. He married Catherine Peddie, daughter of the founding secretary of the Standard Life Assurance company, Edinburgh. She was a cousin of the architect John Dick Peddie. Their son Robert Wilson followed in his father's footsteps and also became an architect. Wilson's wife died in 1843 when their son was only eight. Wilson was then remarried to Jane Milne. He set up a practice at 2 Queen Street which his son Robert inherited on his death.

Wilson is buried in Greyfriars Kirkyard, just south of the church, with his wife, Catherine Peddie (1807–1843).

== Principal works ==
- Georgian style tenements at 1-9 Archibald Place (off Lauriston Place) (1824) (southmost block Demolished)
- Two pairs of Georgian houses,7/8 and 17/18 Hopetoun Crescent (1827) (street laid out by Robert Brown, architect)
- Caprington Castle, near Kilmarnock, reconstructed for Sir William Cunninghame (1829).
- Tolbooth School, Ramsay Lane (facing Ramsay Gardens) (1837)
- Elmbank Crescent, Glasgow (1838)
- Dalmellington Parish Church, Ayrshire (1845)
- Pilrig Model Dwellings, known as the "Shaw Colonies", off Leith Walk (1847–49)
- Fountainbridge Free Church (1854)
- Chalmers Buildings, Fountainbridge (1854)
- United Presbyterian Church, South College Street (1856)
- Cowgate Free Church, now converted to Wilkie House Theatre (1859)
- Burntisland Free Church (1860)
- Protestant Institute, 17/19 George IV Bridge (1860)
- Chalmers Working Men's Hall, Fountainbridge (1863)
- Chalmers Memorial Free Church (now St. Catherine's Argyle) (1865) (spire never built)
