= Broughton, Edinburgh =

Area of Edinburgh, Scotland

Coordinates: 55°57′28.97″N 3°11′18.19″W

Broughton
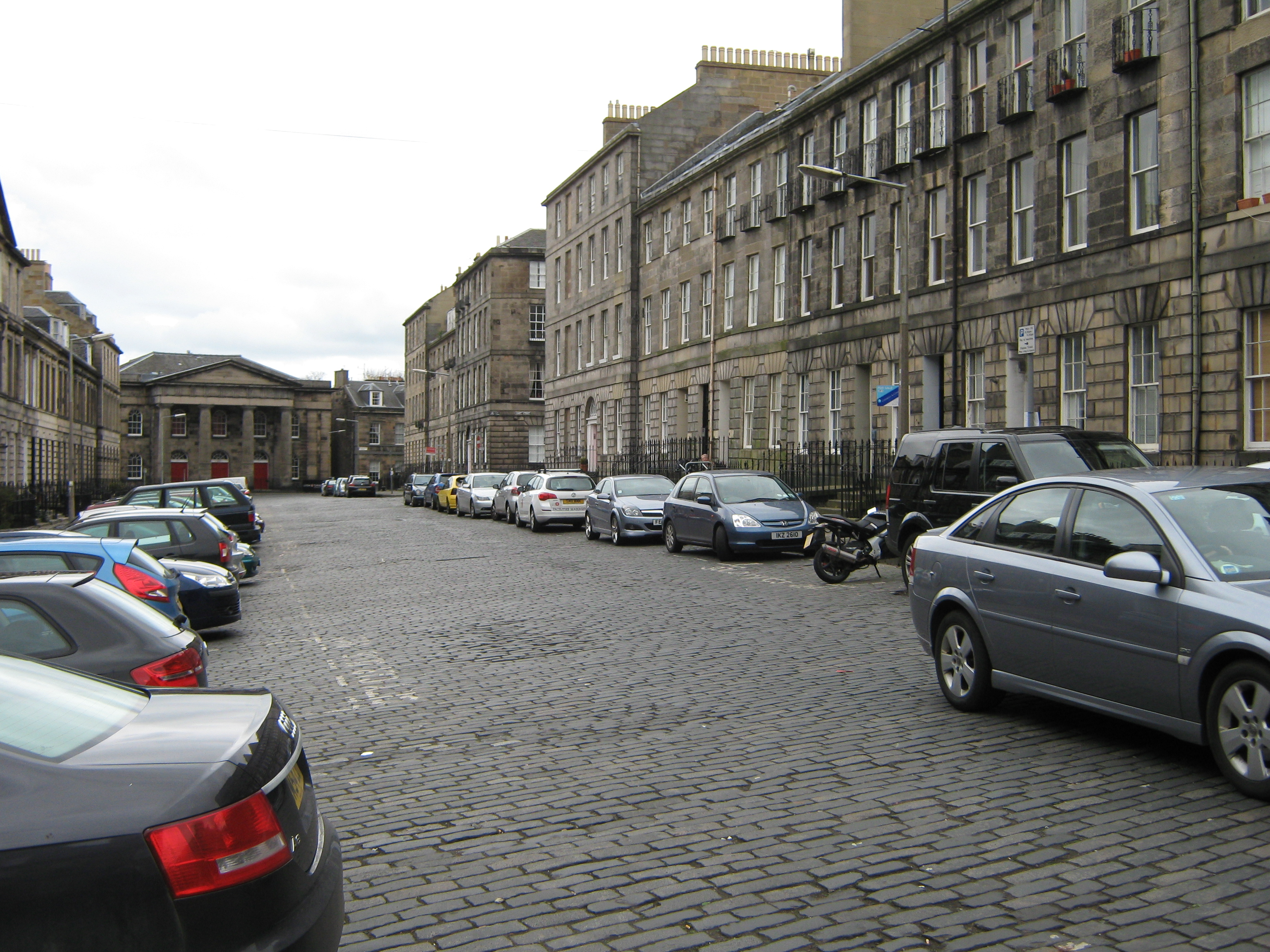
- Broughton Place

- Location within the City of Edinburgh council area Location within Scotland
- Council area: City of Edinburgh
- Country: Scotland
- Sovereign state: United Kingdom
- Post town: Edinburgh
- Postcode district: EH1
- Dialling code: 0131 (558)
- Police: Scotland
- Fire: Scottish
- Ambulance: Scottish
- UK Parliament: Edinburgh Central
- Scottish Parliament: Edinburgh Central

Broughton (/ˈbroʊtən/) is an area of Edinburgh, Scotland. Broughton was an ancient feudal barony that existed outside of Edinburgh before it was later incorporated into the city as urban development took place in the 18th and 19th centuries. The area is mostly residential in nature but includes the former Broughton market. Today there are numerous small businesses as well as several listed church buildings, a gallery and some organisations, including the Edinburgh Museums collection centre and the Scottish Historic Buildings Trust (the Glasite meeting house).

== Ancient barony ==
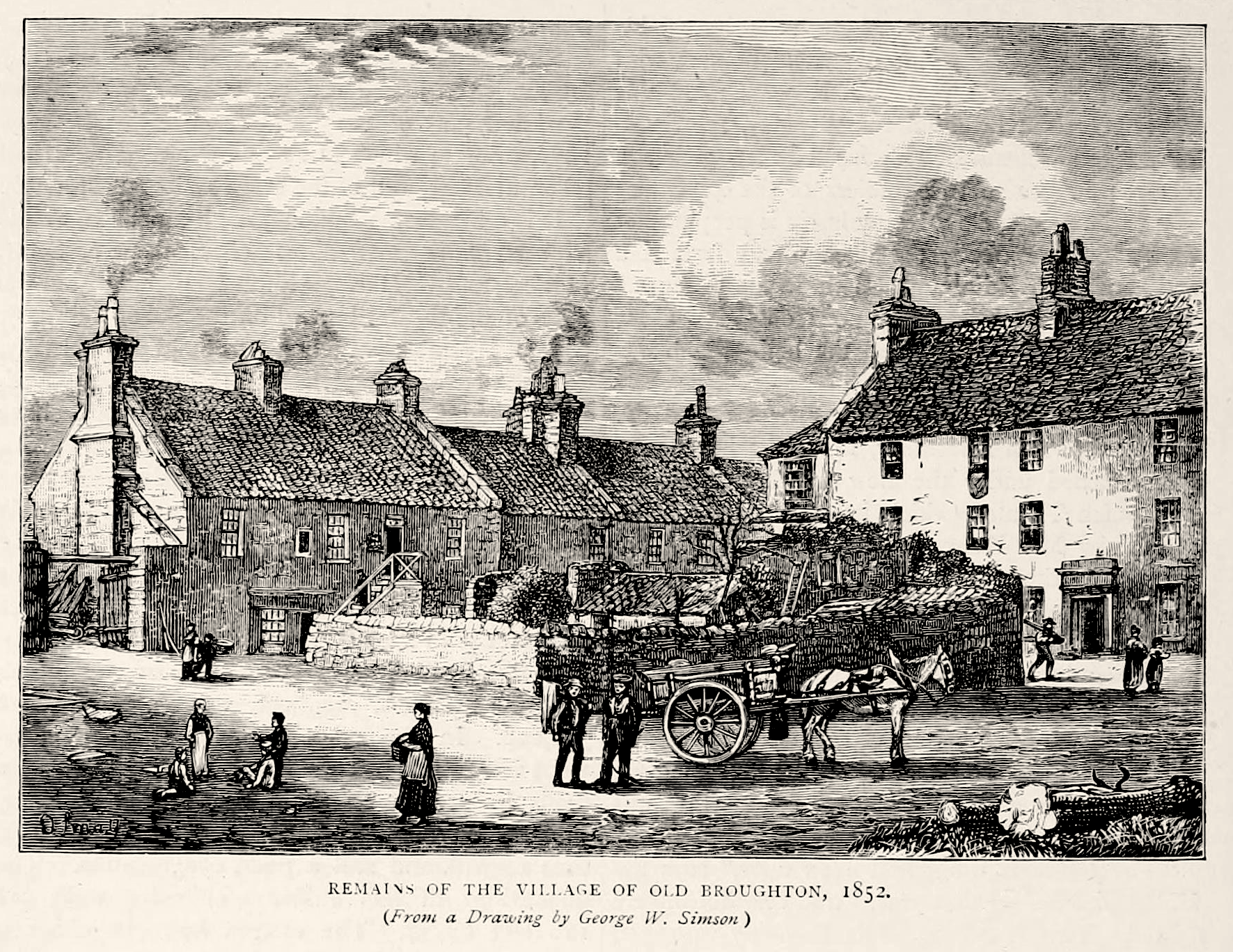
The village of Broughton in 1852

The feudal barony of Broughton in the 16th and 17th centuries was in the hands of the Bellenden family, who had made their money in the legal profession. Sir John Bellenden of Broughton, Knt., (d. 1 October 1576) who was present at the Coronation of King James VI in 1567, possessed the barony of Broughton, with the additional superiorities of the Canongate and North Leith, having therein nearly two thousand vassals, according to Sir John Scott of Scotstarvit, writing in 1754. Broughton passed to his son, Sir Lewis Bellenden, Knt., (d. 27 August 1591) Lord Justice-Clerk and a Lord of Session, who is cited as one of the Ruthven Raiders and ultimately to William Bellenden, 1st Lord Bellenden of Broughton (d. 6 September 1671).

The area was once known for its witchcraft.

== Development ==
Scattered houses on the farmlands which originally made up Broughton eventually gave way to more general housing in the century prior to the formation of Edinburgh's New Town which adjoined the parish of Broughton. Its modern borders are defined, approximately, as being Leith Walk in the south east, Broughton Street in the south west, Broughton Road in the north west and McDonald Road in the north east. Moving clockwise from south east, Broughton is bordered by Greenside and Calton, the New Town, Canonmills, and Pilrig.

=== Broughton Street ===
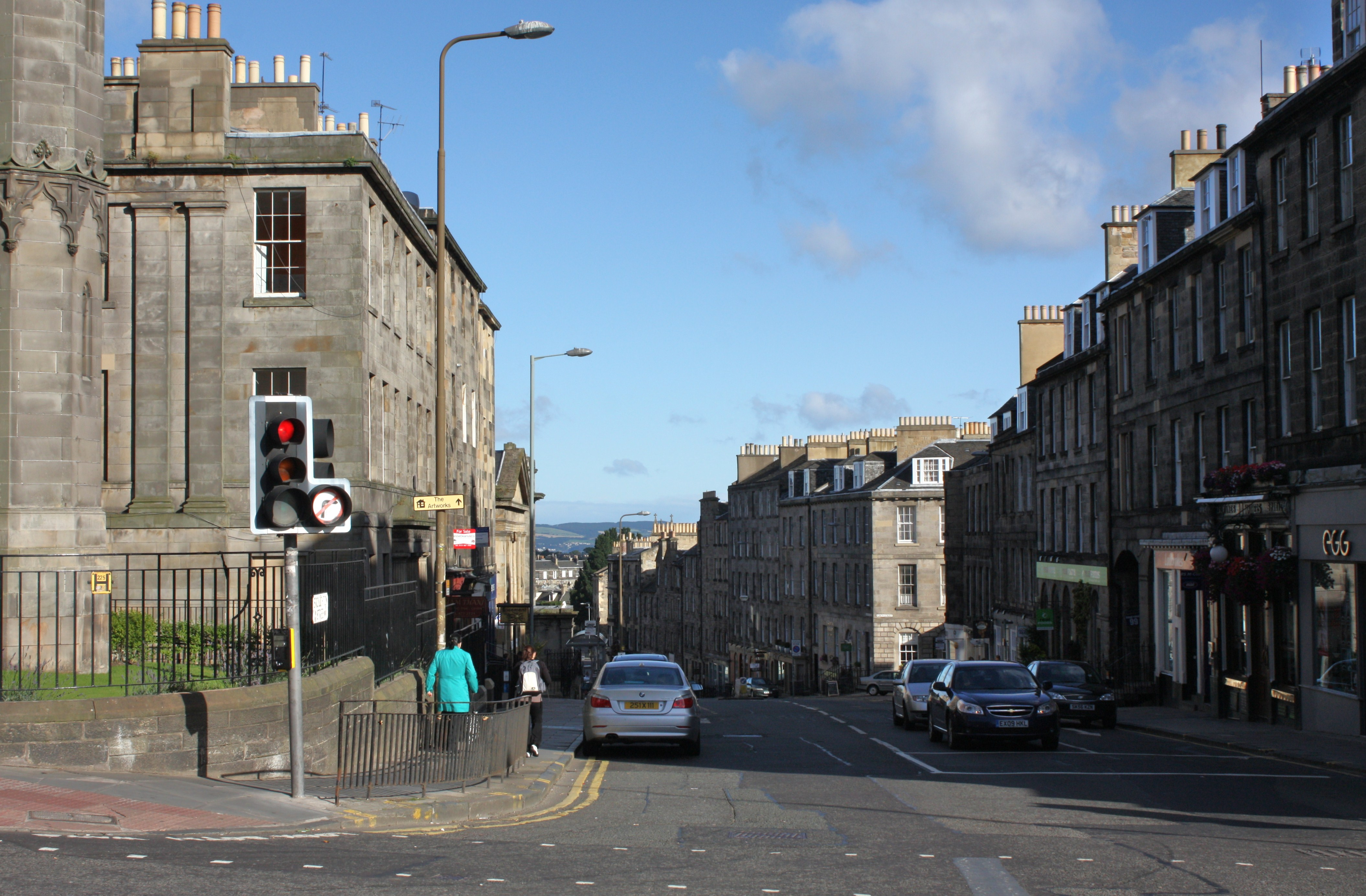
View north down Broughton Street, with the coast of Fife visible in the distance, over the Firth of Forth

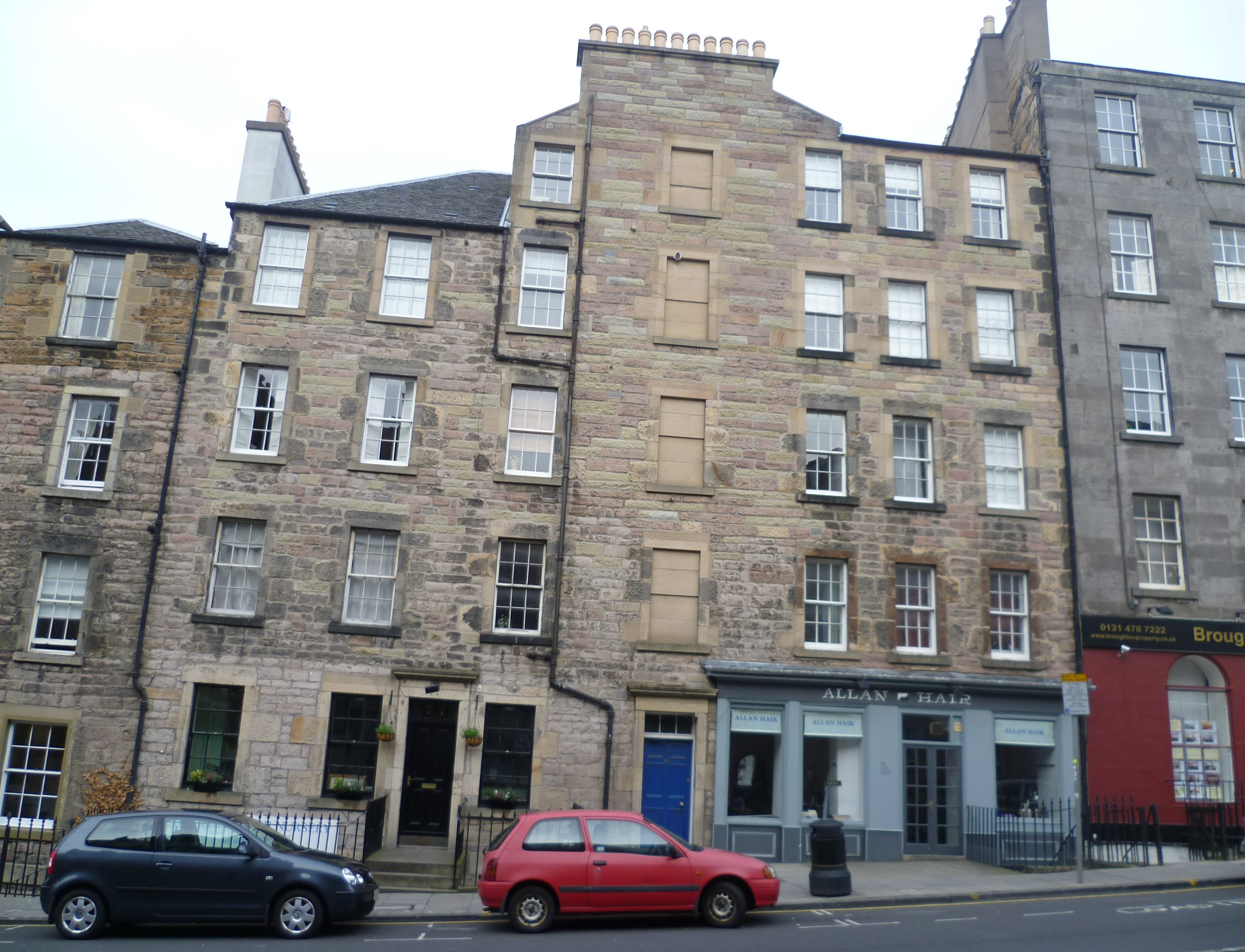
Tenements in Broughton Street

Broughton's main thoroughfare is Broughton Street. The street has many independent speciality shops. Broughton is today at the centre of Edinburgh's "pink triangle", an area of the city with a number of gay bars and clubs.

Edinburgh's first traffic lights were installed at the junction of Broughton Street and York Place in 1928. The Scottish folk band Silly Wizard were based for some time in a flat located at 69 Broughton Street. Phil Cunningham, member of Silly Wizard and younger brother of the band's founder, Johnny Cunningham, lived in Broughton.

Edinburgh's biggest health food store, Real Foods, has traded on Broughton Street since 1976 when it opened within a former drapers shop. The shop sells natural and organic food, with its goods being completely vegetarian or vegan.

The Broughton Spurtle: Broughton's Free Independent Stirrer is a community newspaper for Broughton and adjacent areas in north-east and central Edinburgh . It has been running since February 1994 and has no political, religious or commercial affiliation. It reports hyperlocally relevant political, planning, environment, transport, licensing, cultural, historic and plain odd stories, and tries to be equally rude to all sides without fear or favour especially during elections. Generally speaking, it does not see eye to eye with the Edinburgh Evening News.

=== Royal Botanic Garden Edinburgh ===
In 1763, the Edinburgh botanic garden moved away from the city's pollution, from St. Anne's Yard, near Holyrood Palace, to a larger plot in then open fields between the city and its port, Leith, to the west of the main thoroughfare, Leith Walk, under the direction of Prof John Hope.

After sixty years, in the early 1820s under the direction of new Curator, William McNab, the garden moved to its present location, in Inverleith.

=== Gayfield House ===
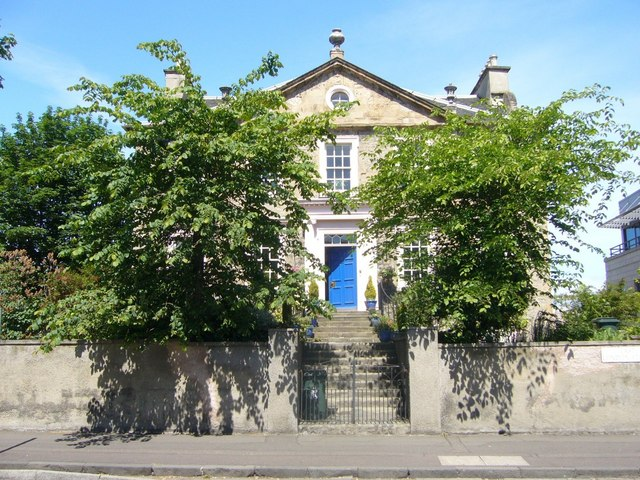
Gayfield House

Gayfield House is a Category A listed building at 18 East London Street, Edinburgh. Father and son builders Charles and William Butler built Gayfield House between 1761 and 1764 as a stylish country villa combining Scots Palladian with Dutch details and a touch of French decor, within walking distance of the crowded Old Town of Edinburgh. In 1765 the Butlers sold it for £2,000 to Thomas, Lord Erskine (the eldest son of the Earl of Mar who had led the Jacobite rising of 1715) and his wife Lady Charlotte Hope. In 1767, after Lord Erskine's death it was sold to the David Leslie, 6th Earl of Leven. An entry in the Scots Magazine in 1766 states: "Marriage. June 10th. At Gayfield, near Edinburgh, the Earl of Hopetoun to Lady Betty Leven."

A late 18th century print shows Gayfield House standing in attractive grounds, surrounded by fields and by orchards, bounded to the South East by Leith Walk. The fortunes of the house gradually declined in the 19th century as Edinburgh expanded. Loss of garden ground and the ever-approaching tenements around made it less attractive as a private house. In 1873, it was sold to William Williams as Edinburgh's New Veterinary College. This closed in 1904 and it was then bought by a merchant who stored manure in the downstairs rooms. After World War 1 it was used as a laundry which also manufactured ammonia and bleach. In the 1970s it was used as a garage and for car repairs, a hole was opened in its facade and the basement was used as a garage. By 1990 it had fallen into disrepair, was vandalised and much was stolen including carved wood and gesso chimneypieces. A roofer Trevor Harding bought it in 1991, renovated much of it and sub-divided the interior into basement and upper floors. He sold it in 2013.

=== Gayfield Square ===
Gayfield Square Police station, which is featured in the Inspector Rebus stories written by Edinburgh-based writer Ian Rankin, is located on Gayfield Square in the south east of Broughton.

=== Broughton High School ===
Broughton High School was formerly located in Broughton, but is now located further west in Comely Bank. The Scottish poet Hugh MacDiarmid undertook part of his formal education at Broughton High. Schools still located in Broughton include Drummond Community High School, Broughton Primary School and St Marys RC Primary School.

=== Churches ===
Among the notable church buildings in the Broughton area is the former Catholic Apostolic Church (1893–1901) on Mansfield Place at the foot of Broughton Street. The building, now called the Mansfield Traquair Centre, was designed in 1893 by Robert Rowand Anderson and is noted for its rich interior decoration with murals by the Irish Arts and Crafts artist Phoebe Anna Traquair. At the top of Broughton Street on the corner of York Place stands the large Gothic Revival St Paul's and St George's Church which was built 1816-1818 by Archibald Elliot and is modelled on King's College Chapel, Cambridge. Half-way down the hill stood St Mary's Free Church, on the corner of Albany Street. This ornate Gothic building was erected 1859-60 by John Thomas Rochead and was demolished in 1985 to make way for a new office block.

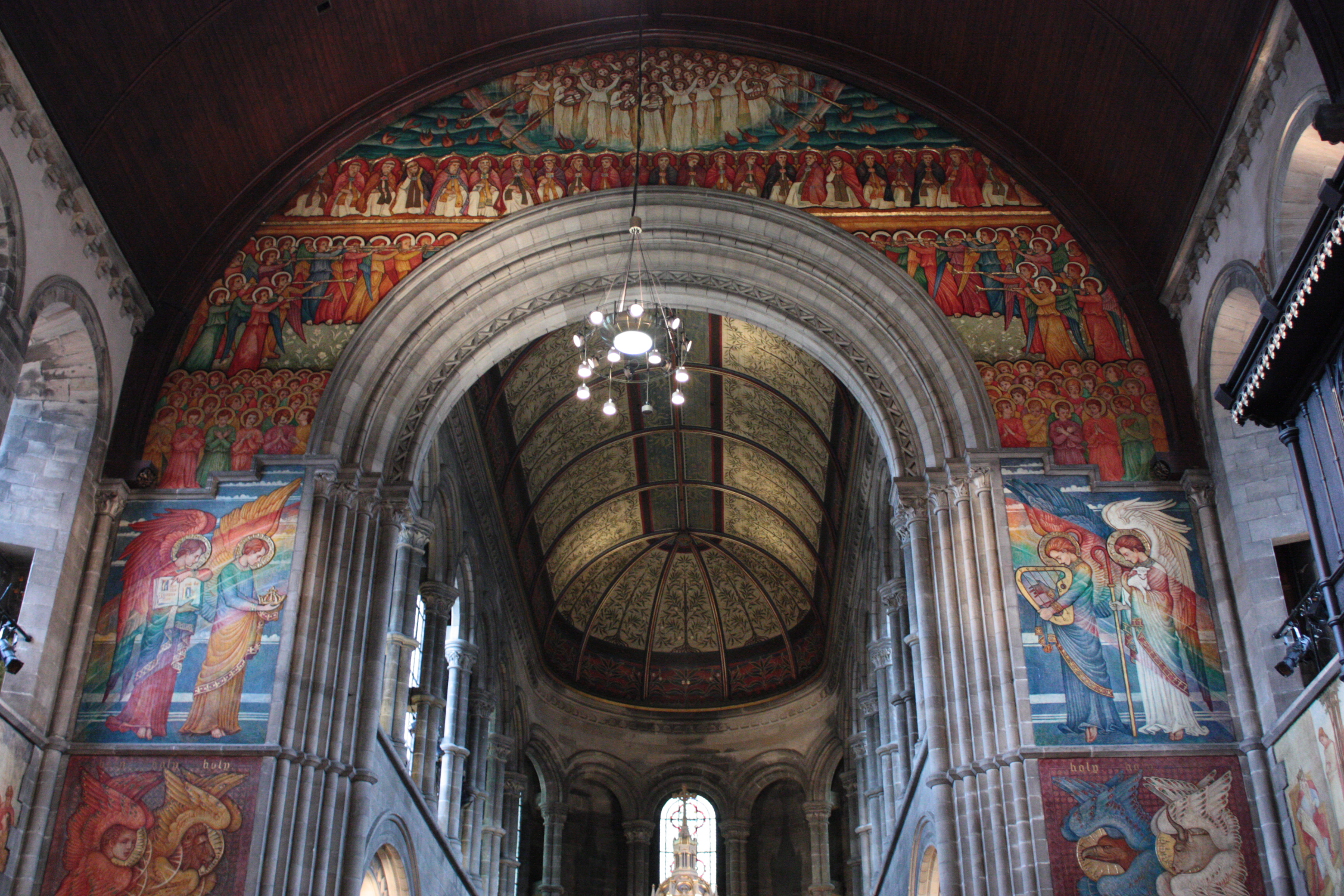
Interior of the Mansfield Place Church (1893)

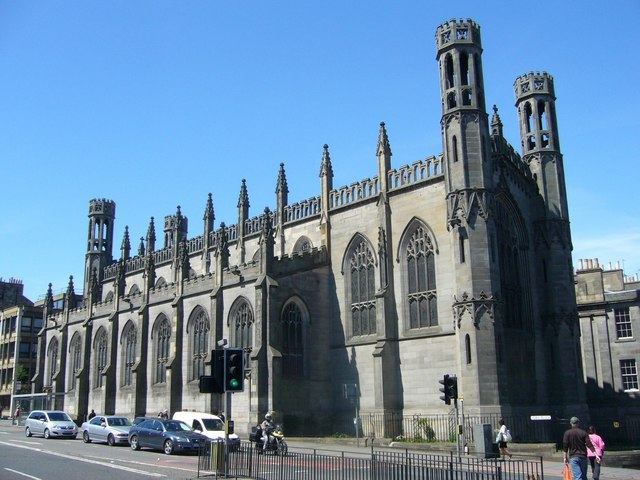
St Paul's and St George's (1818)

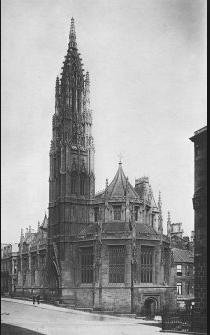
St Mary's Free Church (1860, demolished 1983)

== Transport ==
=== Buses ===
==== Lothian Buses ====
- 8 (Bellevue /Broughton Street)
- 7, 11, 14, 16, 25, 49 (Elm Row)
- 10, 11 (York Place)

=== Trams ===
The nearest tram stops are Picardy Place at the top of Broughton Street, and McDonald Road on Leith Walk.
