= Robert Wilson (architect) =

Scottish architect (1834-1901)

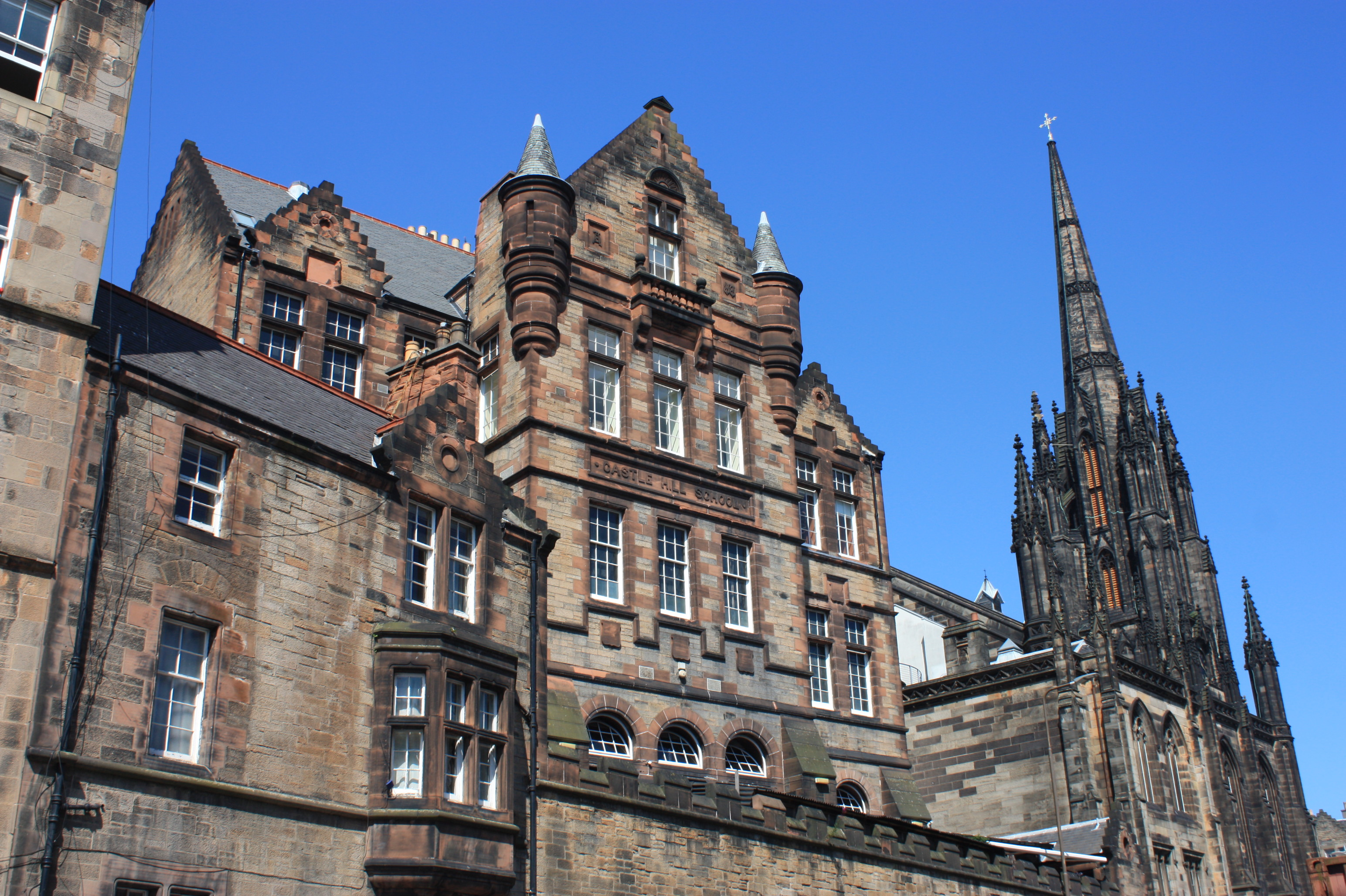
Castlehill School, Edinburgh from the south

Robert Wilson (9 September 1834 – 1 July 1901) was architect for the Edinburgh Board of Education and responsible for a high percentage of the city's schools. He is also noteworthy for involvement in several institutions aimed at improving the life of the poor and destitute in the city.

== Life ==
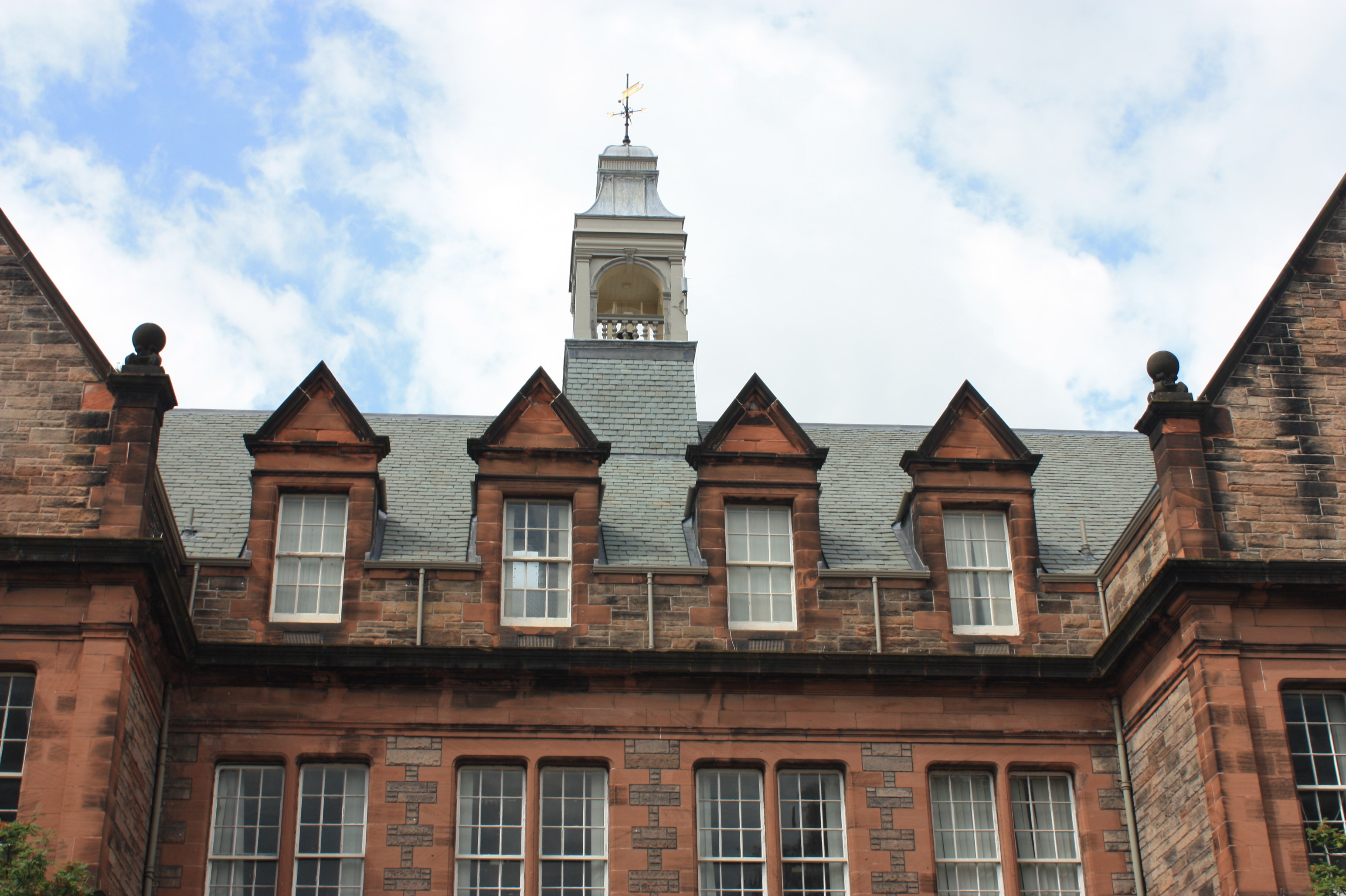
Typical Edinburgh School Board detailing by Robert Wilson, Bruntsfield School

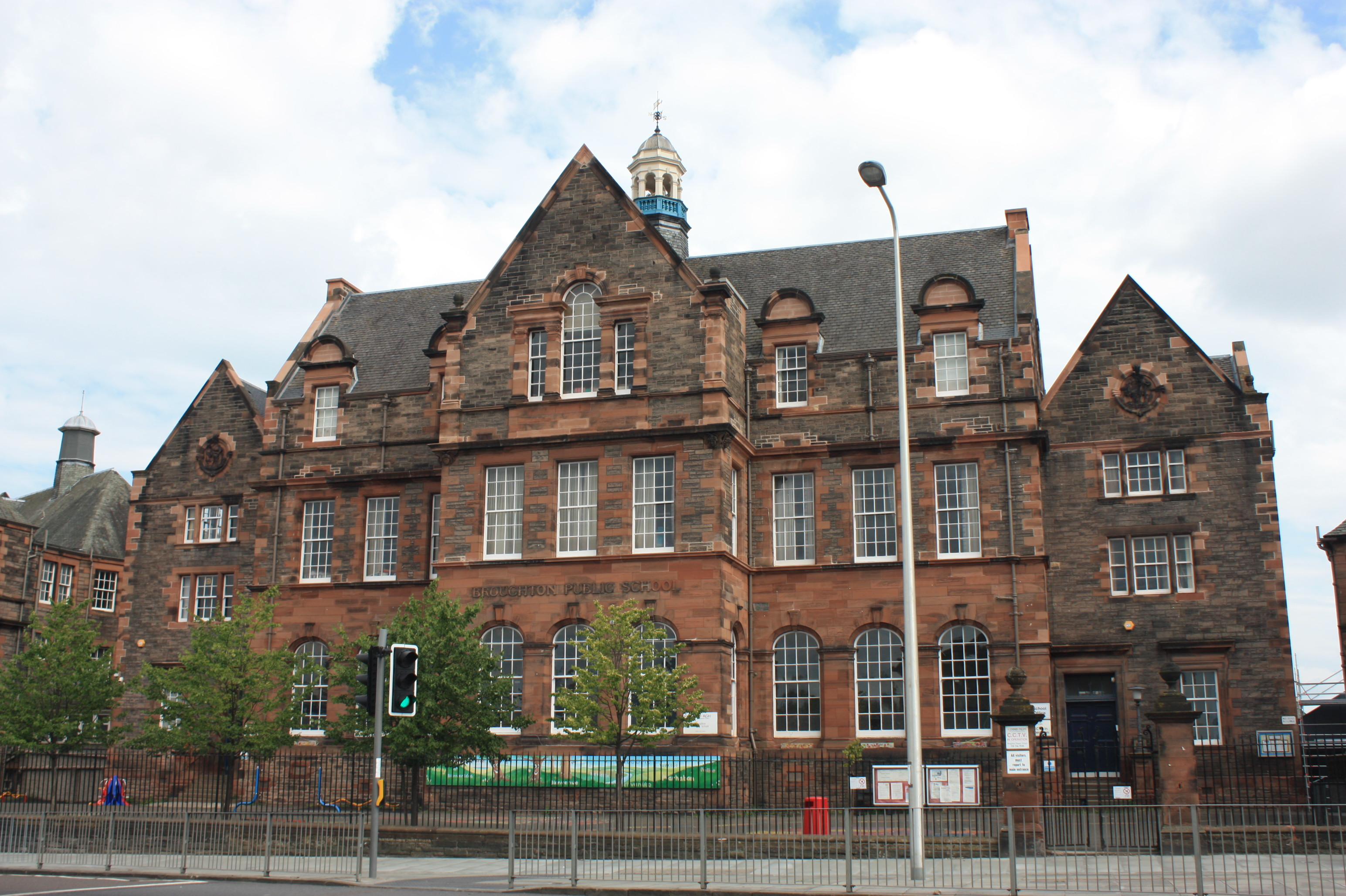
Broughton Road Primary School, Edinburgh

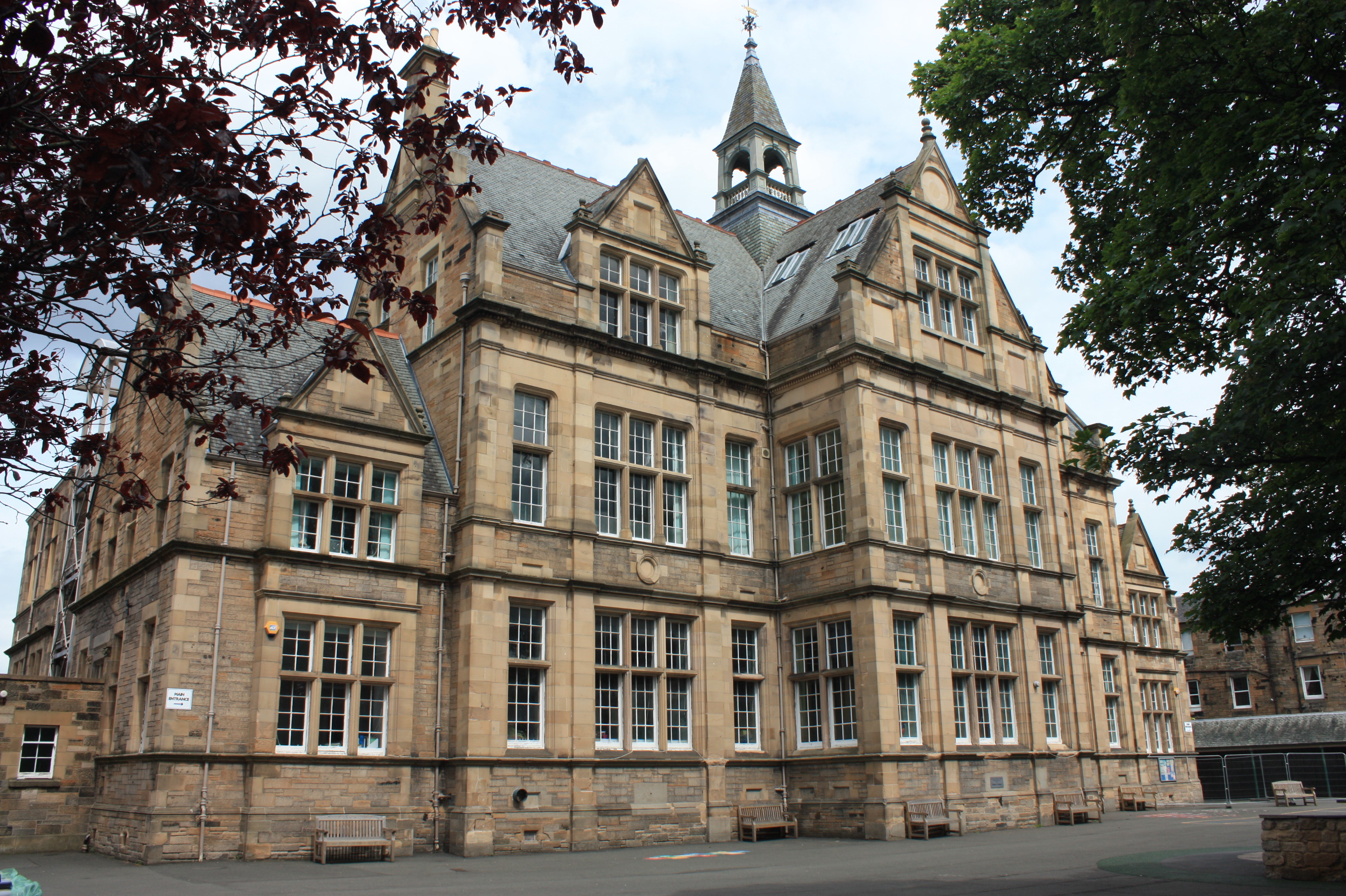
Sciennes Primary School

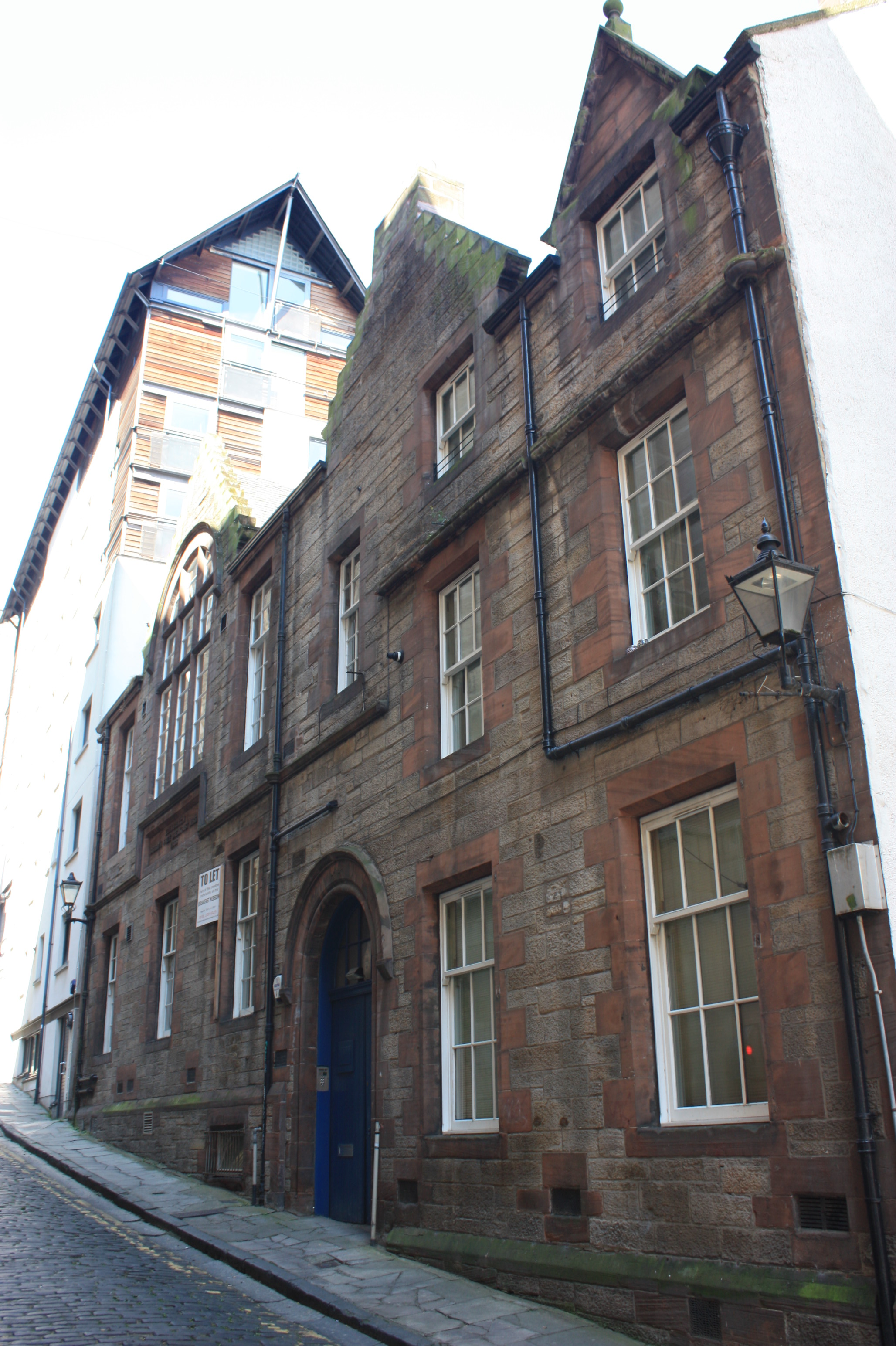
Wilson's Free Breakfast Mission, Old Fishmarket Close, Edinburgh

He was the son of Patrick Wilson (architect) and Catherine Peddie. His mother died in 1843 when Robert was only eight.

In 1849 he began working with his father at 2 Queen Street. He entered the Trustee's Academy (then on Picardy Place) in October 1850 to improve his drawing skills. He moved to London probably around 1860. In February 1871 his father died and he inherited his office and clients and he returned to Edinburgh. The office remained at 2 Queen Street. Robert then lived at 1 Craigie Terrace.

Following the Elementary Education Act 1870 (coming into force in 1872) he was entrusted with the design of all new city schools.

From 1893 he employed the highly talented John Alexander Carfrae who added yet another dimension to Edinburgh school design. Following Wilson's death in 1901, Carfrae took over this role in its entirety.

He married Isabella Gunn (d.15.8.1911) and they lived together on Blacket Place in Edinburgh. They were Baptists, and Wilson was vice-president of the Baptist Union of Scotland.

They are buried together in the Grange Cemetery on the southmost line of stones in the western extension.

== Principal Works (all in Edinburgh) ==
His philanthropic works include the design, building and operation of the Free Breakfast Mission on Fishmarket Close, and also close involvement with Carrubbers Close Mission, the Medical Mission on the Cowgate and the operation of the Destitute Sick Society.

- Dean Village School (1874)
- Cambridge Street School (1879)
- North Canongate School, now the "Canongate Venture" (1879)
- St Leonards School (1879)
- Abbeyhill School (1880)
- Clarebank School (1880)
- Villa, 5 Tipperlinn Road (1881)
- Marchmont Road School (1882)
- North Merchiston School (1882)
- Leith Baptist Church (1884)
- Edinburgh Sabbath Free Breakfast Mission, Fishmarket Close (1885)
- Granton School (1885)
- South Bridge School, Infirmary Street (1885)
- Edinburgh School Board Offices (1886)
- Milton House School and janitor's house, Canongate (1886)
- Castlehill School (1887)
- Heriot's Trust School, St Bernard's Crescent (1887)
- London Street School (1887)
- Torphichen Street School (1887)
- Sciennes School (1889)
- Reconstruction of Alnwickhill Industrial Home for Fallen Women (1890)
- Colinton Cottage Homes (original block) (1891)
- Bonaly School, Thorburn Road (now an old people's home) (1891)
- South Morningside School (1891)

After 1893 Wilson seems to have taken a back seat as regards design, and Carfrae effectively takes over long before his official appointment in the role.
