= Pharmacy and Therapeutics =

Pharmacy and Therapeutics (P&T) is a committee at a hospital or a health insurance plan that decides which drugs will appear on that entity's drug formulary. The committee usually consists of healthcare providers involved in prescribing, dispensing, and administering medications, as well as administrators who evaluate medication use. They must weigh the costs and benefits of each drug and decide which ones provide the most efficacy per dollar. This is one aspect of pharmaceutical policy. P&T committees utilize an evidence-based approach to drive change within health systems/plans by changing existing policies and bringing up-to-date research to support medical decision-making.

== Hospital responsibilities ==
The role of the Pharmacy and Therapeutics committee has evolved significantly over time, starting as a forum for discussion of drug use in hospitals. The three basic categories of issues that the committee deals with are:

1. Cost (reimbursements)
2. Quality
3. Access to care

=== Cost ===
Given the increasing numbers of specialty medications, P&T committees are expected to make decisions on whether these medications, which may not be covered, should be utilized in the clinical setting. Data on comparative effectiveness from head to head clinical trials are critical to making informed decisions for the health system.

=== Quality ===
The P&T committee is in charge of deciphering clinical trials and generating drug monographs to ensure that the selected medications are utilized effectively. When considering novel therapies, the committee uses drugs currently on formulary that treat the same disease state to determine the efficacy of the new therapy. The committee is also involved in addressing and reviewing severity of adverse events with associated agents.

== Members of the P&T committee ==
The Pharmacy and Therapeutics committee is multidisciplinary and composed of healthcare providers who are involved in the use of medications, and they are responsible for determining the drug formulary of their institution. The committee may include physicians and midlevel providers from a variety of specialties, as well as administrators and quality assurance staff. Members are expected to be capable of conducting study design, evaluating scientific articles, and providing professional insight to support the decision-making process. The P&T committee typically meets regularly - for instance, quarterly - to discuss new formulary changes.

== Formulary restrictions ==
When new drugs come to market, the Pharmacy and Therapeutics committee evaluates the drug's clinical and economic benefits and drawbacks to determine whether the drug will be added to the organization's formulary. Most generic drugs are available on formularies, except in cases where a certain drug class is no longer considered safe and efficacious. Medications under formulary restrictions may be used only by specific physicians, patient care areas, or disease states.

== See also ==
- Formulary
- Pharmaceutical policy
- Health administration
- Health insurance
