= Pharmacy and Therapeutics (journal) =

- Language: English
- Edited by: David B. Nash

Publication details
- History: since 1990
- Publisher: MediMedia (United States)
- Frequency: monthly

Standard abbreviations
- ISO 4: Pharm. Ther.

Indexing
- CODEN: PPTTEK
- ISSN: 1052-1372
- OCLC no.: 22095729

Pharmacy and Therapeutics (P&T) is a peer-reviewed journal of hospital formulary management. Established in 1990 by CORE Medical Journals, it has been published monthly since 2008 by MediMedia. All issues since 2008 are freely available electronically on PubMed Central after a one-month embargo. It continues in series from Hospital Therapy (1985-1990) and the earlier Drug Therapy (1976-1984).
