= Pharmaceutical Price Regulation Scheme =

The Pharmaceutical Price Regulation Scheme (PPRS) is the mechanism used by the UK Department of Health to ensure that the NHS has access to good quality branded medicines at reasonable prices. It was originally called the Voluntary Price Regulation Scheme (VPRS) and involves a non-contractual agreement between the UK Department of Health and The Association of the British Pharmaceutical Industry (ABPI). The scheme applies to all branded, licensed medicines available on the NHS. The purpose of the scheme is to achieve a balance between reasonable prices for the NHS and a fair return for the pharmaceutical industry.

The current PPRS scheme, using a value-based pricing mechanism, came into effect on 1 January 2014, to run for no less than five years. It replaced an earlier scheme running from 2009 to 2013.

In December 2014 Hoffmann-La Roche successfully appealed against a decision of the National Institute for Health and Care Excellence appraisal committee in respect of Kadcyla on the basis that it should have considered that under the scheme, the industry had agreed to cap growth in the drugs bill to 0–1.9% a year for the next five years. Roche said this had "fundamentally changed" the nature of how NICE should consider cost effectiveness.

On 23 August 2017, the UK Government launched a consultation relating to the PPRS, following legislation that was recently passed.

== Purpose and objectives ==
As the primary buyer of medicines in the UK, the Department of Health has an interest in ensuring medicines are available at reasonable prices. However it is also important that pharmaceutical companies, represented by the ABPI, are able to maintain sufficient levels of profit and competitiveness to enable them to invest in sustained research and development. The 2009 PPRS agreement outlines its primary objectives as to:

1. Deliver value for money
2. Encourage innovation
3. Promote access and uptake for new medicines
4. Provide stability, sustainability and predictability

== Patient access schemes ==
The 2009 PPRS agreement allows for patient access schemes. These allow for the provision of a drug which would not otherwise be supported by NICE and available on the NHS due to insufficient evidence of its cost-effectiveness. Patient access schemes can be either financially based or outcome-based. Financially based schemes are where the company does not alter the list price of the drug but offers discounts or rebates linked to numbers or types of patients treated, response of patients treated, or the number of doses required. Or, alternatively, the company may alter the list price. Outcome-based schemes take place when a company agrees to a later increase in price, or a rebate, once the value of the drug has been proven. Alternatively risk-sharing agreements can be put in place whereby outcomes are measured and price adjustments take place accordingly.
