= John Alexander Carfrae =

Scottish architect

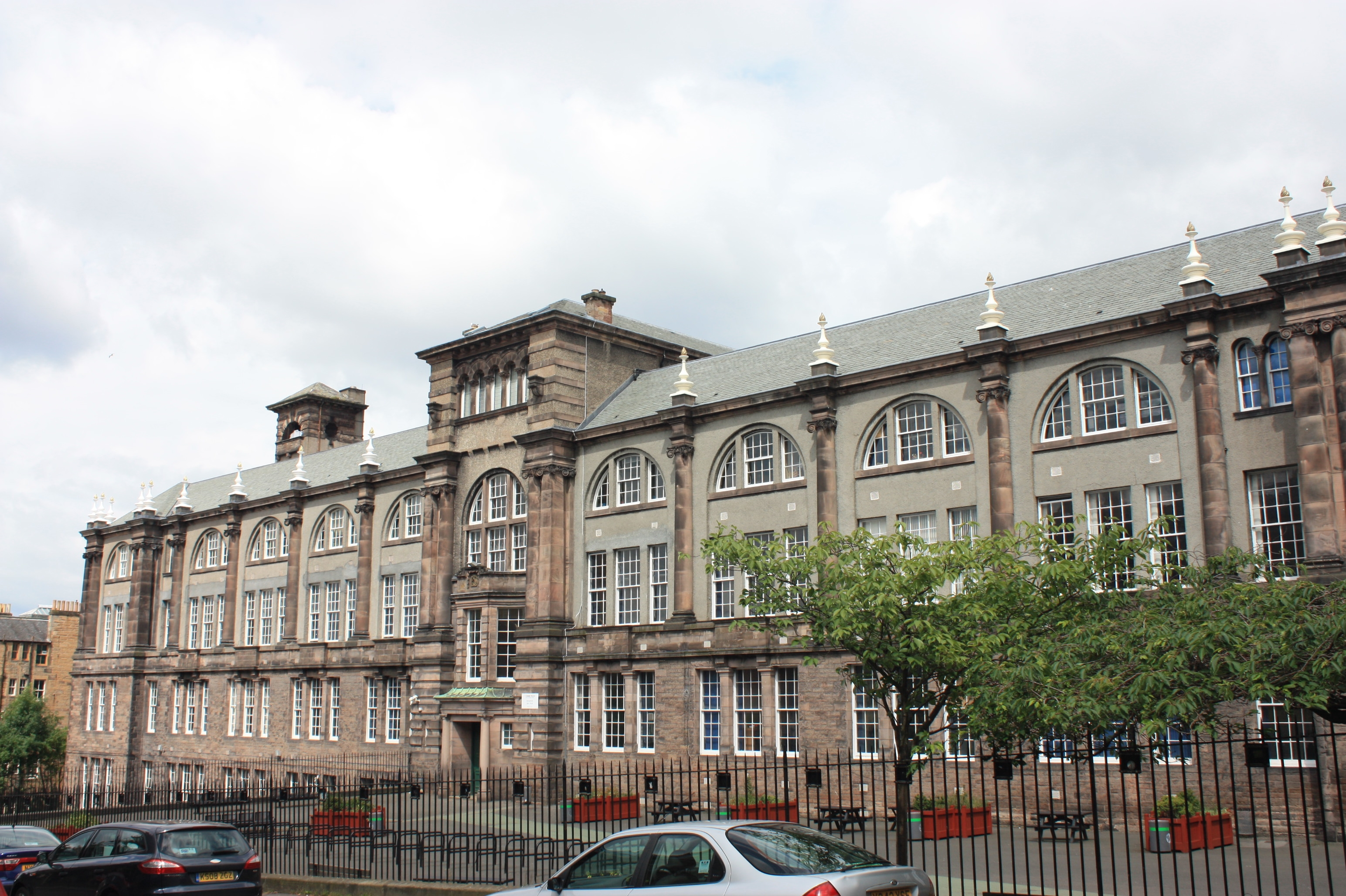
Boroughmuir High School

John Alexander Carfrae (1868–1947) was a Scottish architect of particular note in the field of innovative school design. He was considered one of the best architects of his generation, but his works were rather limited as he was constrained to the standard board school formats.

== Life ==
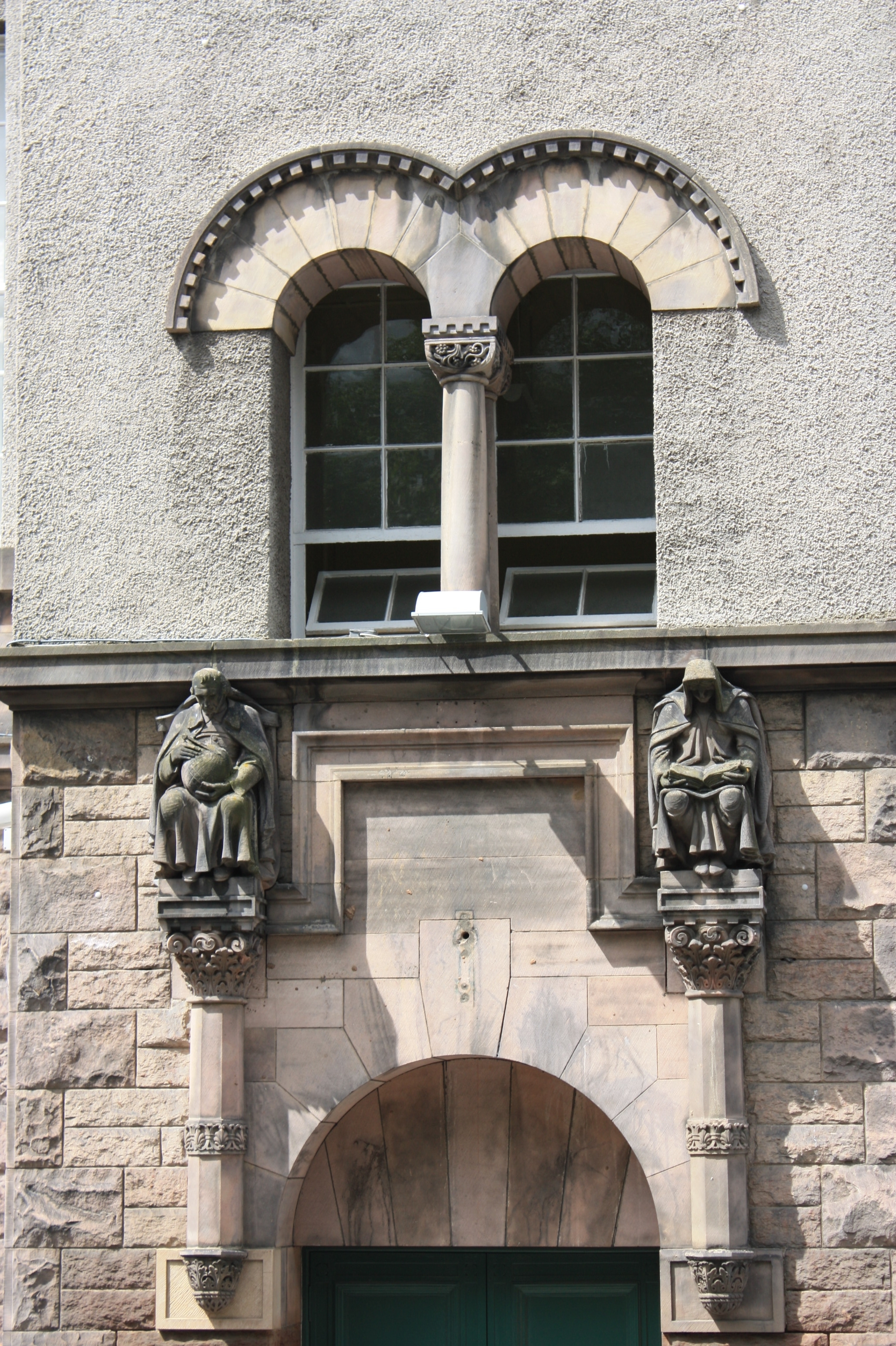
Boroughmuir High School south door

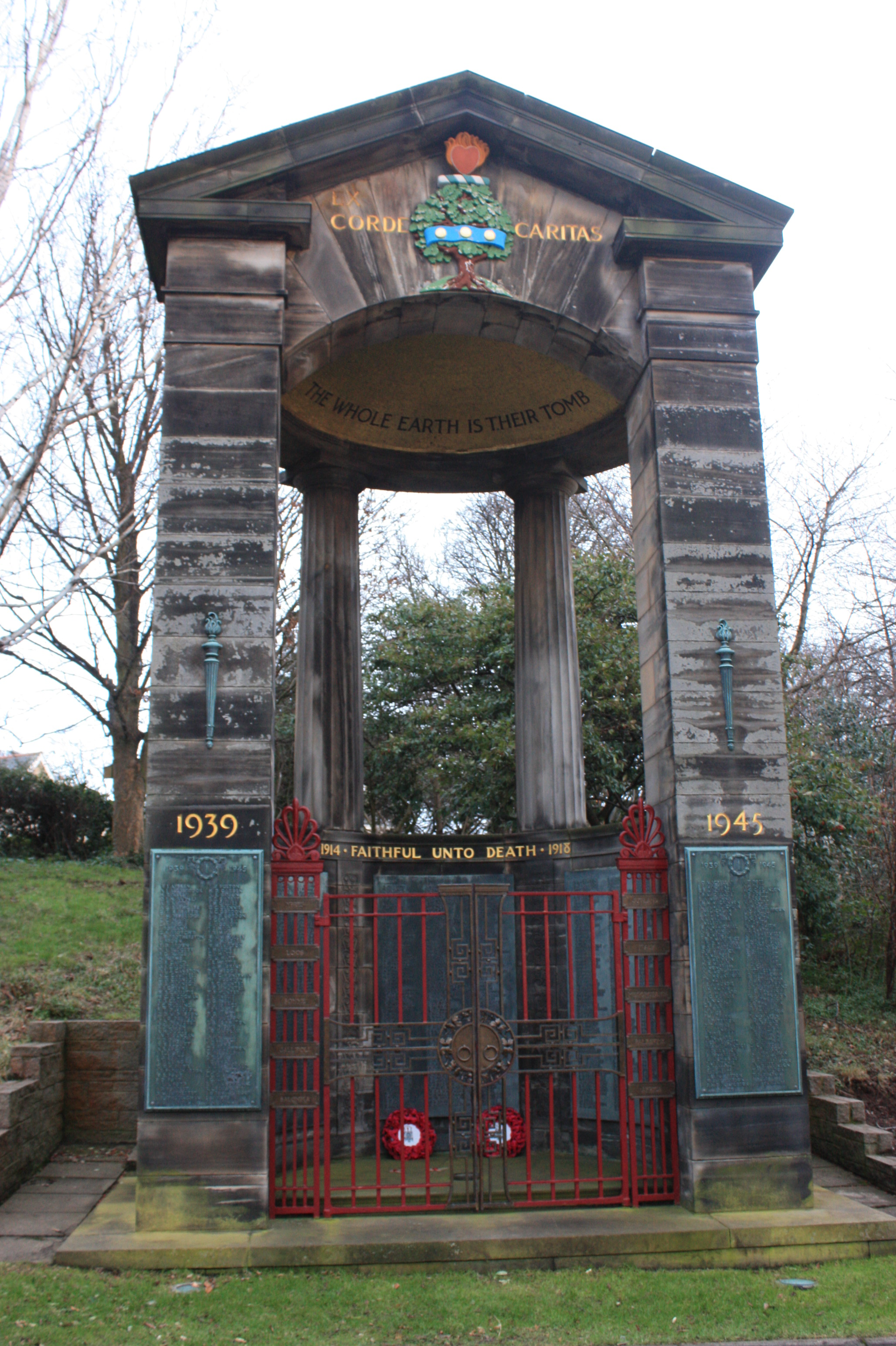
George Watsons War Memorial by J. A. Carfrae

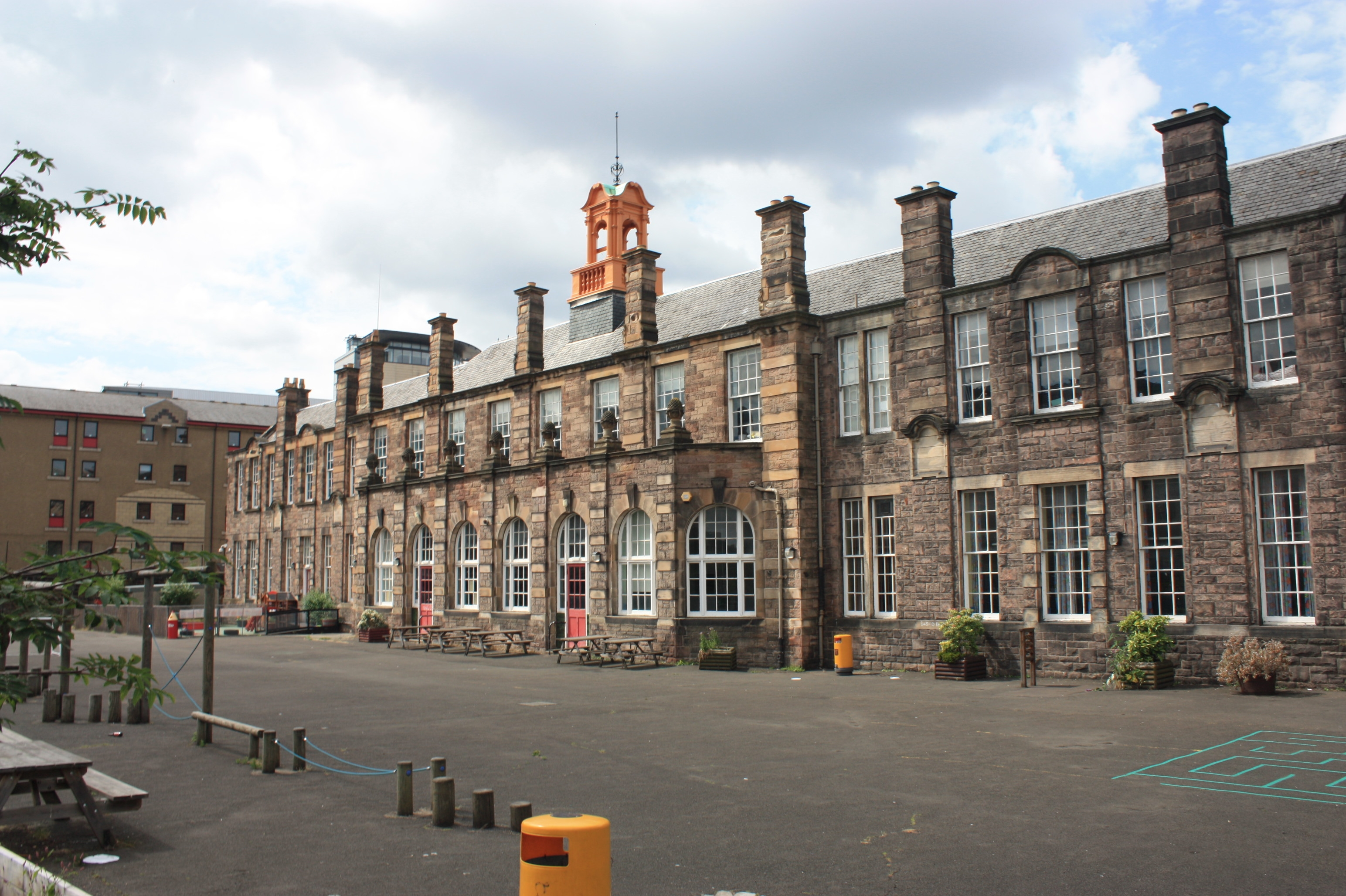
Tollcross School, Edinburgh

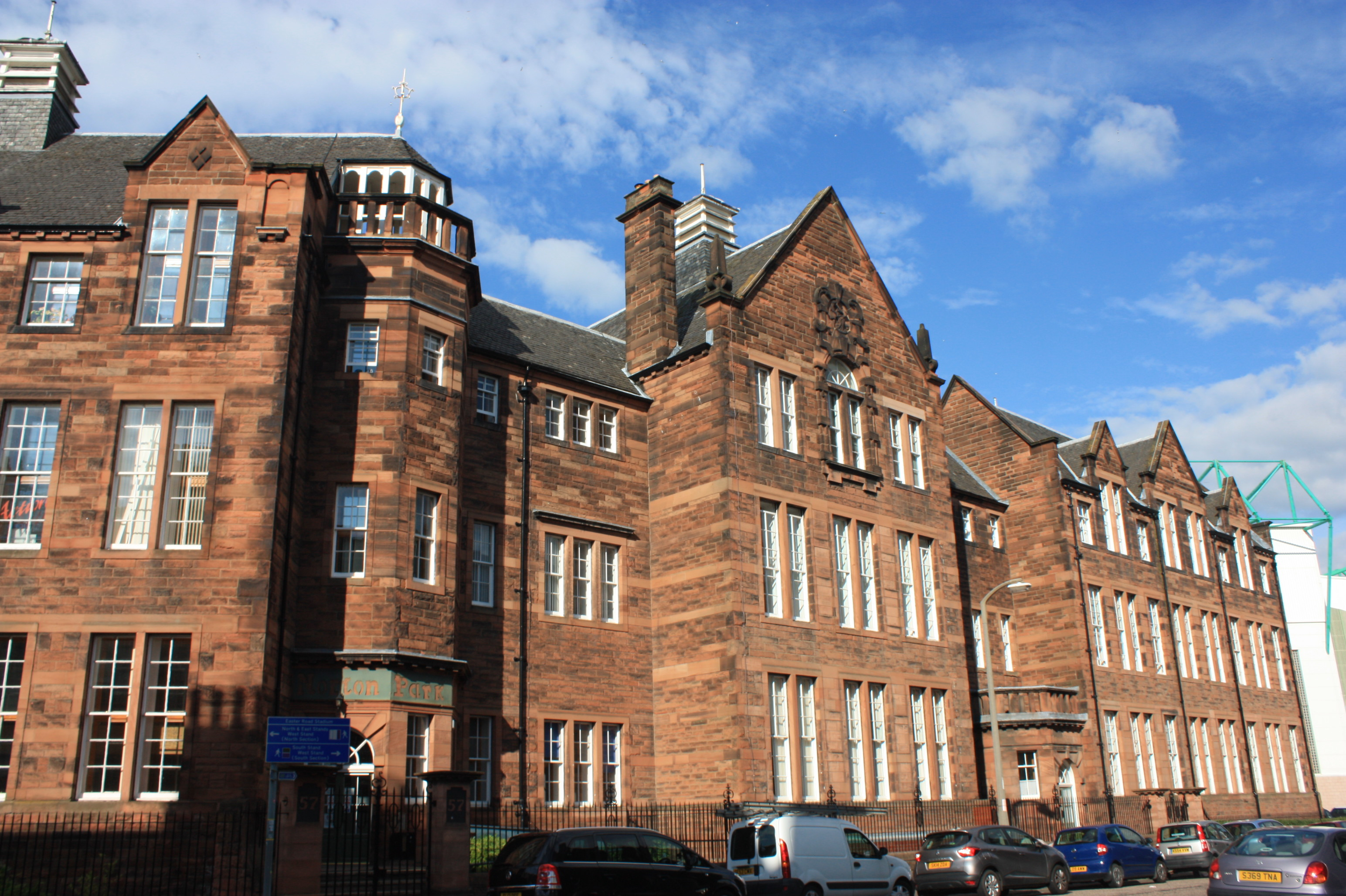
Albion Road School, Edinburgh

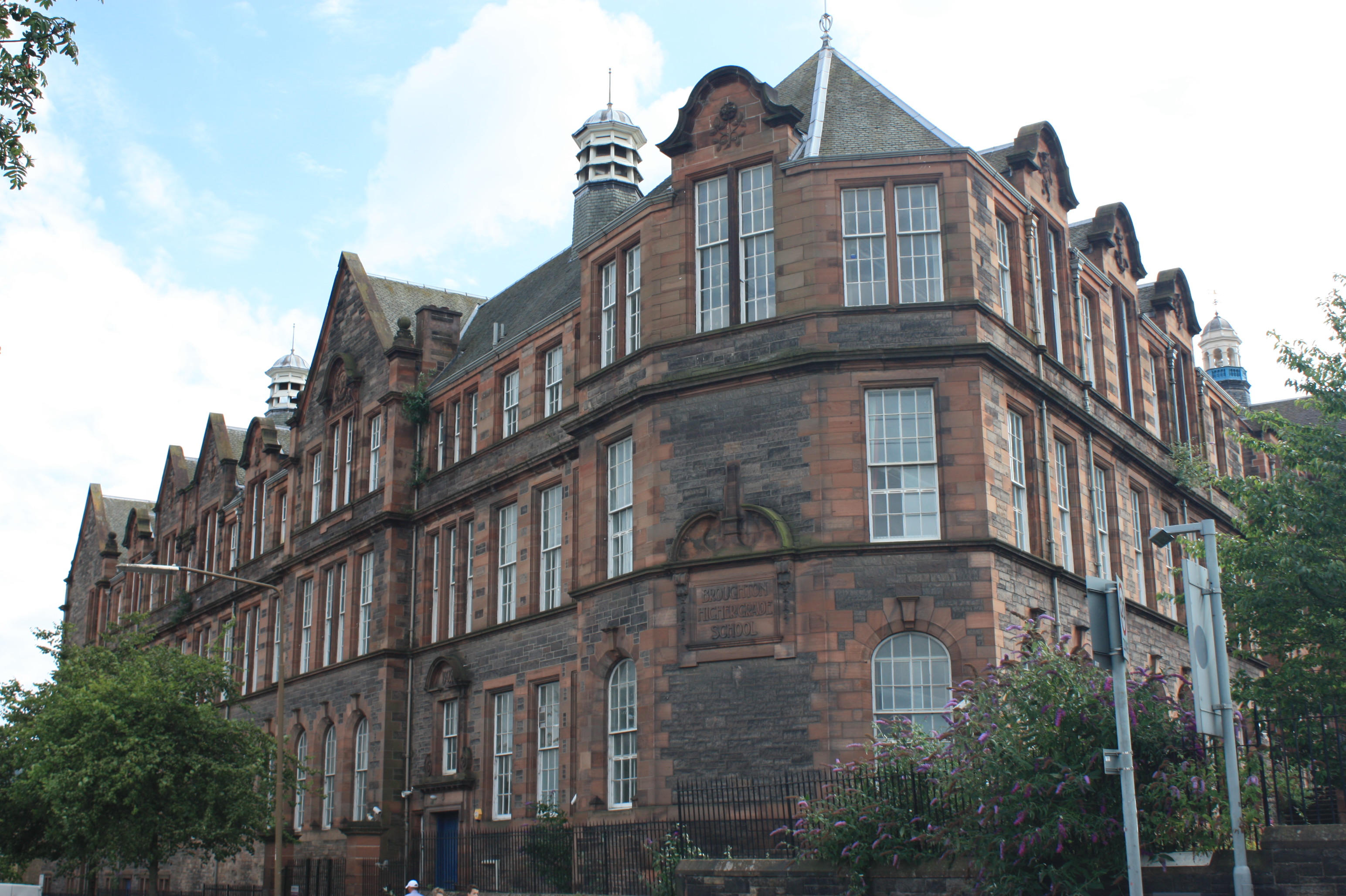
Broughton Primary School, McDonald Road Building

Born in Edinburgh the son of Thomas Carfrae, a civil engineer. He was the younger brother of George Somervil Carfae, also a civil engineer. The family lived at 9 Osborne Terrace in Edinburgh's West End. He was educated at James Gillespie's High School.

Carfrae was articled in 1881 to Robert Wilson, architect for the Edinburgh School Board. In 1889 he moved to London to be an assistant to Arthur Cawston, but transferred to HM Office of Works to work under Henry Tanner. In June 1892 Carfrae returned to Edinburgh to work in Sydney Mitchell and Robert Wilson's practice. Six months later, Carfrae became Wilson's principal assistant and he took over most design work.

When Robert Wilson died in 1901, Carfrae inherited both his office and the full role as architect to the Edinburgh School Board. In 1918 local government practices changed, and the City Architect became responsible for school design, resulting in Carfrae losing his practice. However, the city architect Ebenezer James MacRae still passed him two commissions: for Balgreen and Stenhouse schools.

From 1907 until death he lived in Polwarth, Edinburgh, at 3 Gillsland Road. He lived here with his wife, Augusta Wilkes Henderson, and their two sons. Carfrae retired completely in 1939. He died on 11 July 1947.

== Works ==
Carfrae worked largely for the Edinburgh School Board. Even before he completely took control of this design function, his style is clear, acting as Chief Assistant within the office.

- Bruntsfield Primary School, Montpelier, Edinburgh (1893–5)
- Gilmore Place Public School, later Darroch Secondary and now James Gillespie's High School Darroch Annexe, Upper Gilmore Place, Edinburgh (1895)
- Villas, 18,20 Inverleith Place, Edinburgh (1897) (uncharacteristically plain)
- Flora Stevenson School, Comely Bank, Edinburgh (1899–1900)
- Craiglockhart Primary School (1901)
- Original Boroughmuir Higher Grade School, Warrender Park Crescent, Edinburgh (1902)
- Original Broughton Higher Grade School, McDonald Road, Edinburgh (1903)
- Albion Road School, later Norton Park Secondary and an annexe of Leith Academy (1903)
- Office, 5 St Andrew Square, Edinburgh (1903, demolished 2014)
- Drummond Street Infant School, later St. Patrick’s R.C. Primary School, Edinburgh (1905)
- Colinton Cottage Homes (for the Church of Scotland, Aged Christian Friendly Society), Redford Road and Thorburn Road, Colinton (1906–7)
- Dirleton School (1910)
- Juniper Green Primary School (1910)
- Duncan Street Special School, Edinburgh (1910)
- Original Tynecastle Technical and Commercial School, later Tynecastle High School, Edinburgh (1910–11)
- Boroughmuir High School, Viewforth, Edinburgh (1911) (sculpture by Joseph Hayes)
- Tollcross Primary School, Edinburgh (1911)
- Remodelling of Cannonball House on the Royal Mile as a school (1913)
- King's Park School, later James Clark Secondary School and then St Thomas of Aquin's R.C. High School annexe, Edinburgh (1913)
- Newton School, West Lothian (1914)
- School War Memorial, George Watson’s College (1920)
- Bellevue Technical School, later Drummond Community High School, Edinburgh (1923)
- Hawick High School (1926)
- Stenhouse Primary School, Edinburgh (1929)
- Balgreen Primary School, Edinburgh (1930)
