= King's Church (disambiguation) =

King's Church is the name of:

- King's Church in Edinburgh
- King's Church London in Catford, London
- King's Church Selby in North Yorkshire, England
