= Thomas McLauchlan =

Free Church of Scotland minister and Gaelic author (1815–1886)

Thomas McLauchlan (1815–1886) was a Scottish minister and theological author who served as Moderator of the General Assembly for the Free Church of Scotland 1876/77.

He was one of the first to promote Gaelic as an academic language. In 1859, he fuelled the fire of the Ossian debate by producing the "Gaelic originals" of the poem.

== Life ==
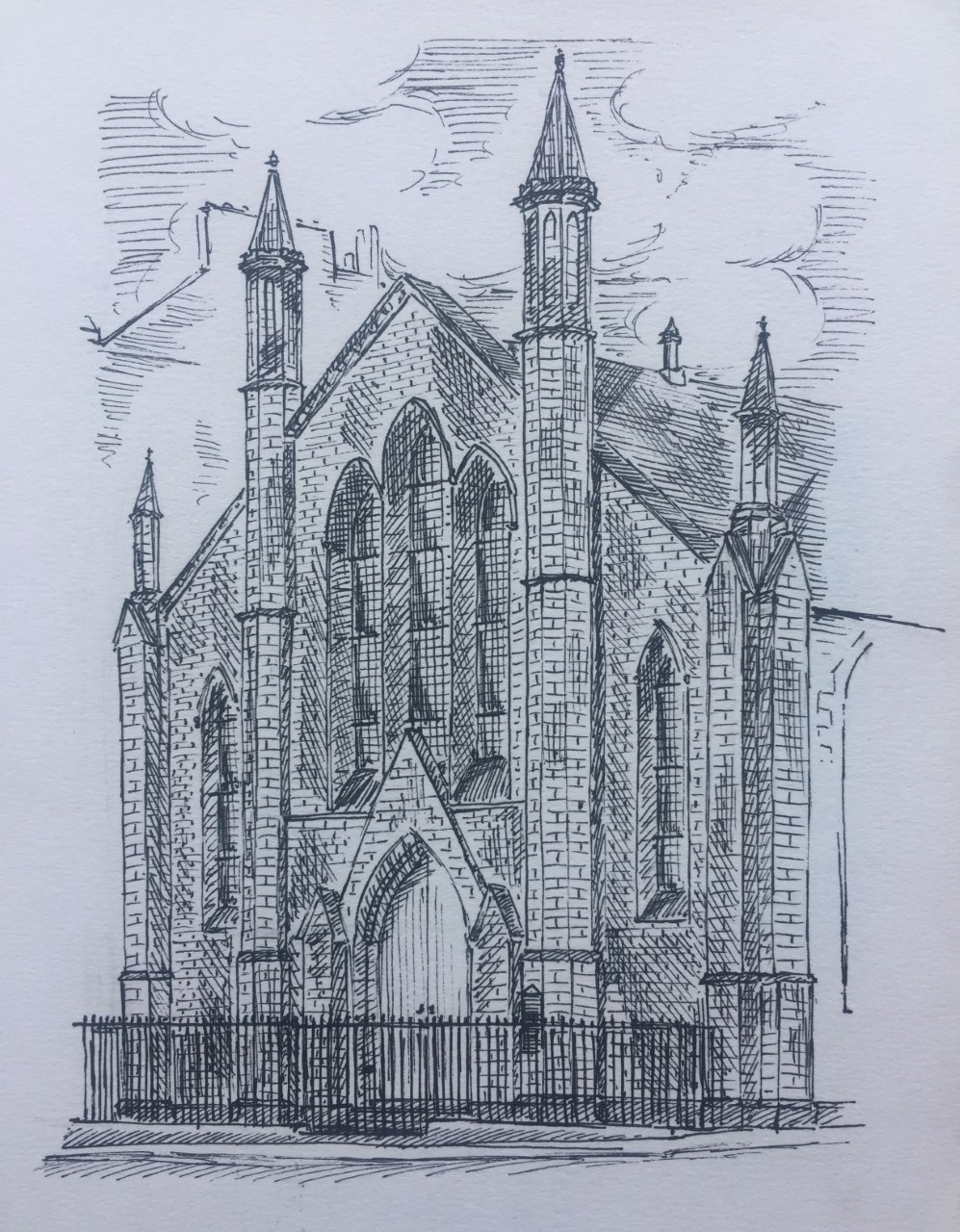
St Columba's Gaelic Free Church, Edinburgh

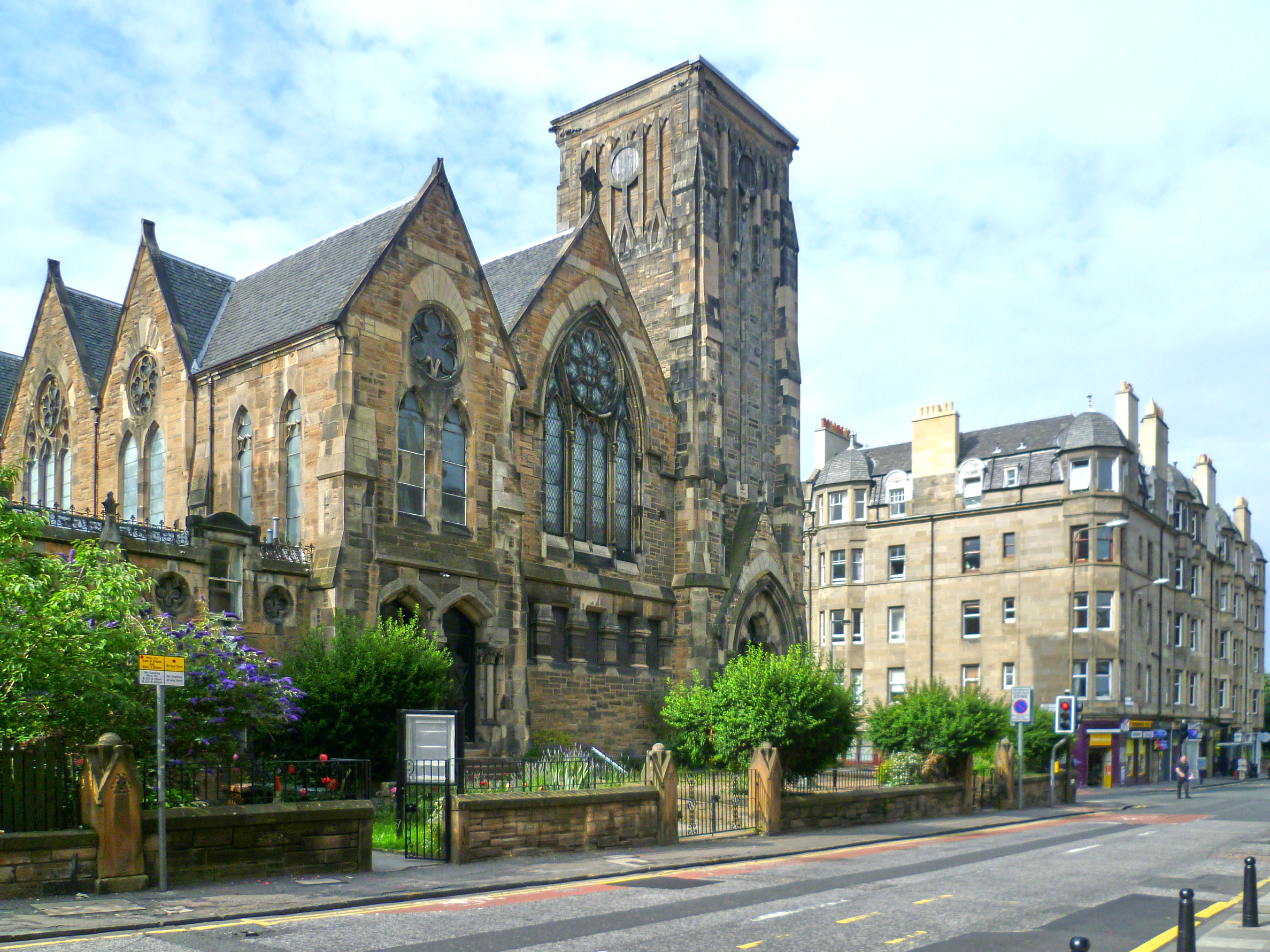
Viewforth Church

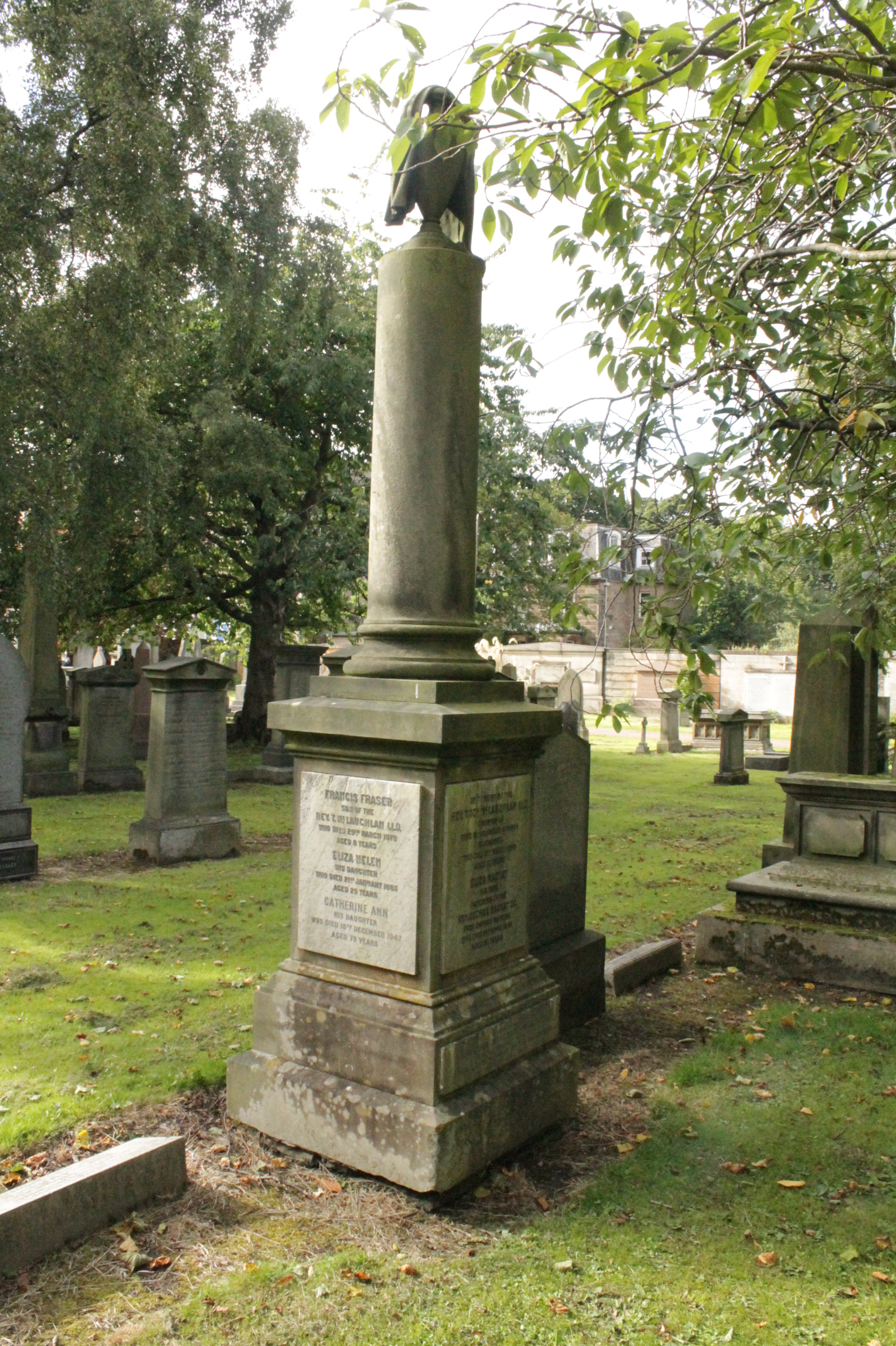
The grave of Rev Thomas McLauchlan, Grange Cemetery, Edinburgh

This popular Gaelic divine was born at Moy, Inverness-shire, on the 29 January 1816. His father was the James Maclauchlan, who laboured long in Moy, while his mother was a member of the Clan Fraser. He was the youngest son of James McLauchlan of Moy in Invernessshire, a Church of Scotland minister. His grandfather was Lauchlan McLauchlan of Abriachan. He studied at King's College, Aberdeen, Marischal College, Aberdeen graduating in 1833 and then the Theological College in Edinburgh under Thomas Chalmers. He was licensed to preach in 1837 by the Presbytery of Inverness, and was appointed colleague and successor to his father at Moy in 1838. At the Disruption he threw in his lot with the protesting party and was appointed minister of Stratherrick. He served the Free Church throughout the Highlands, and in 1846 he went to Canada to visit the Presbyterian Church there as the representative of the Free Church of Scotland. In the spring of 1849 he was called to St. Columba Gaelic Free Church, Edinburgh, where he laboured till the close of his career. He was then living at 16 Keir Street near the Edinburgh Royal Infirmary. He undertook the charge of a Gaelic class for the benefit of Highland students attending the Edinburgh University which he conducted for many years. In 1856 he was made a member of the Society of Antiquaries of Scotland, and among the papers which he contributed to that Society's transactions were — "On the Dean of Lismore's Gaelic Manuscript "; " On Standing Stones in the Ross of Mull "; "On the Kymric Element in the Topography of Scotland. 1 ' In 1864 he received the honour of LL.D. from Aberdeen University. He acted as convener of the Free Church Committee on the Highlands and Islands from 1854 till 1882, and was a warm supporter of whatever had for its object the moral and material welfare of his Highland fellow-countrymen. In 1876 he succeeded Rev Alexander Moody Stuart as Moderator of the General Assembly of the Free Church. He was then living at Viewforth Manse and preaching at Viewforth Church. He died at Edinburgh 21st March, 1886.

Among his best known works are "The Early Scottish Church," 1873; "Carsweirs Prayer Book," 1873; Celtic Gleanings," 1857: "The Dean of Lismore's Book," 1862; "The Gaelic Reference Bible;" which he edited along with Dr. Clark, Kilmallie; "The Review of Gaelic Literature" (1877), which appeared in the "History of the Highlands and Highland Clans," was also from his pen. For many years he translated the "Monthly Visitor" into Gaelic, and the " Fear-tathaich Miosail" was heartily welcomed in many a Highland clachan. Dr. Skene who wrote the "Introduction " to the Dean of Lismore's book, makes the following reference to the labours of Dr. Maclauchlan in connection with that publication: — "It is hardly possible to convey to the reader an adequate conception of the labour of the task undertaken by Dr. Maclauchlan, or of the courage, perseverance and ability with which it has been overcome. Dr. Maclauchlan had first to read the Dean's transcript — no ordinary task, when to a strange orthography, affording no clue to the original word, was added a careless handwriting of the beginning of the sixteenth century, faded ink, and decayed paper. He had then to convert it into the corresponding Gaelic in its modern shape and orthography, and then to translate it into English, in which he had to combine the literal rendering of an idiomatic language with an intelligible exhibition of its meaning in English."

In addition to the original works written by Dr. Maclauchlan, he edited a pocket edition of " Ossian's Poems " and an edition of " Stewart's Gaelic Grammar," while his contributions to current Gaelic literature will be found in the pages of "The Gael" and "Bratach na Firinn".

He died on 21 March 1886. He is buried in Grange Cemetery in south Edinburgh. The grave lies near the centre of the north-west section.

== Publications ==
- "United Parishes of Moy and Dalarossie" (Presbyterial and Parochial Reports on the State of Education in Scotland (1843), 150-5)
- The Depopulation System in the Highlands (1849)
- The Way to God, or the Doctrine of Christ's Mediatorship briefly Expounded (Edinburgh, 1853)
- Celtic Gleanings : or Notices of the History and Literature of the Scottish Gael (Edinburgh, 1857)
- The Poems of Ossian [in Gaelic] (1859)
- The Dean of Lismore's Book [translated and edited with William Forbes Skene, LL.D.] (Edinburgh, 1862)
- The Early Scottish Church from the First to the Twelfth Century (Edinburgh, 1865)
- "Gaelic Literature, Language, and Music" (in John Scott Keltie's A History of the Scottish Highlands (Edinburgh, 1882)
- "Notice of Monoliths on the Island of Mull" (Proc. Soc. Antiq. Scot., v., 48)
- "On the Kymric Element in the Celtic Topography of Scotland" (Ibid., vi., 315)
- Recent Highland Ejections considered (Edinburgh, 1850)
- Criosd an t-eadar mheadhonair 'na Righ, Sermon in Gaelic (Edinburgh, 1860)
- The Book of Common Order, commonly called John Knox's Liturgy, translated into Gaelic (1567) by John Carswell, Bishop of the Isles [the first book printed in Gaelic, of which only three imperfect copies are known] (Edinburgh, 1873)
- The Gaelic Reference Bible [jointly with Dr Clerk, Kilmallie] (Glasgow, 1860, 1863, and other editions

== Artistic recognition ==
He was portrayed by Norman Macbeth

== Family ==
He was married three times:

- (1) 22 March 1848, Eliza (died 16 January 1855, aged 30), daughter of George Mackay, D.D., Free Church, Rafford, and had issue —
  - James John, actuary, secretary Equitable Insurance Co., born 13 December 1848, died at Bath, 26 December 1920
  - George Mackay, planter, India, born 6 April 1851
  - Hugh Simon, journalist, born 13 December 1852, died December 1899
  - Eliza Helen, born 8 January 1855, died 21 January 1885
- (2) 30 July 1857, Margaret Hunter (died 25 January 1864), daughter of John Geddes, C.E., and Davida Sutherland, and had issue —
  - John David, mining engineer, born 14 September 1859
  - Thomas George, physician, born 16 July 1861, died September 1898
  - Margaret Hunter Geddes, born 25 January 1864
- (3) 25 February 1869, Fanny L. (died 13 April 1922), daughter of Hugh Fraser, Aberskey, Stratherrick, and had issue —
  - Francis, born 4 January 1870, died 29 March 1878
  - Simon Lachlan Fraser, electrical engineer, born 14 July 1872
  - Catherine Anna, born 20 September 1874

His older brother Simon Fraser McLauchlan (1808-1881) was also a Free Church minister.
