= St Oran's Church =

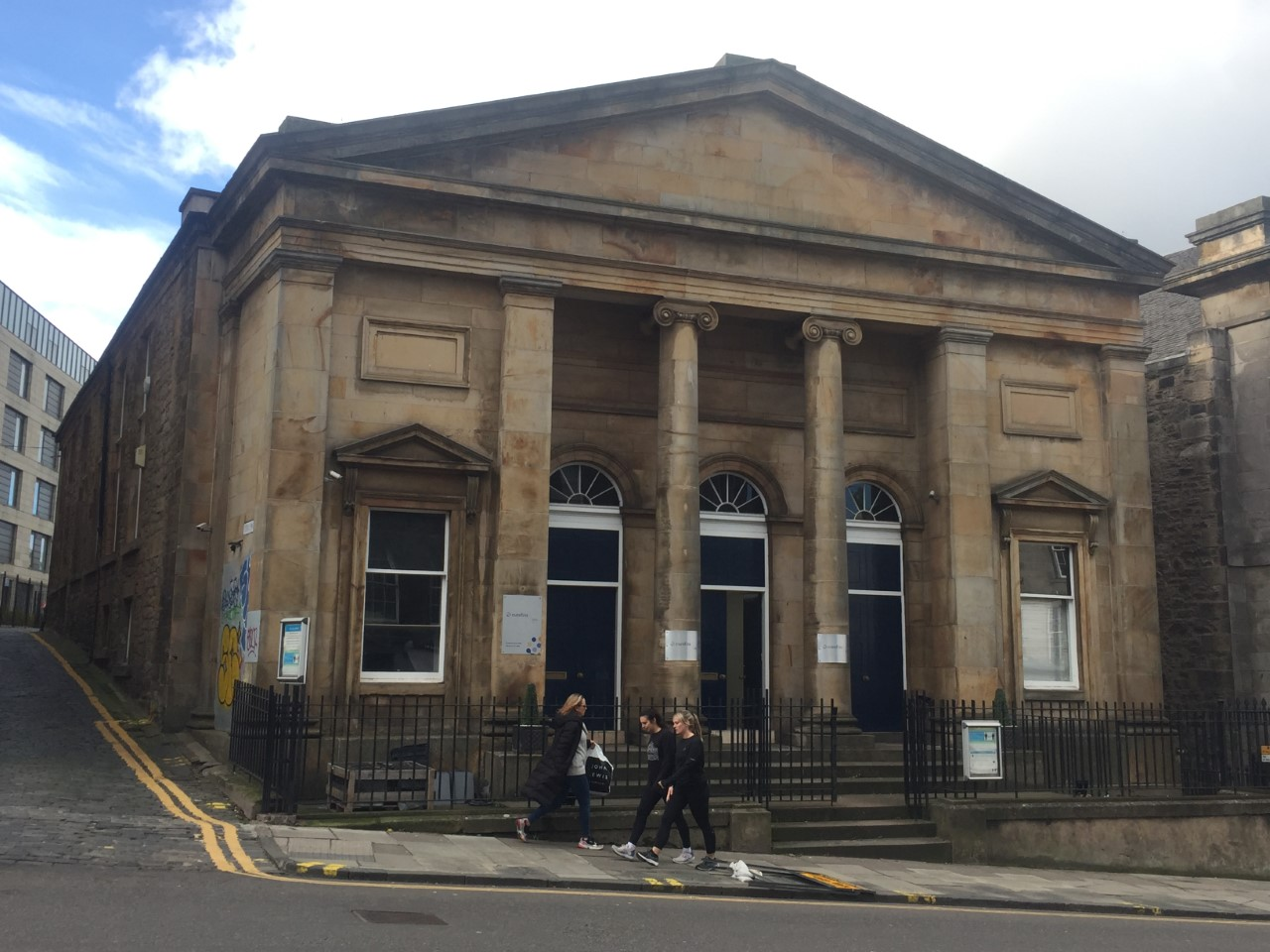
- The congregation's last meeting-place, at Broughton Street
- St Oran's Church
- 55°57′26.27″N 3°11′19.9″W
- Location: Broughton, Edinburgh
- Country: Scotland
- Language(s): Scottish Gaelic, English
- Denomination: Church of Scotland

History
- Former names: Gaelic Church (1835–1900); New Gaelic Chapel (1815–1835); Gaelic Chapel (1769–1815)
- Status: Closed
- Founded: 1769
- Dedication: Oran of Iona

Architecture
- Functional status: Closed
- Architect: John Dick Peddie (attributed)
- Style: Neoclassical
- Years built: 1843–1844
- Closed: 1948

Listed Building – Category B
- Official name: 24 Broughton Street (former Catholic Apsotolic Church), including railings and gate
- Designated: 16 June 1966
- Reference no.: LB28368

St Oran's Church was a Gaelic-speaking congregation of the Church of Scotland in Edinburgh. Originating in the early 18th-century, the congregation continued until 1948, latterly meeting at Broughton Street.

Gaelic public worship in Edinburgh began in the early 18th century and culminated with the opening of the first Gaelic Chapel at Castle Wynd near the Grassmarket in 1769. This was the first Gaelic-speaking congregation in the Scottish Lowlands. A second, larger chapel opened at Horse Wynd in 1813 and the two congregations united in 1815, following which the Castle Wynd building was sold. In 1835, the chapel was raised to the status of a parish quoad sacra. The Disruption of 1843 saw all the church's office holders and almost all of its congregation depart the established church to join the Free Church, creating another Gaelic-speaking congregation in Edinburgh: the Gaelic Free Church. Civic improvements in the Old Town forced the congregation to vacate Horse Wynd in 1870. It settled in the former Catholic Apostolic Church on Broughton Street in 1875. In 1900, the congregation adopted the name "St Oran's". The former Gaelic Free Church – by then known as "St Columba's" – had rejoined the Church of Scotland in 1929 due to denominational unions. The General Assembly concluded the maintenance of two small Gaelic-speaking congregations in Edinburgh was unnecessary and, in 1948, St Oran's and St Columba's united to form the Highland Church, using the St Columba's buildings. Greyfriars Kirk maintains St Oran's tradition of Gaelic worship in Edinburghto the present.

The first Gaelic Chapel was a simple T-plan building with seats for 800. It was demolished in the 1830s. The Horse Wynd building stood on a rectangular plan and was executed in a plain neoclassical style. It was swept away in the public improvements that created Chambers Street. The Broughton Street building – the only building occupied by the Gaelic congregation that still stands – is a neoclassical, temple-like building of 1843–1844, attributed to John Dick Peddie. It is now in commercial use.

== History ==
=== Beginnings: 17th century–1769 ===
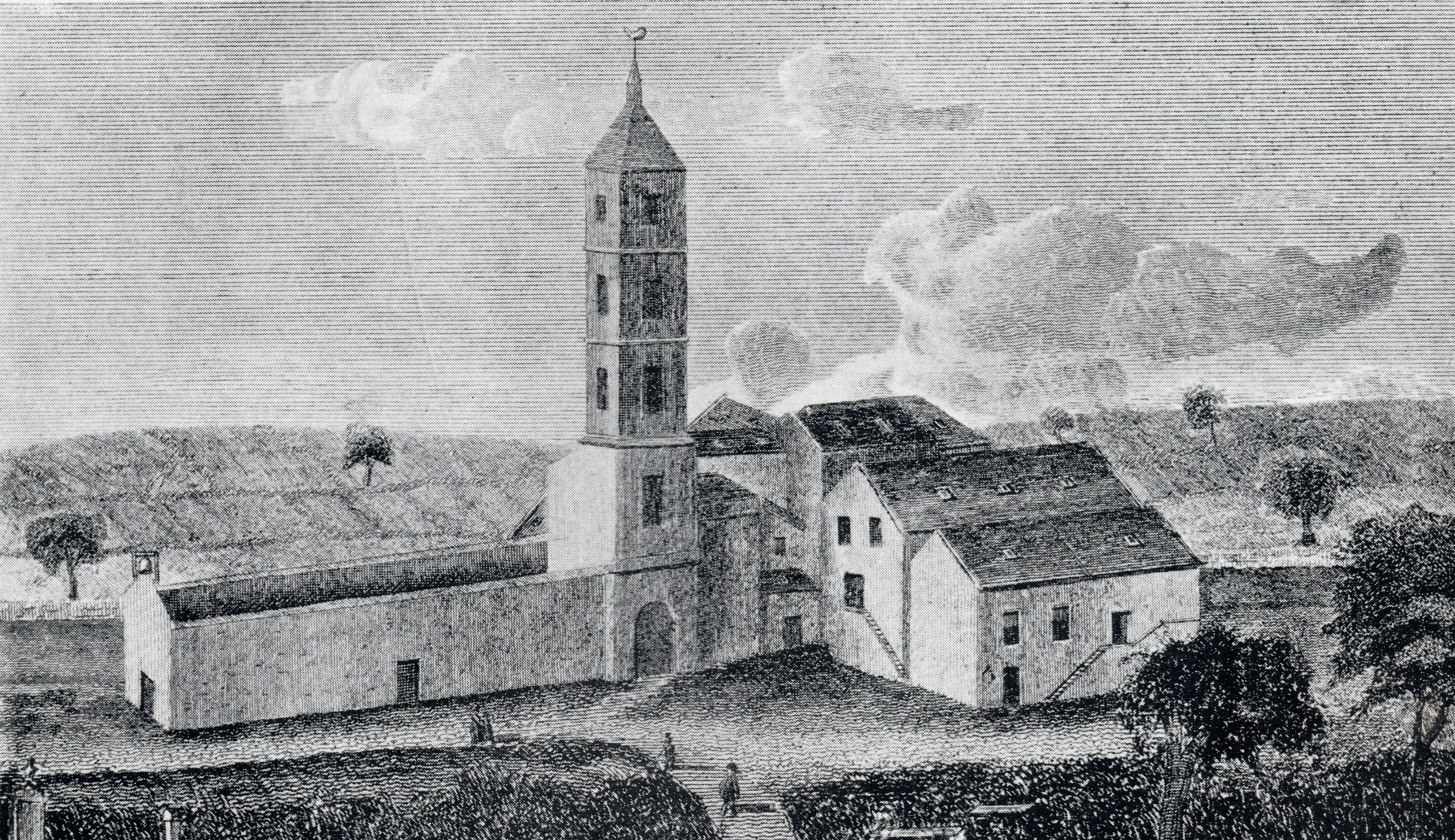
When Neil McVicar, a Gaelic-speaking Highlander, became minister of the West Kirk in 1707, its parish may have contained three to four hundred monolingual Gaelic speakers

By the late 17th century, the number of Gaelic-speaking migrants from the Highlands in Edinburgh had grown significantly. Attempts to provide a place of worship for them were stymied by the paucity of Gaelic-speaking ministers in the Church of Scotland and by the Kirk's insistence from 1694 that Gaelic-speaking ministers remain with Gaelic-speaking Highland parishes unless authorised by their presbytery. The Kirk's requirement that there could be only one place of worship in each parish also complicated the establishment of an extra-parochial Gaelic chapel. The General Assembly did, however, make provision for Gaelic preaching in Edinburgh in 1704; nevertheless, this could not be effected due to the lack of a Gaelic-speaking minister.

Gaelic worship began after the appointment of Neil McVicar as minister of the West Kirk in 1707. McVicar was a Highlander fluent in Gaelic and English. (Note: Ian R. MacDonald believes McVicar's ability in Gaelic was irrelevant to his appointment. By contrast, Charles Withers believes it was a key factor.) The Presbytery of Argyll approved McVicar's move to Edinburgh on the basis that there were three to four hundred monolingual Gaelic-speakers in the West Kirk's parish, which covered a large area outside the city walls of Edinburgh. Highlanders may have made up as much as a tenth of the parish's population at this time. McVicar was preaching in Gaelic even before the Presbytery of Edinburgh formally charged him to do so in 1710.

After McVicar's death in 1747, army chaplains based at the Castle may have maintained Gaelic worship until Dugald Buchanan's arrival in Edinburgh in 1765. Though a layman, Buchanan gathered round him a Gaelic-speaking congregation which met at College Street Relief Church in the Southside. Buchanan was unable to qualify as a minister before his sudden death in 1768.

=== Castle Wynd: 1769–1815 ===
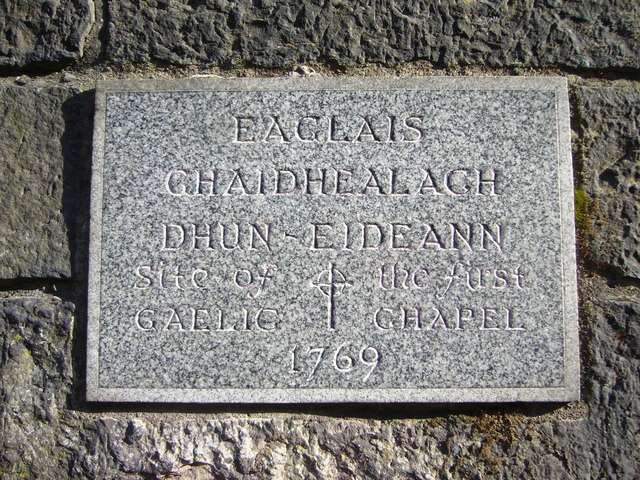
A plaque on Johnston Terrace, marking the site of the Gaelic Chapel

At the time of Buchanan's death, plans were already underway to create a permanent Gaelic church. In 1766, some prominent Edinburgh citizens, led by burgess William Dickson, issued an appeal to create a formal Gaelic chapel. Dickson raised £300 and purchased a plot of land between the Castle and the Grassmarket. This was near the White Hart Inn: a favoured meeting place of Highlanders. Building commenced in May 1767 and the chapel – a simple T-plan building with seats for 800 – opened in summer 1769. The Society in Scotland for Propagating Christian Knowledge was responsible for nominating preachers while the chapel came under the jurisdiction of Old Greyfriars kirk session and was managed a group of twelve deacons. As a full Gaelic Bible had not been published by the time the chapel opened, the church's reader was responsible for translating the readings into Gaelic.

The chapel was the first designated Gaelic-speaking place of worship in lowland Scotland. Gaelic chapels in Glasgow (1770); Perth (1781); Dundee (1791); Greenock (1792); Paisley (1793) soon followed. A Roman Catholic Gaelic chapel was also established in Edinburgh in 1776 and burnt in anti-Catholic rioting in 1779. The first minister was Joseph Robertson, who had assisted Buchanan at College Street. A member of Clan Gregor, Robertson re-adopted the surname MacGregor after the clan's legal suppression was ended in 1774. During MacGregor's enthusiastic ministry, Edinburgh's Gaelic community became renowned for its probity. The poet Duncan Ban MacIntyre was a friend of MacGregor's and a regular worshipper at the chapel.

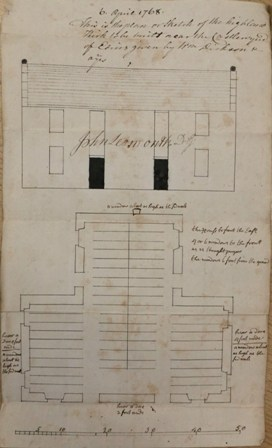
Plan of the first Gaelic Chapel, Chapel Wynd

As early as 1787, members of the congregation were raising concerns over the state and capacity of the chapel. That year, Sir John Macgregor Murray gave £50 for the chapel to be enlarged on the condition that the front pew be reserved for him, his family, and, in their absence, any members of his clan who could not afford to rent a pew.

In 1807, John McDonald became minister. By that year, less than a tenth of the congregation was monolingual in Gaelic. McDonald was nevertheless resistant to the introduction of English-language worship. McDonald was so popular a minister that, in 1813, his final service was held in the West Kirk, the congregation being too large for the Gaelic Chapel. Following McDonald's departure, the congregation introduced an English service to supplement Gaelic worship.

=== Horse Wynd: 1815–1870 ===
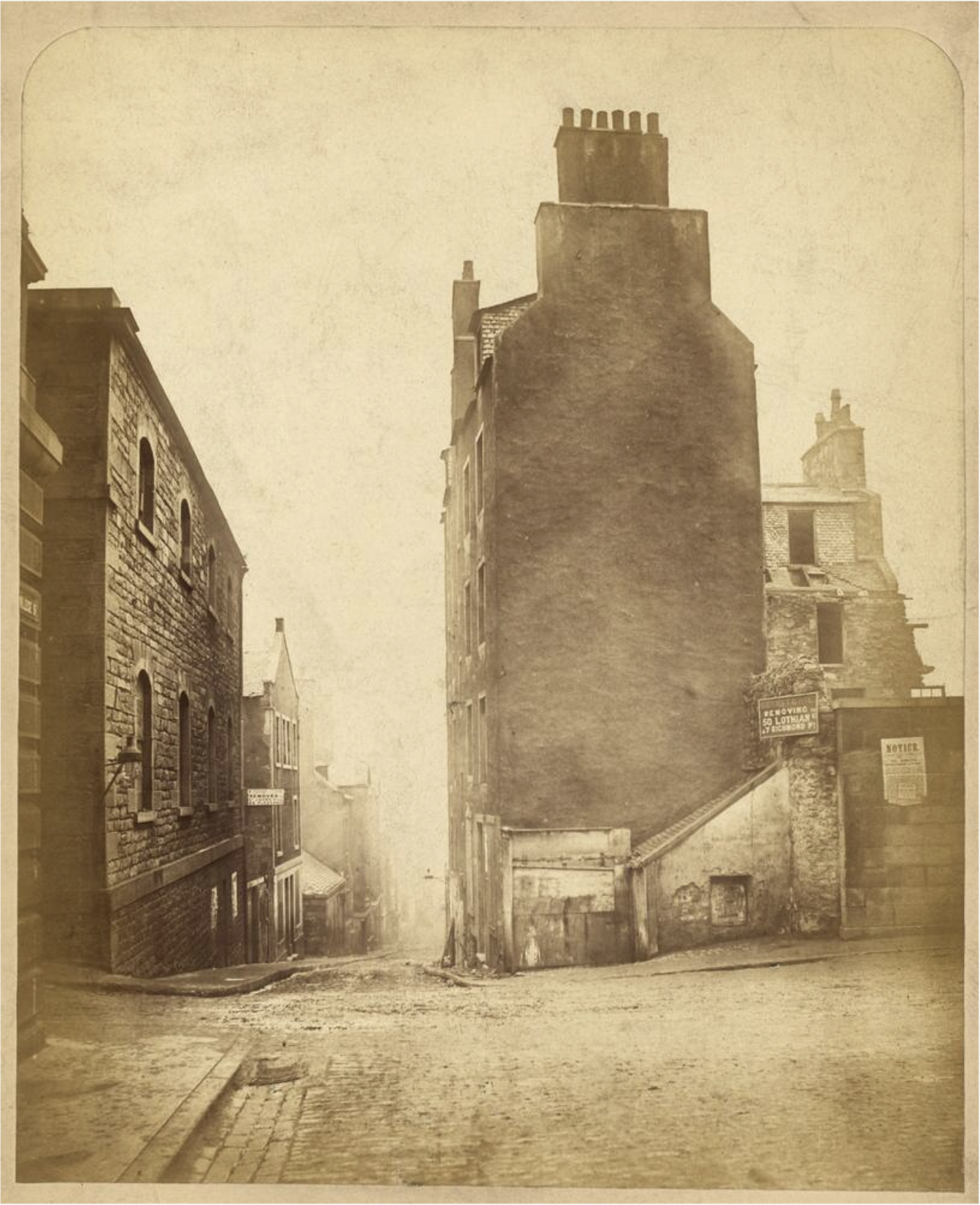
Horse Wynd: the side of the Gaelic Church is visible on the left

During McDonald's ministry, overcrowding in the chapel had remained a problem. To address this, the congregation planned a new chapel. In 1808, a site was purchased on the corner of Horse Wynd and North College Street, near what is now Chambers Street. The new chapel opened in 1813, under the name the Gaelic and English Chapel of Ease. The chapel could accommodate 1,093 worshippers. The Writers to the Signet and the Corporation of Edinburgh supported its £3,000 cost. The new chapel's first minister, Charles Matheson, served for little over a year. Both Gaelic charges were now empty while the new chapel had accrued significant debts. The SSPCK transferred its interest to the new chapel and the two congregations united in 1815. That year, the Chapel Wynd building was sold; it was demolished in 1830s. The united congregation was known as the New Gaelic Chapel.

In 1835, the Gaelic Chapel became a parish quoad sacra with a ministry to all Gaelic speakers in Edinburgh rather than to a geographic parish. In 1850, the Court of Teinds supported the congregation's status as the Gaelic parish church for the city and designated it the Gaelic Church and Parish of Edinburgh with no territorial parish but a responsibility to all Gaelic speakers in the city.

At the Disruption of 1843, the vast majority of the congregation, including all its office-bearers, joined the Free Church. This effectively created a new congregation: the Gaelic Free Church. The Free congregation continued to meet in the Horse Wynd building until 1844. The few congregants who had remained in the established church were not in a position to appoint a new board of trustees until 1845. The established congregation recovered somewhat and, in 1846, was able to appoint a new minister, Alexander MacKellar. During the ministry of Donald Tolmie Masson between 1862 and 1897, the wider life of the congregation grew stronger: monthly Gaelic evening services began in 1856, a Sabbath School in 1863, and a congregational choir in 1864.

=== Broughton Street: 1870–1929 ===
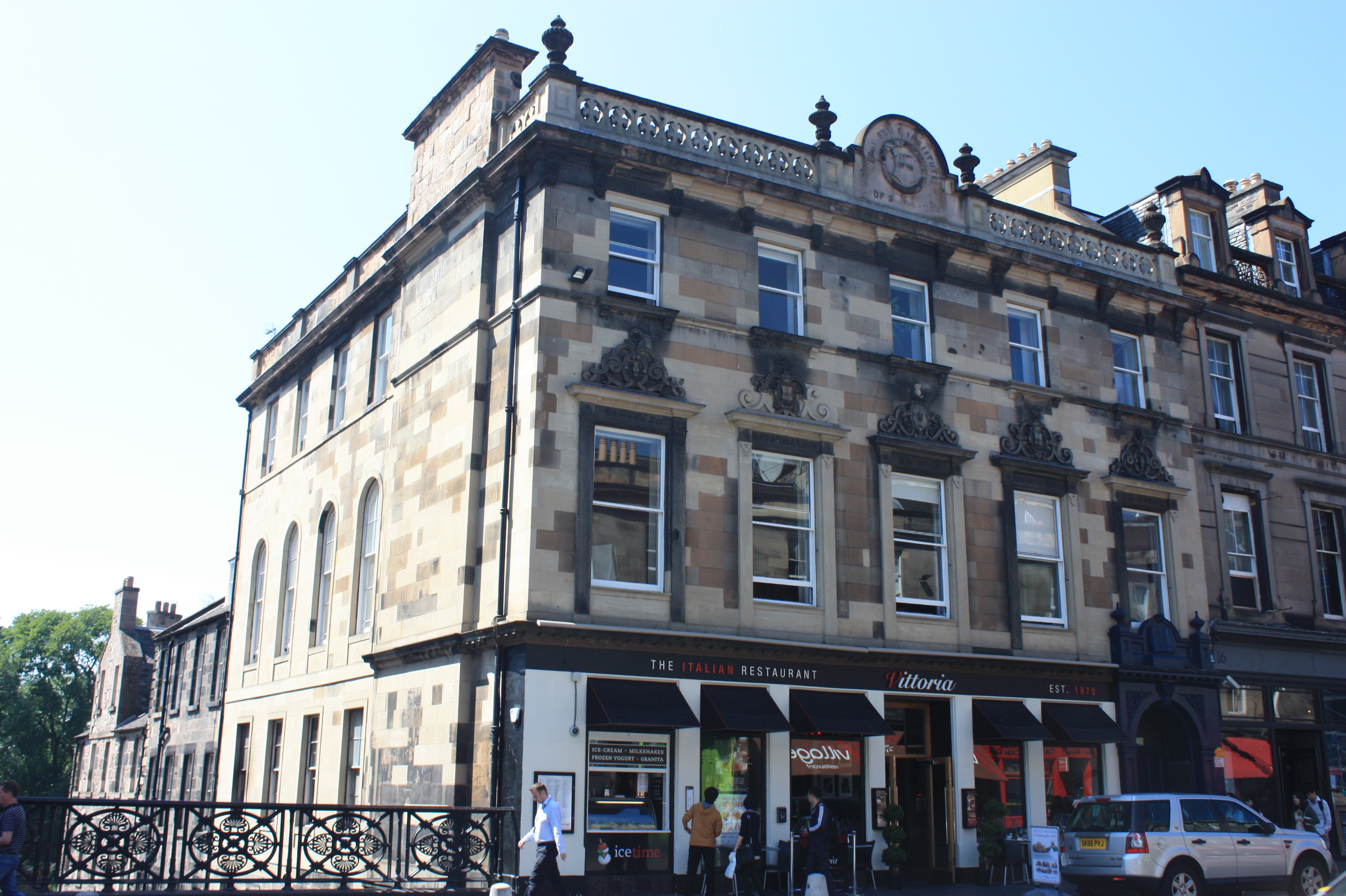
The Protestant Institute, George IV Bridge, where the Gaelic congregation met from 1870 to 1875

The Edinburgh Improvement Act 1867 (30 & 31 Vict. c. xliv) provided for the creation of Chambers Street, which required the demolition of the Horse Wynd chapel. In 1869, the congregation received £6,000 in compensation in return for vacating their building. The congregation vacated the Horse Wynd building the following year and worshipped nearby at the Protestant Institute on George IV Bridge until 1875, when they purchased the former Catholic Apostolic church on Broughton Street. The SSPCK retained its right to nominate the church's minister even after the abolition of patronage in the Church of Scotland in 1874.

By the end of the 19th-century, the congregation appears to have been depleted. Responding to reports of the declining use of Gaelic in the worship of Highland parishes, the Gaelic church's minister, Donald Tolmie Masson, wrote to the editor of The Scotsman in April 1896:

All these dreary three-and-forty years I have been preaching to my countrymen in this city in their native tongue, and my voice has been vox clamantis in sicco. (Note: "A voice crying in the wilderness": Matthew 3:3; Mark 1:3; Luke 3:4; John 1:23; Isaiah 40:3) Never since the whole body of the people, with their minister and elders, left the Old Gaelic Church in Argyle Square for the Free Church, now known as St Columba's, leaving not a hoof behind, has the work of my church been other than most depressing. So was it with all my predecessors.

In response, another correspondent, writing under the name "Argyle Square", noted that, though the church had been well-attended forty years prior, the move to Broughton Street had affected its congregation. The correspondent nevertheless attributed the bulk of the congregation's decline to Masson's "dry manner and cold reserve". Masson wrote two further letters to The Scotsman to defend himself against these accusations and against another correspondent named "Highland Churchman".

Likely motivated by the union of the Free and United Presbyterian churches in 1900, the congregation that year adopted the more distinctive name of "St Oran's". Saint Kessog and Saint Chattan were also considered as potential dedicatees. In 1916, John Campbell Macgregor, the church's minister since 1911, died of wounds sustained in the First World War and James Duff MacDonald succeeded him as minister the following year.

=== Union: 1929–1948 ===
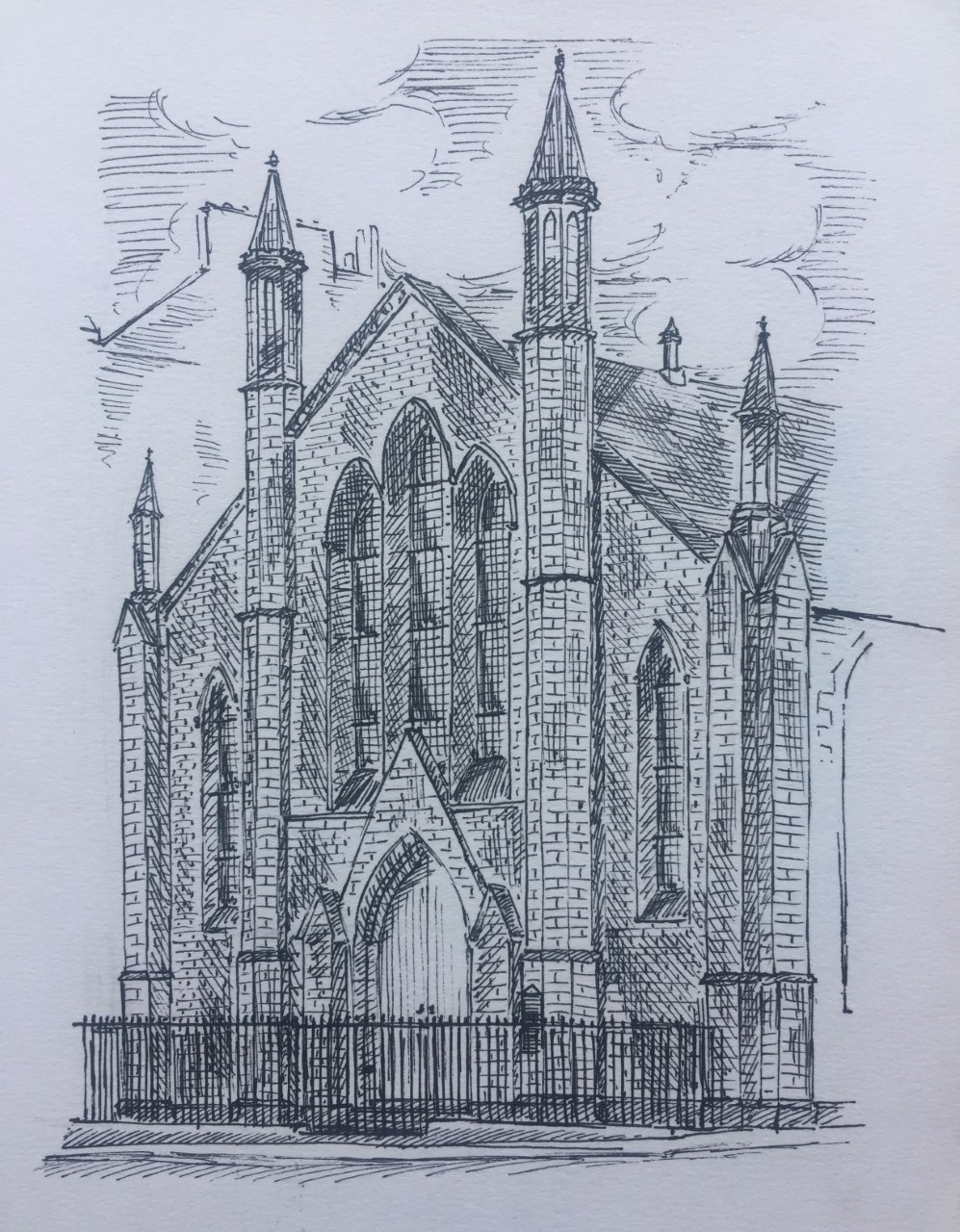
St Columba's, Cambridge Street, with which St Oran's united in 1948 to form the Highland Church

Ahead of the union of the Church of Scotland with the United Free Church in 1929, ownership of St Oran's transferred from the SSPCK to the Church of Scotland and the voluntary supplement was redirected in 1935. In the years prior to James Duff MacDonald's death in 1945, the church's membership had begun to tail off. The Free Gaelic congregation that had split from the established church in 1843 had, by this point, adopted the name "St Columba's" and, though denominational unions, joined the United Free Church in 1900 and rejoined the Church of Scotland in 1929. In this context, the General Assembly concluded the maintenance of two small, Gaelic-speaking congregations in the city was unnecessary and, from 1930, sought to unite the charges.

Attempts to unite St Oran's and St Columba's were often fraught. Members of St Oran's unsuccessfully proposed that both congregations leave their buildings and use the Queen Street Church or that both united with St Andrew's. Following several failed meetings, the case was referred to the General Assembly in May 1948. Summarising the contrasting histories of Edinburgh's two Gaelic congregations, J. Boog Thomson, session clerk of St Oran's, told The Scotsman at the time:

We represent a minority in the Presbytery by blood and tradition, and many of us by language. We don't think the same. Our outlook is different. St Columba's are not only mainly representative of the Free Church, but were drawn and recruited from Ross and Cromarty and the fringe of Inverness. They were Mackenzies, MacLeods, and Macdonalds. St Oran's were recruited mainly from Argyll, with a large predominance of Campbells, Shaws, and Macdougals. The struggle between the two congregations has been going on for at least a century. St Columba's congregation walked out in 1842, [sic] and since then there has been intermittent litigation as to the return of the funds and property. Thirty years ago we got the last of our property back. We feel we have nothing in common with the people of St Columba's.

Following the General Assembly's intervention, the two congregations united on 4 July 1948. The united congregation adopted the name "Highland Church" and used the St Columba's buildings. The St Oran's building was sold to Messrs. Nairn for commercial use in 1950. The building is now a clinical science research facility. To mark the bicentenary of the Gaelic Chapel in 1969, a service was held at the site of the first chapel and a commemorative plaque unveiled. The Highland Church united with Tolbooth St John's in 1956 to form Highland, Tolbooth, St John's, which continued to hold Gaelic services. Since Highland, Tolbooth, St John's united with Greyfriars Kirk in 1979, the latter congregation has held a weekly Gaelic service, maintaining St Oran's tradition of Gaelic worship in Edinburgh.

== Ministers ==
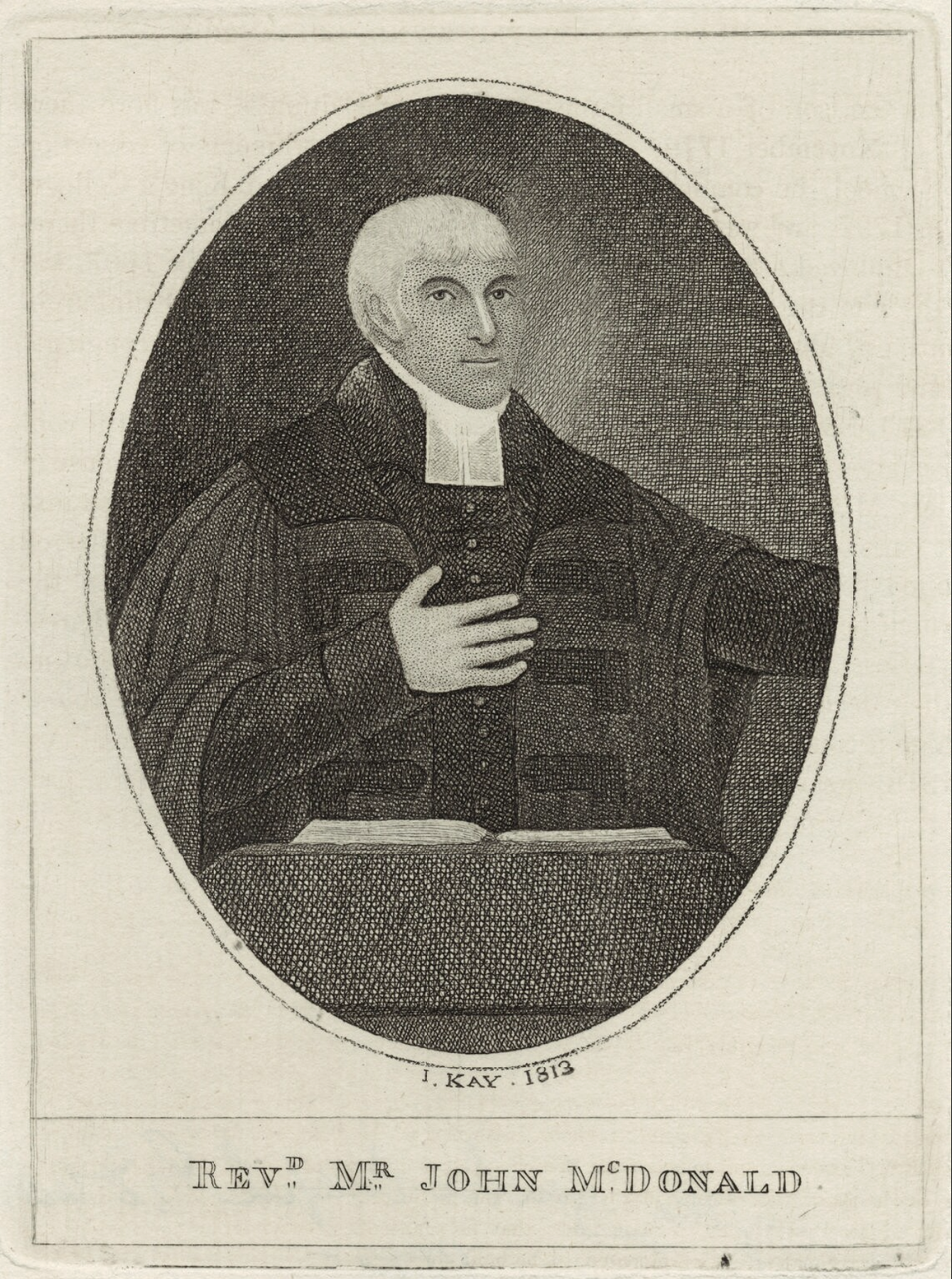
John McDonald, caricatured by John Kay while minister of the Gaelic Chapel

The following ministers served the Gaelic Chapel (1769–1815); the Gaelic and English Chapel of Ease (1813–1815); the New Gaelic Chapel (1815–1835); the Gaelic Church (1835–1900); and St Oran's Church (1900–1948):

- 1775–1801 Joseph Robertson (MacGregor)
- 1799–1806 James McLauchlan
- 1807–1813 John McDonald
- 1813–1814 Charles Ross Matheson†
- 1815–1821 John Munro
- 1823–1831 Duncan McCaig
- 1831–1837 John MacAlister
- 1837–1839 Hugh McLeod
- 1840–1843 James Noble
- 1846–1849 Alexander MacKellar
- 1850–1853 Alexander MacGregor
- 1854–1897 Donald Tolmie Masson
- 1897–1910 George Robert MacLellan
- 1911–1916 John Campbell MacGregor
- 1917–1945 James Duff MacDonald

† Minister of the Gaelic and English Chapel of Ease

== Buildings and plate ==
=== Castle Wynd ===
The original chapel was a plain T-plan building with a sloping, red-tiled roof and seating for 800. It had two entrances, both facing onto Castle Wynd. Another pathway connected the chapel to the Castle esplanade. There were four windows on the chapel's east side, glazed with lozenge panes in the bottom and with shutters for ventilation at the top. Similar skylights ventilated the roof of the building. In 1782, gutters were added to the roof.

Internally, the church seated 800 on wooden benches. It was paved with flagstones, including one separating the reader's desk from the communion table. The pulpit and reader's desk were covered in green cloth with a bracket for the baptismal bowl in the upper part of the pulpit. Later additions included a chandelier in 1782, a stove, an hour-glass, communion plate, and a money box.

=== Horse Wynd ===
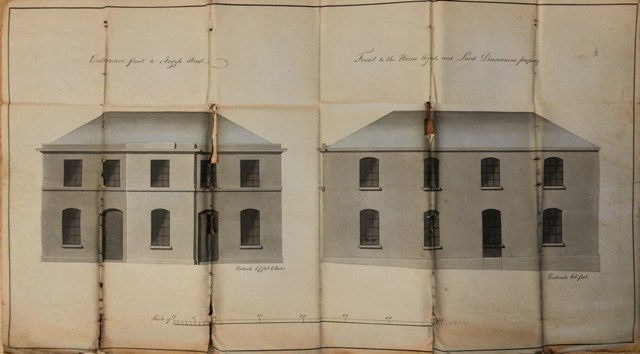
Exterior plan of the Horse Wynd chapel

Plans submitted to the Dean of Guild's court show the Horse Wynd chapel as a simple Neoclassical building. The facade of five bays consisted of two storeys separated by a simple course of moulding. The walls were capped by a simple cornice and short attic storey while a pitched roof covered the building. The windows of the upper storey were rectangular while the openings on the ground floor (windows at the outer and central bays with doors in between) were segmental-arched. The central bay was slightly advanced with an advanced central panel in its attic sotrey. The plan shows the flank of the building as consisting of a simple wall of four bays and two storeys with segmental-arched windows. The chapel could seat 1,000 and the plans for the interior show with a bowed gallery.

=== Broughton Street ===
The Broughton Street building was constructed between 1843 and 1844 for a congregation of the Catholic Apostolic Church. The design is attributed to John Dick Peddie; if this is correct, it would be his earliest completed design. The building is in the Neoclassical style with a facade of five bays under an unadorned pediment. The three central bays are recessed and divided by Ionic pillars. The outer bays are framed by Doric pilasters. Each outer bay features an architraved window with a pediment on consoles below an architraved panel. The central bays feature three round-headed doors beneath a continuous architraved panel. The sides of them are faced in rubble while the rear incorporates a deep apse with three round-headed windows. Following its secularisation, the building was partitioned internally into three storeys with a basement.

This building also featured a plaque, erected to the memory of John Campbell MacGregor after his death in 1916. In 1921, the congregation unveiled a brass memorial plaque, listing the names of 18 members of the congregation who died in the First World War. This is now housed in Greyfriars Kirk. In 1930, the church was renovated, including the repair of the external steps and the installation of an Estey organ.

The former St Oran's Church has been protected as a Category B listed building since 1966.

=== Plate ===
The congregation originally possessed pewter communion cups. In 1821, the congregation purchased two silver communion cups with the effects of Sergeant John Munro of the Royal Scots and inscribed "DA CHOTHEN GHAELIC DHUNEIDIN A REIR THIOMNUIDH SHERGt. EOIN MUNRO TROIMH LAMH EOIN MUNRO A MINr. 1821." ( To the Gaelic Congregation of Edinburgh according to the will of Sergt. John Munro, by the hand of John Munro, the minister. 1821.) The Free congregation retained these cups and a baptismal basin until the established congregation successfully petitioned for their return in 1854.
