= Highland Church =

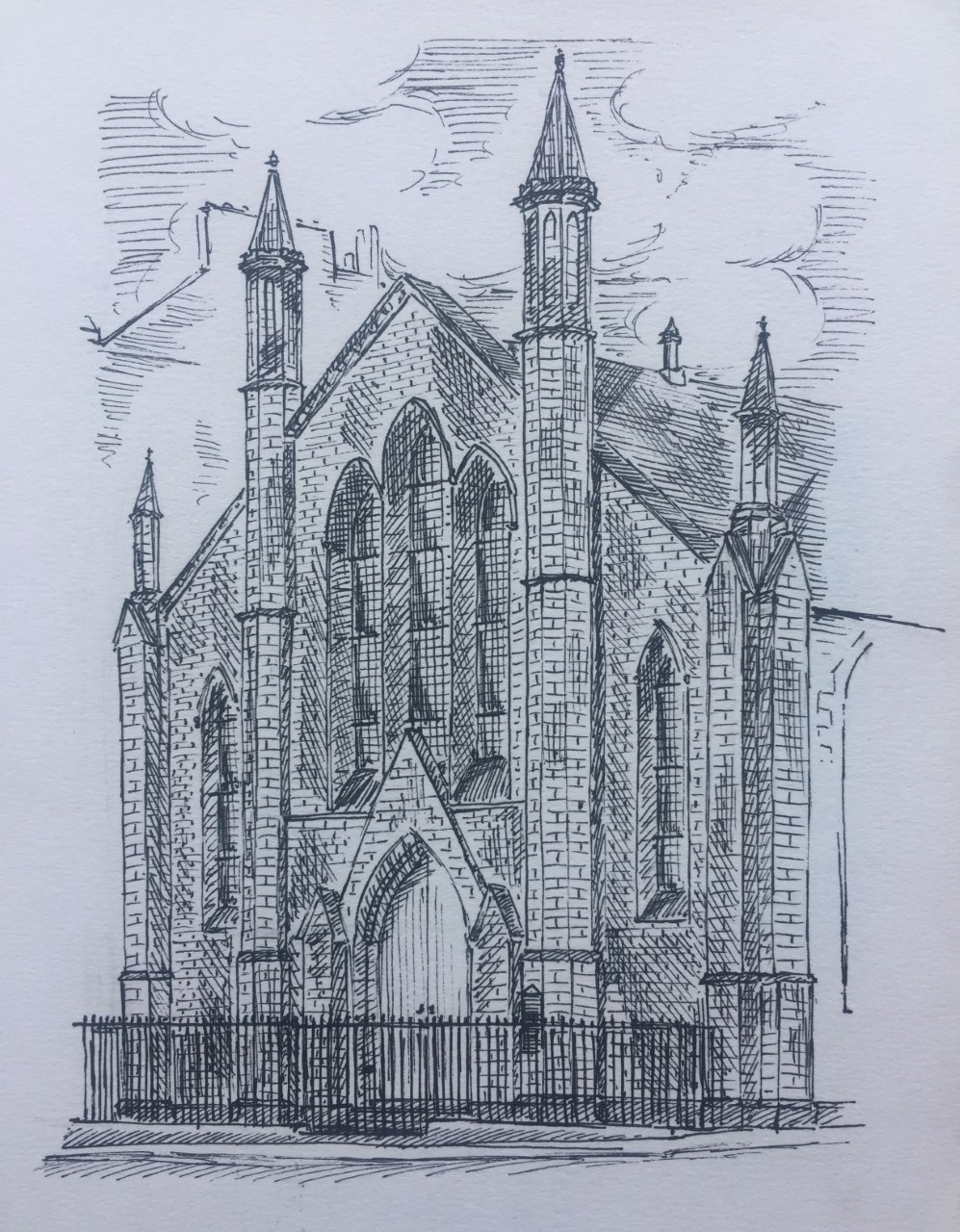
- Highland Church
- 55°56′51.74″N 3°12′17.28″W
- Country: Scotland
- Language(s): Scottish Gaelic; English
- Denomination: Church of Scotland
- Previous denomination: United Free Church of Scotland (1900–1929); Free Church of Scotland (1843–1900)

History
- Former names: St Columba's Gaelic Church (1929–1948); St Columba's Gaelic United Free Church (1900–1929); St Columba's Gaelic Free Church (1864–1900); Lothian Road Gaelic Free Church (1844–1851); Gaelic Free Church (1843–1844; 1851–1864)
- Status: Closed
- Founded: 1843
- Dedication: Columba of Iona (1864–1948)

Architecture
- Functional status: Demolished
- Architect: Patrick Wilson
- Style: Early English
- Completed: 1851
- Construction cost: £2,121 14s
- Closed: 1956
- Demolished: 1989

Specifications
- Capacity: 1,000

The Highland Church was a Gaelic-speaking congregation of the Church of Scotland, based in Tollcross, Edinburgh. Formed by the union of St Oran's Church and St Columba's Gaelic Church in 1948, the congregation continued united with Tolbooth St John's in 1956.

Gaelic worship in Edinburgh began in the early 18th century, leading to the opening of the Gaelic Chapel in 1769. At the Disruption of 1843, all the office-bearers of the Gaelic congregation joined Free Church along with most of the congregation's members. The Free congregation met at a building off Lothian Road before moving nearby to a permanent church at Cambridge Street in Tollcross. From 1846 to 1849, Thomas McLauchlan served as the congregation's minister. An active pastor, he strengthened congregation's activities and served as the moderator of the Free Church's general assembly in 1876. The congregation adopted the name St Columba's Gaelic Free Church, after Columba of Iona, in 1864. In 1900, most of the congregation joined the United Free Church, which had been formed by the union of the Free and United Presbyterian churches. Disputes and schisms around the union diminished the congregation, however. By 1931, the regular English service, introduced in 1886, had become the congregation's main act of worship. The union of United Free Church with the Church of Scotland in 1929 brought St Columba's and the congregation from which it had split – known, by this point, as St Oran's – into the same denomination. Edinburgh's two Gaelic congregations united in 1948. They continued to use the St Columba's buildings until uniting with Tolbooth St John's in 1956. Via Highland, Tolbooth, St John's union with Greyfriars Kirk in 1979, the latter congregation maintains a weekly Gaelic service.

St Columba's occupied a simple building in the Early English style by Patrick Wilson, completed in 1851. The building afterwards served as an arts venue before being demolished in 1989. The Saltire Court development, incorporating the Traverse Theatre, now occupies the site.

== History ==
=== Foundation ===
The Highland Church originated in Edinburgh's original Gaelic congregation, which could trace its origins to the turn of the 18th century. The Gaelic congregation within the Church of Scotland was formally established with its own building at Chapel Wynd in the Old Town in 1769. The congregation moved to Horse Wynd near modern day Chambers Street in 1815. At the Disruption of 1843, the vast majority of the congregation, including all its office-bearers, joined the Free Church. They continued to meet in the Horse Wynd building until 1844. The few congregants who had remained in the established church were not in a position to appoint a new board of trustees until 1845.

After the newly-formed Gaelic Free congregation was expelled from the Horse Wynd chapel in 1844, they worshipped for a year in the hall of the Royal High School before occupying a simple brick building between Lothian Road and Castle Terrace. The building had been constructed for and soon vacated by the congregation which had left St George's at the Disruption. During this period, the congregation was known as Lothian Road Gaelic Free Church. Despite the Free Church's plans to build a new Gaelic church as a monument to John Knox, this never materialised and the congregation raised its own funds to build a new church nearby on Cambridge Street in Tollcross, which opened on 16 May 1851.

=== Cambridge Street: 1851–1929 ===
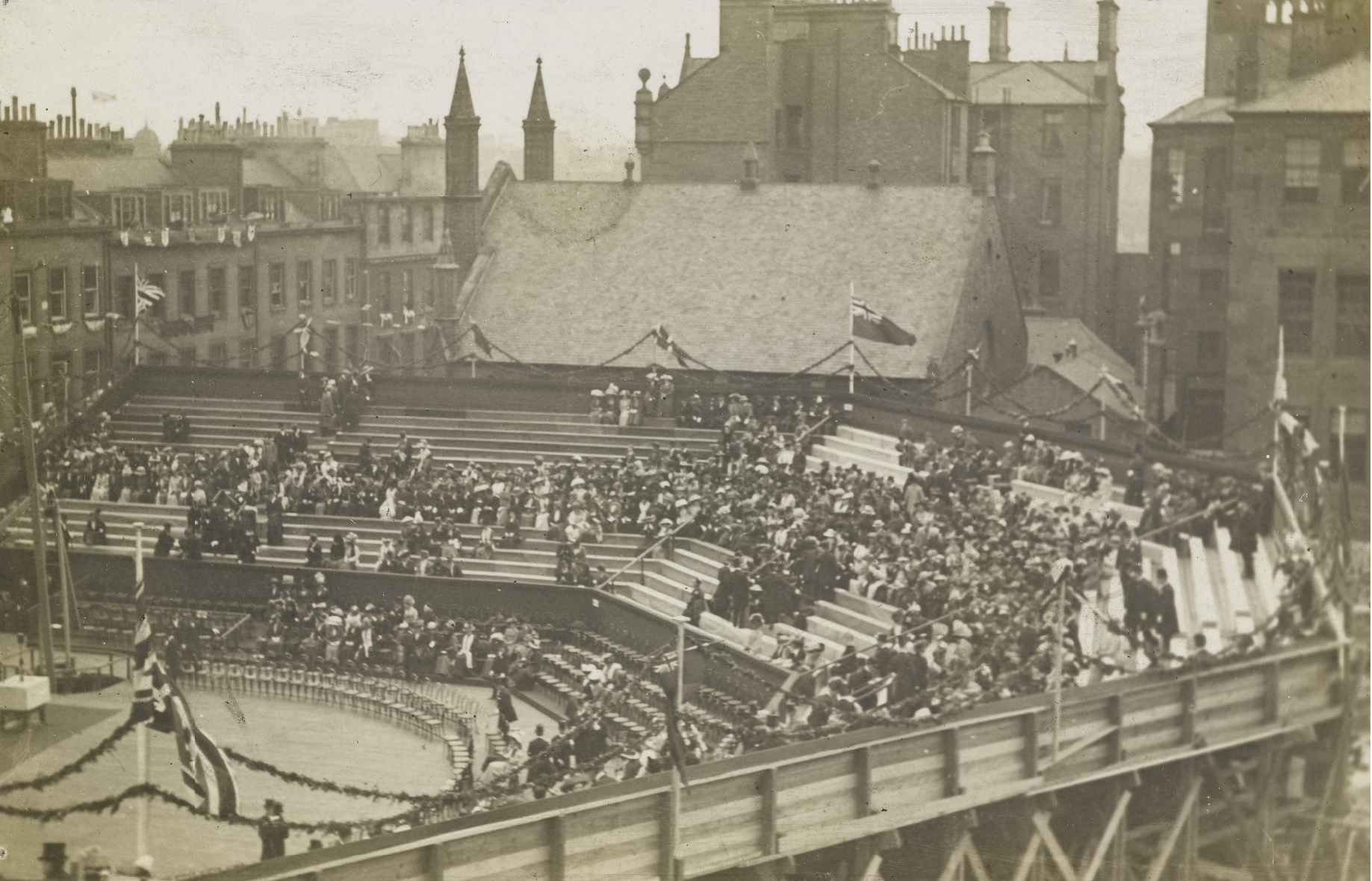
The laying of the foundation stone of the Usher Hall in 1911, St Columba's is in the background

The church's minister from 1849 to 1884 was Thomas McLauchlan, who founded a Sunday School and, in 1874, hosted evangelistic meetings by Dwight Moody and Ira Sankey. McLauchlan was elected moderator of the Free Church's general assembly in 1876. During his tenure, the church also adopted the name "St Columba's" in 1864. English preachers had, occasionally, been invited but only in 1886 was a regular English service established.

As the Free and United Presbyterian churches moved towards union at the end of the 19th century, some of St Columba's members who objected to the union left in 1892. These formed the core of Edinburgh's Free Presbyterian congregation, which was formalised two years later. The Free Presbyterian congregation initially used both Gaelic and English in worship.

In 1900, the Free and United Presbyterian churches united to form the United Free Church. Though St Columba's minister and the majority of its office-holders and members joined the United Free Church, some members of St Columba's joined the continuing Free Church. Most would go on to form St Columba's Free Church, which met in the former St John's Free Church buildings on Johnston Terrace in the Old Town.

The union and schism of 1900 embroiled the congregation in the legal battle over whether the United Free Church or the continuing remnant of the Free Church had rights to the former Free Church's assets. After a decision of the House of Lords, St Columba's was expelled from its buildings in April 1905 and, until November 1906, the congregation met at St Andrew's United Free Church, Drumsheugh Gardens, in the West End. After this, a parliamentary commission to resolve the dispute allowed St Columba's to return. These secessions and moves diminished the congregation; though it would recover somewhat in the following years.

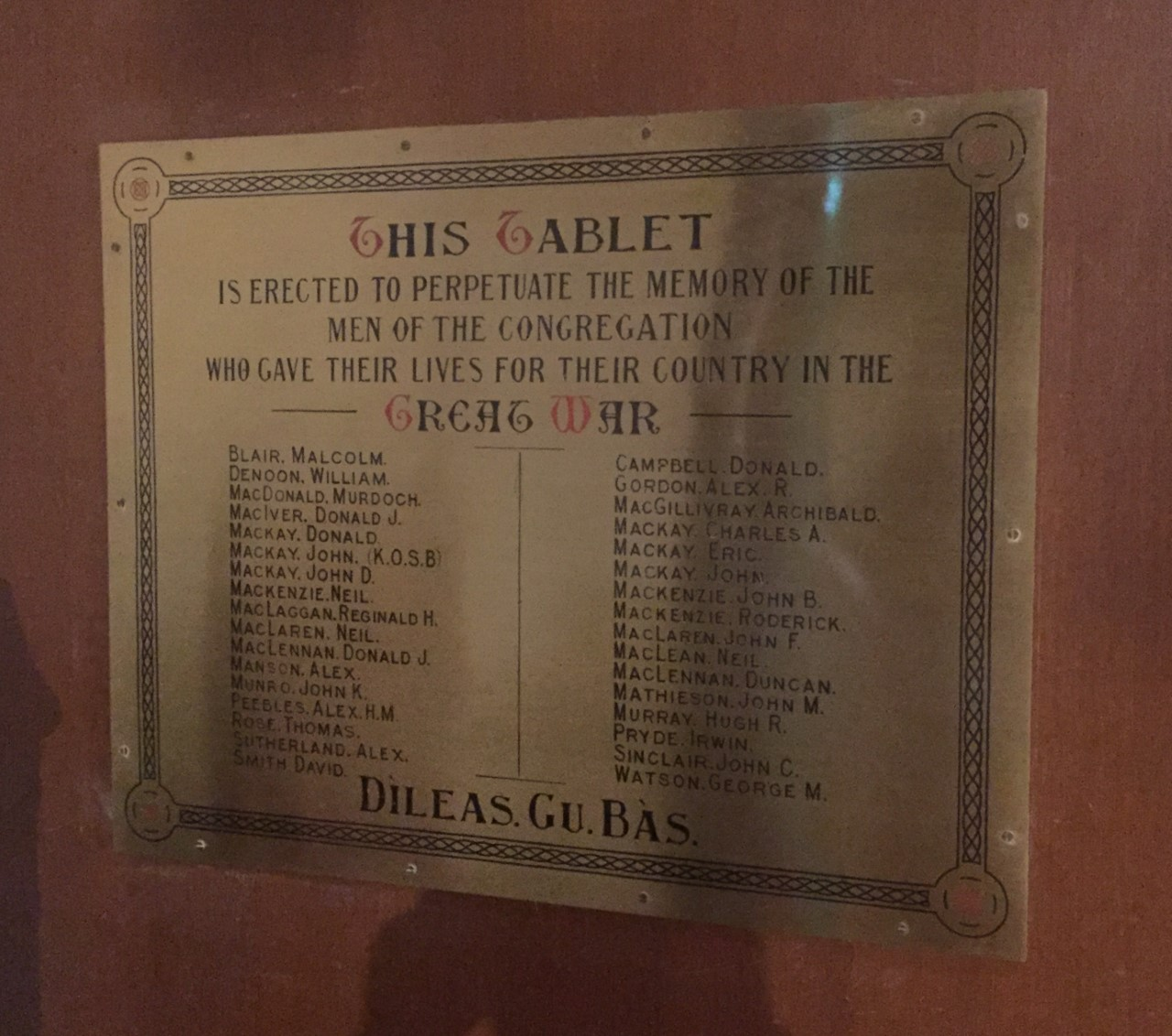
St Columba's First World War memorial, now housed in Greyfriars Kirk

In 1910, the council announced a new concert venue – the Usher Hall – would occupy a site neighbouring St Columba's. The congregation petitioned the council against the construction of the hall on the grounds it would obstruct light from the church. Although the petition was unsuccessful, the congregation gained an undertaking that no new buildings would be constructed between the church and the Usher Hall.

33 men of the congregation died in the First World War.

=== Union: 1929–1948 ===
In 1929, the United Free Church and the Church of Scotland had united. The established Gaelic congregation, St Oran's, and St Columba's were now both within the same denomination. From 1930, church authorities initiated moves to unite the two congregations. In this period, English was also becoming the predominant language of worship. From 1931, the English service, which had been conducted in the hall was moved to church buildings on Sunday morning with the Gaelic service taking place in the afternoon.

Attempts to unite St Oran's and St Columba's were often fraught. Members of St Oran's unsuccessfully proposed that both congregations leave their buildings and use the Queen Street Church or that both unite with St Andrew's. Following several failed meetings, the case was referred to the General Assembly in May 1948. Summarising the contrasting histories of Edinburgh two Gaelic congregations, J. Boog Thomson, session clerk of St Oran's, told The Scotsman at the time:

We represent a minority in the Presbytery by blood and tradition, and many of us by language. We don't think the same. Our outlook is different. St Columba's are not only mainly representative of the Free Church, but were drawn and recruited from Ross and Cromarty and the fringe of Inverness. They were Mackenzies, MacLeods, and Macdonalds. St Oran's were recruited mainly from Argyll, with a large predominance of Campbells, Shaws, and Macdougals. The struggle between the two congregations has been going on for at least a century. St Columba's congregation walked out in 1842, [sic] and since then there has been intermittent litigation as to the return of the funds and property. Thirty years ago we got the last of our property back. We feel we have nothing in common with the people of St Columba's.

Following the General Assembly's intervention, the two congregations united on 4 July 1948. The united congregation adopted the name "Highland Church" and used the St Columba's buildings. Like its predecessors, the united congregation had no territorial parish but a charge to all Gaelic-speakers in Edinburgh.

=== Last years and legacy ===
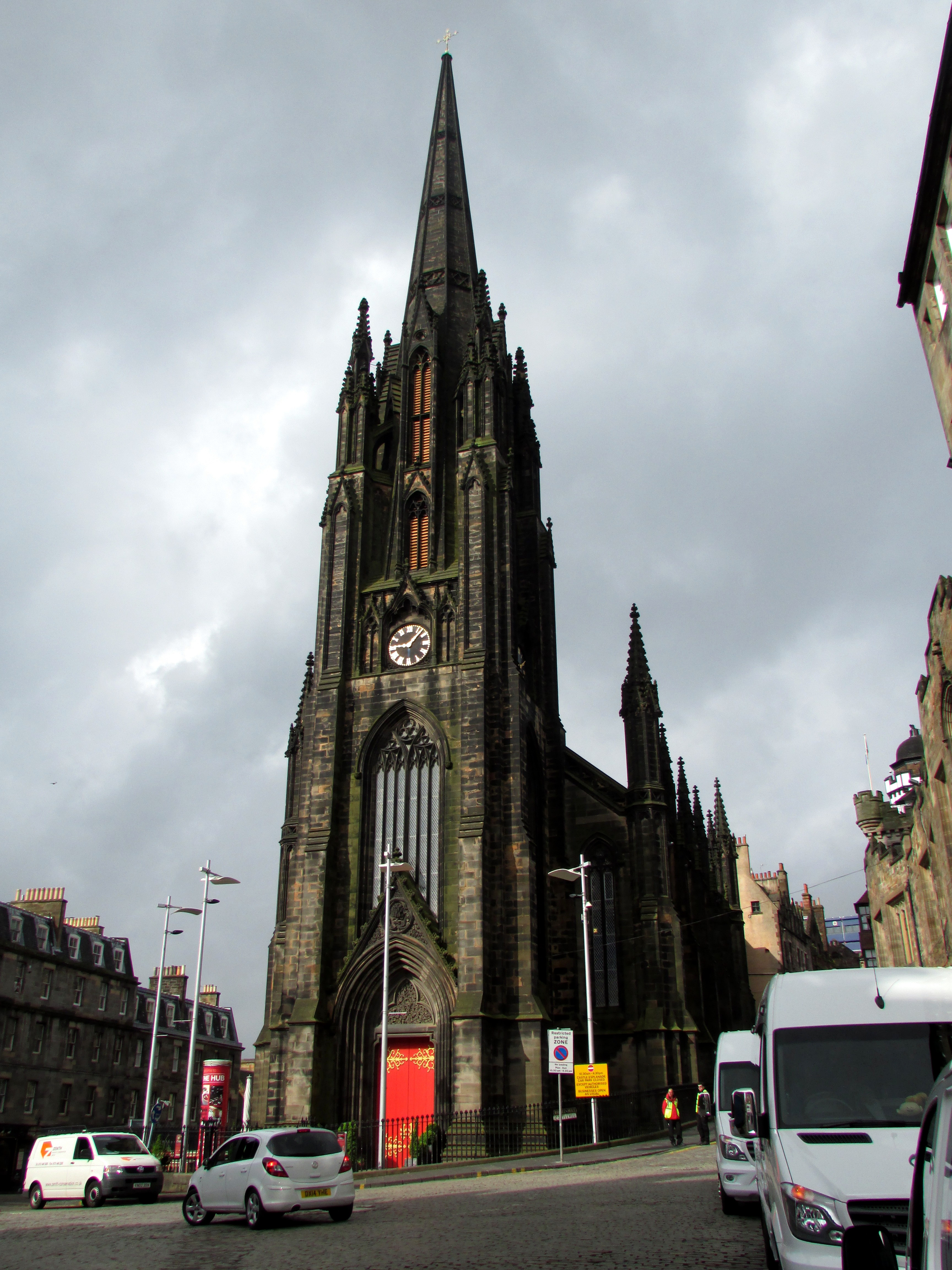
Tolbooth St John's, with which the Highland Church united in 1956

By 1951, the English service was more popular than the Gaelic. By this period, Tollcross and the Old Town were – like most of central Edinburgh – experiencing population decline and, with it, a lessening demand for church accommodation. In this context, the presbytery concluded Gaelic worship could be continued effectively if the Gaelic congregation united with an English-speaking parish church. The united Gaelic congregation continued for only 8 years before uniting with Tolbooth St John's, nearby in the Old Town.

The united congregation used Tolbooth St John's building at Castlehill. The Highland Church's Cambridge Street building was sold in 1956 and converted into offices for the Edinburgh Festival Society. It later became the Little Lyceum: a theatre studio attached to the neighbouring Lyceum Theatre. The building was demolished in 1989. The Saltire Court development, incorporating the Traverse Theatre, was constructed on the site and opened in 1992.

John MacLeod, the last minister of the Highland Church became the first minister of the united charge of Highland, Tolbooth, St John's. Since Highland, Tolbooth, St John's united with Greyfriars Kirk in 1979, the latter congregation has held a weekly Gaelic service, maintaining St Oran's tradition of Gaelic worship in Edinburgh.

== Ministers ==
The following ministers served the Gaelic Free Church, Lothian Road Gaelic Free Church, St Columba's Gaelic Free Church, St Columba's Gaelic United Free Church, St Columba's Gaelic Church, and the Highland Church:

1843–1849 James Noble
1849–1886 Thomas McLauchlan
1884–1895 Peter MacFarlane MacDonald
1897–1930 Malcolm MacLennan
1931–1948 Angus MacMillan
1949–1956 John MacLeod

== Building ==
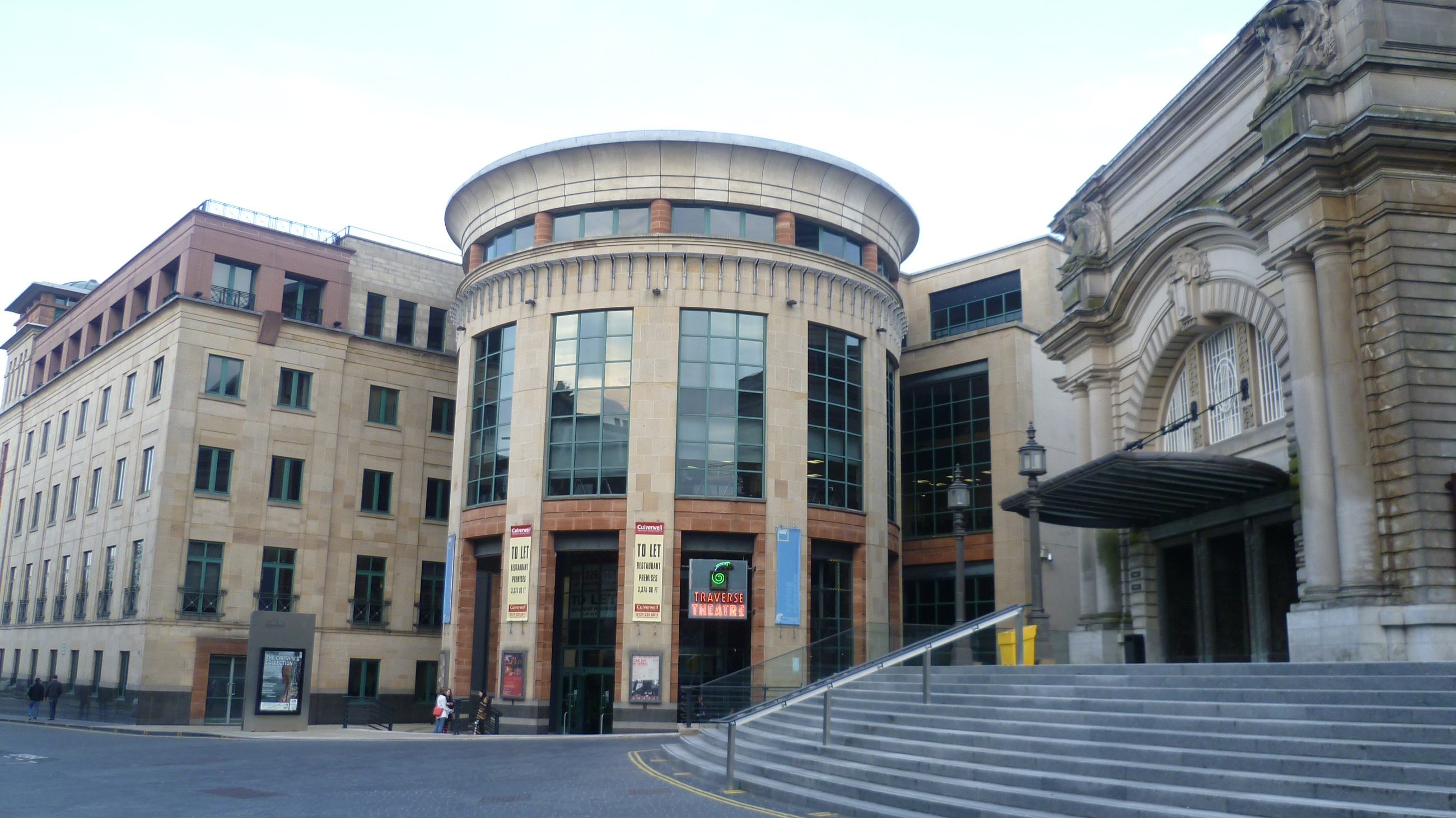
The Traverse Theatre, constructed on the site of the Highland Church; the Usher Hall is visible on the right

St Columba's was designed in the Early English style by Patrick Wilson and constructed by James Lind. The total cost was £2,121 14s. It was completed in 1851 with seats for 1,000 worshippers. The church was a simple building on a rectangular plan and under a pitched roof. The facade, a steep gable, consisted of three bays and was flanked by pinnacle-topped buttresses. The outer bays each contained a simple lancet window while the central bay, flanked by two taller pinnacles on buttresses, incorporated a window of three clustered lancets above a central lancet door, framed within a gable. The side consisted of five bays, each pierced by a lancet and separated by buttresses. The rear wall incorporated a rose window.

Ahead of the construction, Lord Breadalbane gifted 14,000 slates from Easdale and the women of the congregation raised funds for furnishings, including a clock. A renovation of 1893 included the addition of extra accommodation in the gallery, a hot water heating system, and new lighting. An organ was added in 1924 and extensive repairs, including the installation of electric lighting, were undertaken in 1928.

Following the First World War, a war memorial tablet with the names of the fallen was erected in the vestibule. This is now housed in Greyfriars Kirk. A bronze tablet dedicated to the church's former minister Malcolm MacLennan was erected in the vestibule after his death in 1931. A communion table and chairs were gifted by Angus MacMillan, ahead of his departure in 1948. These were supplemented by a matching font and reading desk, gifted by the children of the congregation. The same year, the congregation purchased a new organ as a memorial to those members of the congregation fallen in the Second World War.

=== Plate ===
Ahead of the Free congregation's move to Cambridge Street, new plate was among items purchased with funds raised by women of the congregation. In 1844, the congregation was gifted a baptismal bowl, followed by two silver communion cups in 1855.
