= Patrick MacFarlan =

Scottish minister

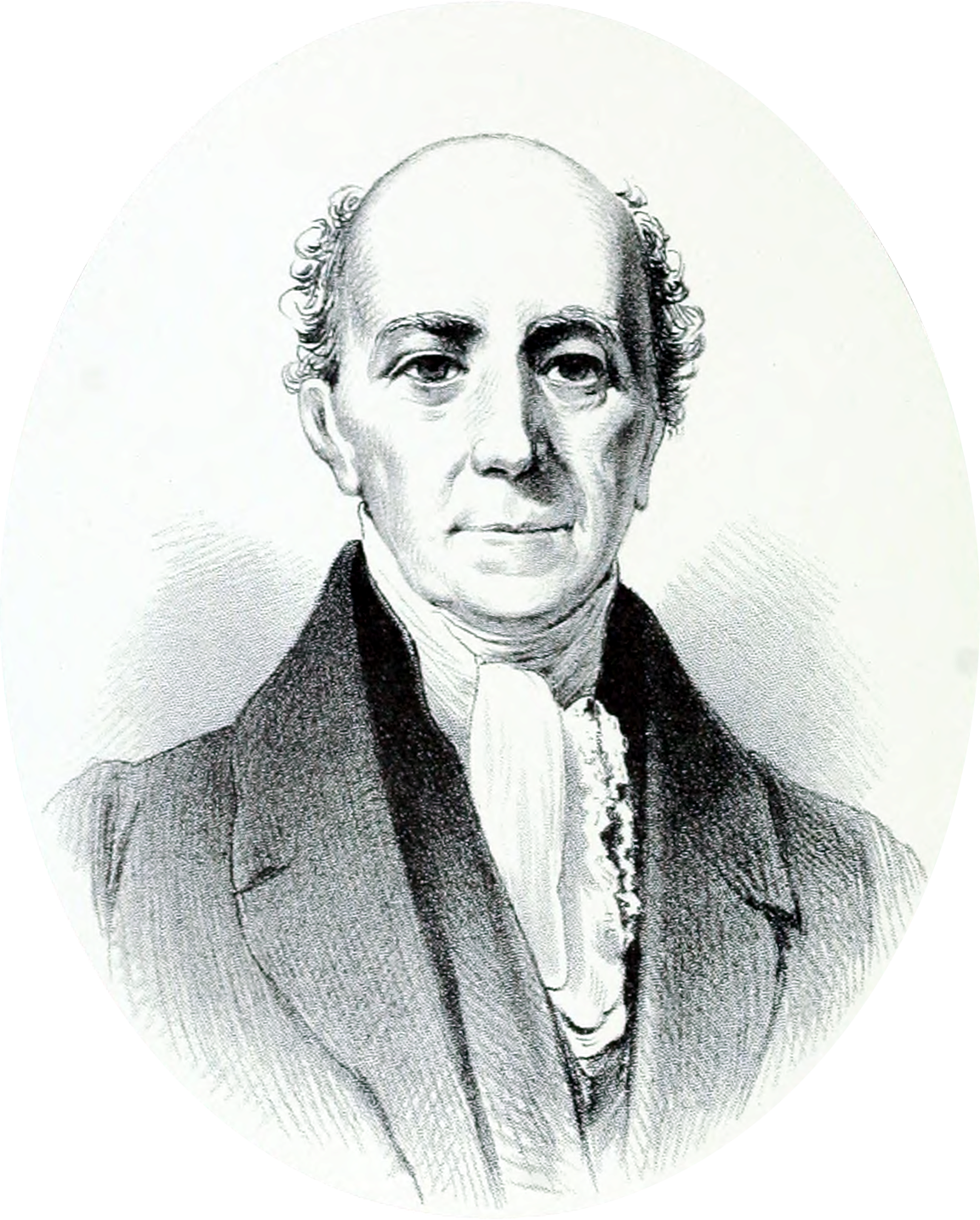
- Patrick MacFarlan from Disruption Worthies
- Church: Greenock

Personal details
- Born: 4 April 1781
- Died: 13 November 1849 (aged 68)

minister of Kippen
- In office 4 September 1806 – 13 July 1810

minister of Polmont
- In office 13 July 1810 – 29 July 1824

minister of St. John's, Glasgow
- In office 29 July 1824 – 24 November 1825

minister of St Enoch's, Glasgow
- In office 24 November 1825 – 27 July 1832

minister of West Parish, Greenock
- In office 27 July 1832 – 18 May 1843

minister of West Free Church, Greenock
- In office 1843 – 13 November 1849

Moderator of the General Assembly of the Church of Scotland
- In office 22 May 1834 – close

Moderator of the General Assembly of the Free Church of Scotland
- In office 22 May 1845 – close

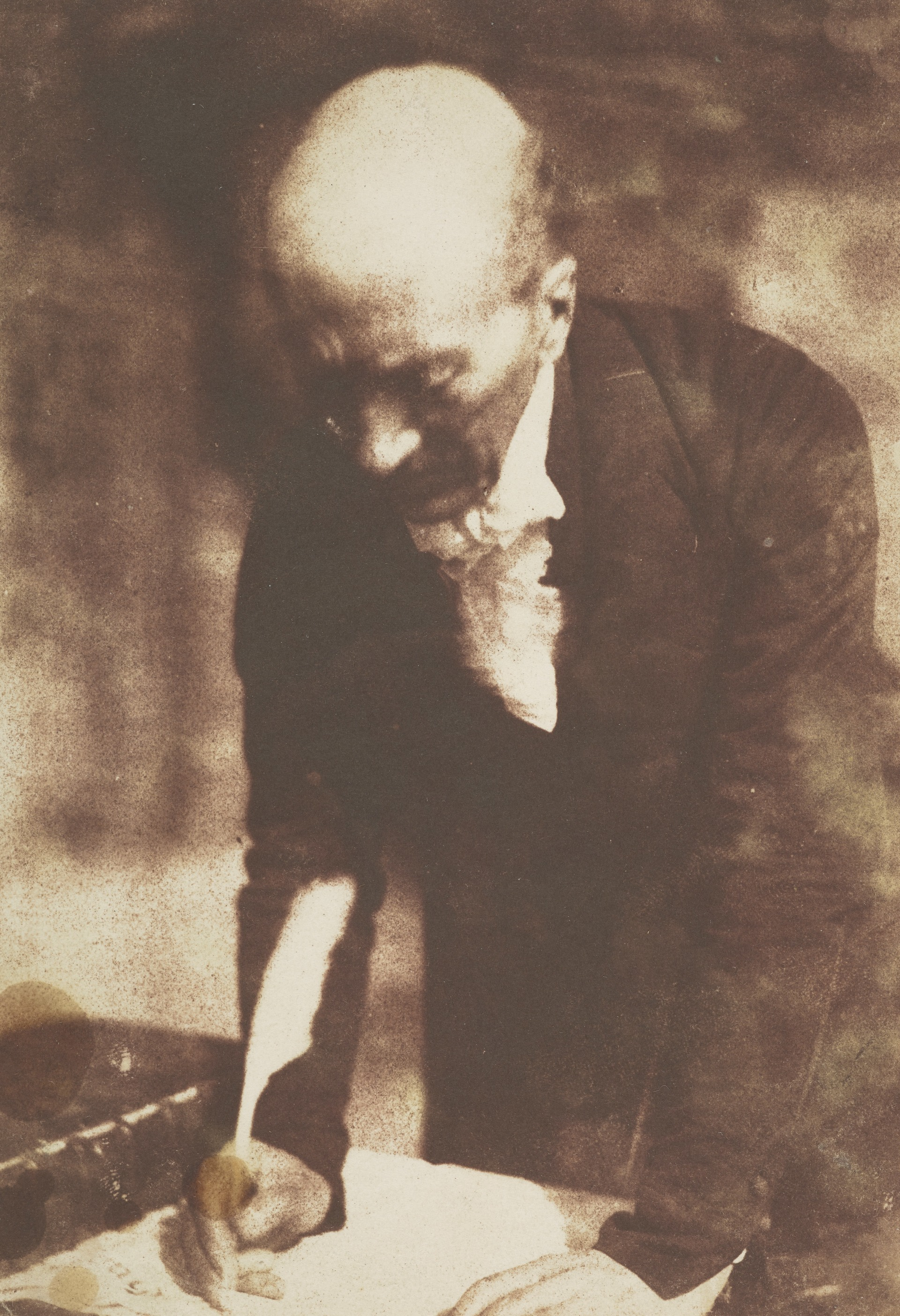
Macfarlane; signing of the Deed of Demission (23 May 1843) This photograph by Adamson and Hill formed the centrepiece of the enormous Disruption painting which now hangs in the Edinburgh Theological Seminary.

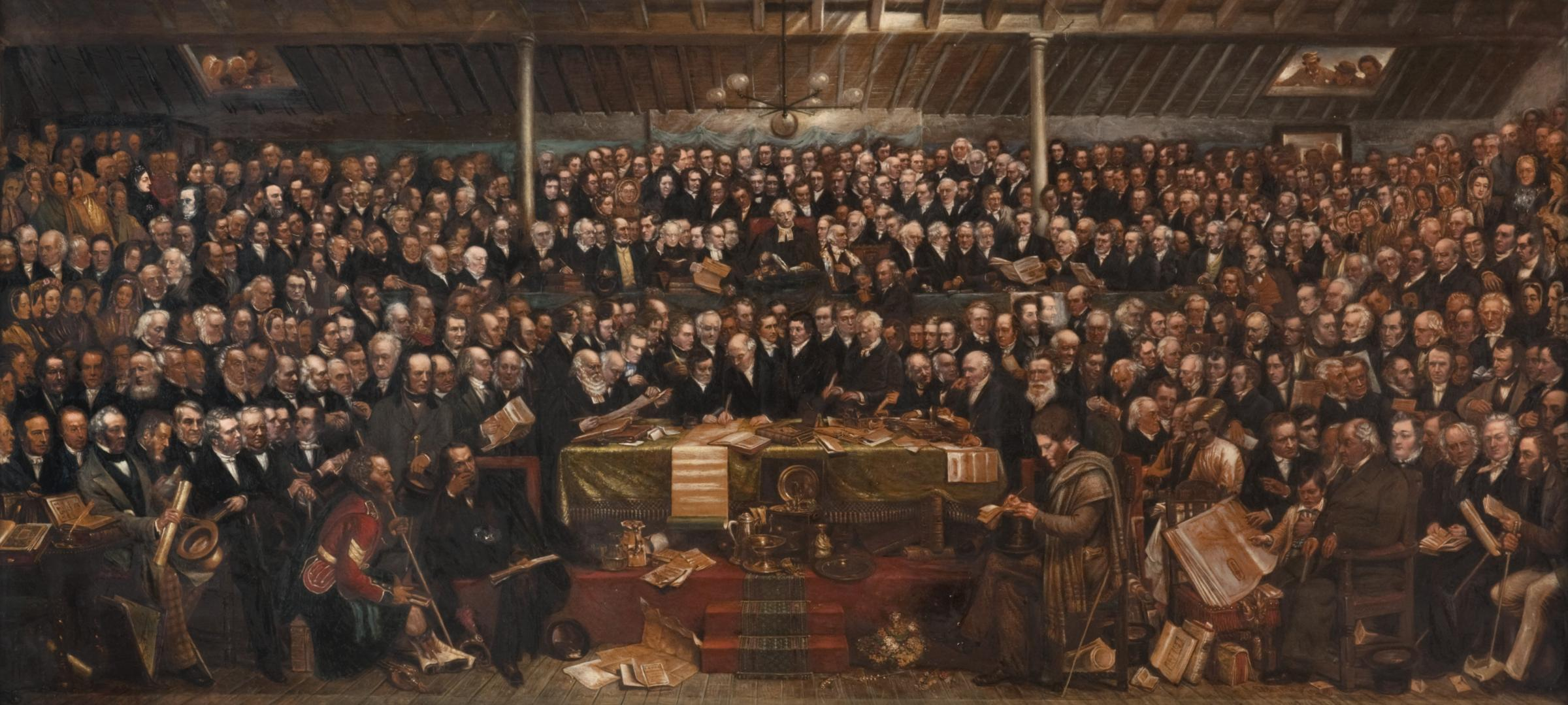
The Disruption Assembly by David Octavius Hill

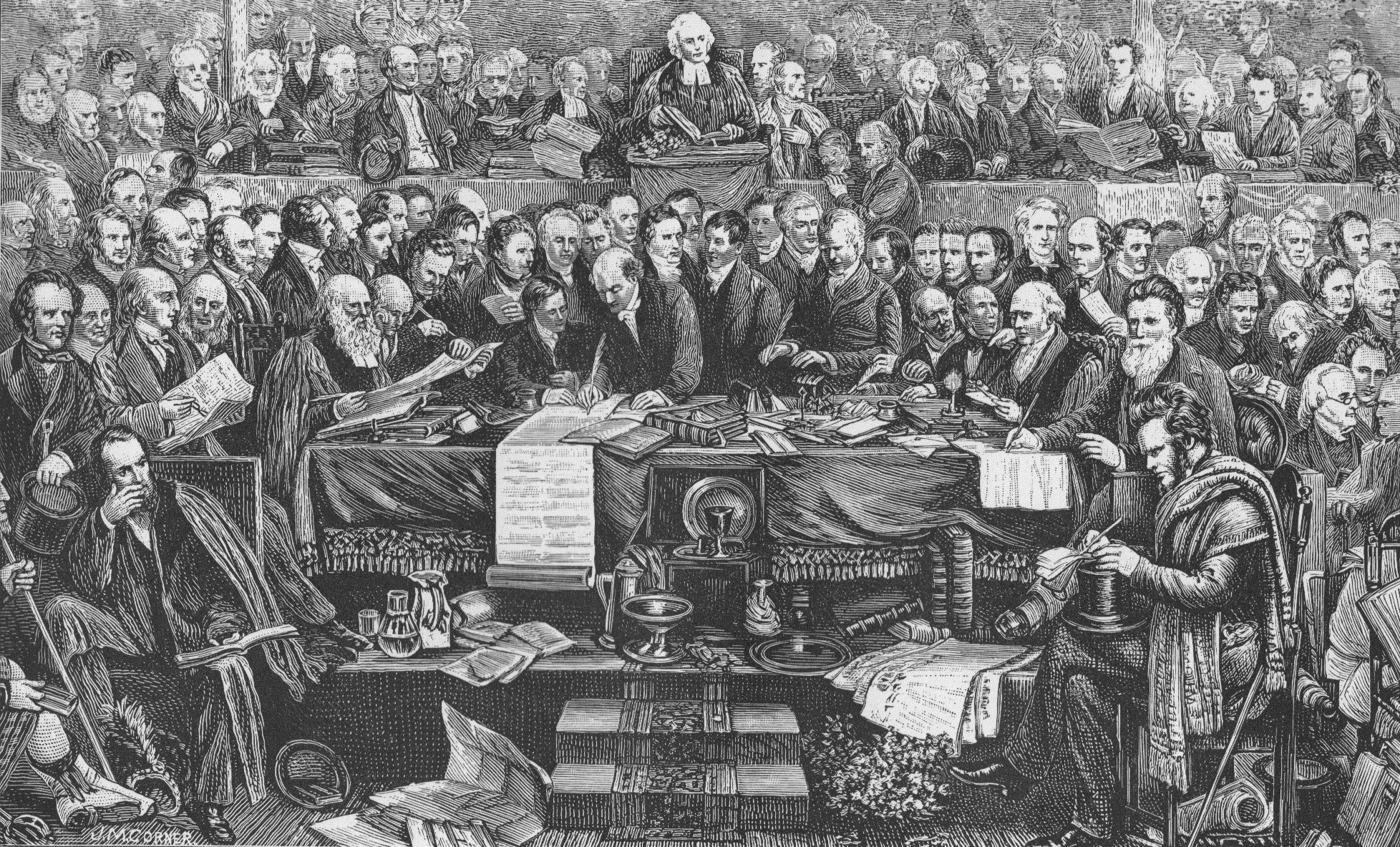
Signing The Deed Of Demission; Patrick Macfarlan is central with a quill pen. This painting, only a fraction of which is shown, was one of the first ever to be supported by the emerging art of photography

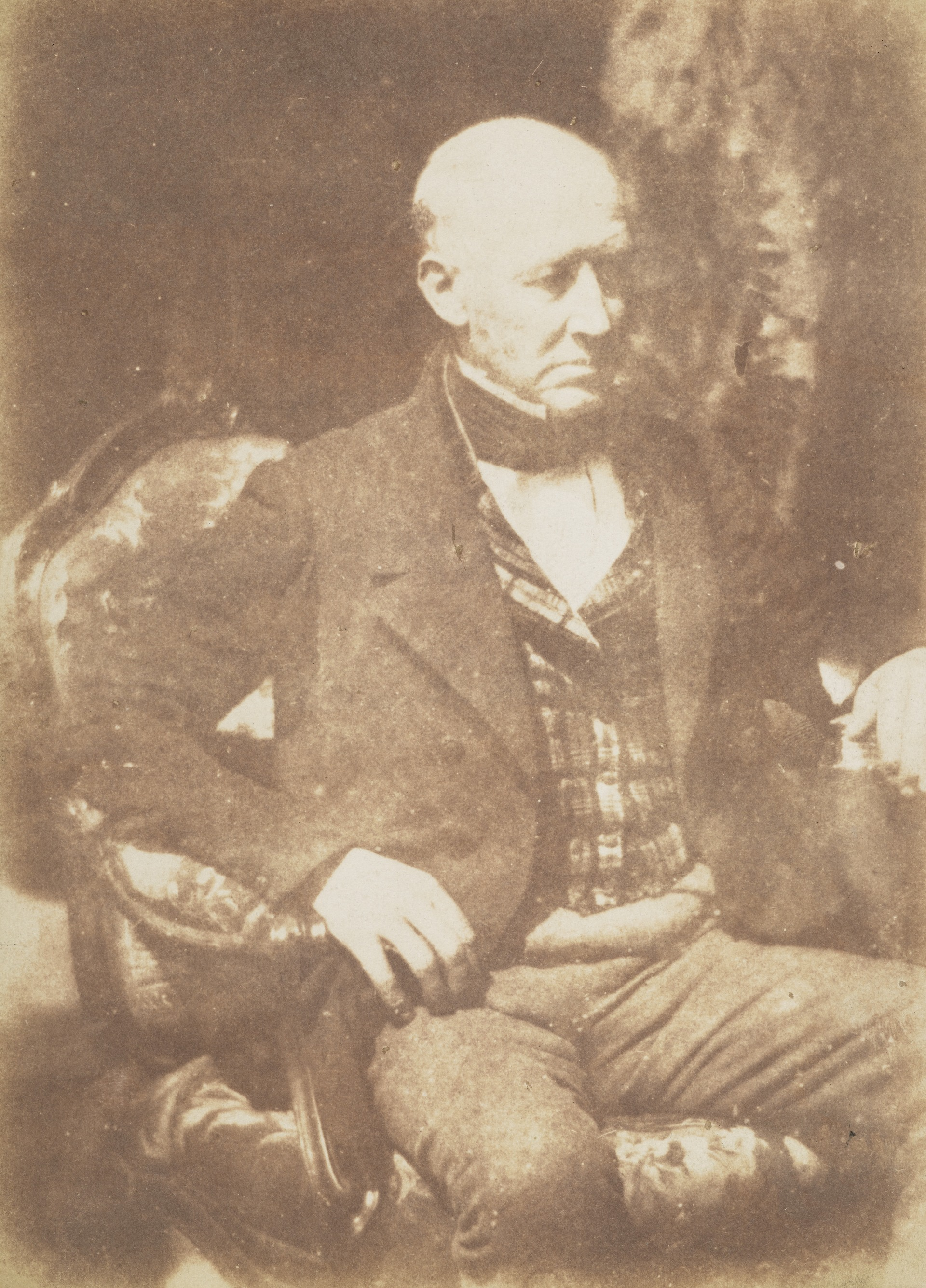
Unknown man (possibly Rev. Patrick MacFarlan, 1781 - 1849. of Greenock)

Patrick MacFarlan (4 April 1781 – 13 November 1849) was a Scottish minister who served as Moderator of the General Assembly of the Church of Scotland in 1834 and as Moderator of the General Assembly of the Free Church of Scotland in 1845.

== Early life and education ==
He was born in Canongate manse on the Royal Mile in Edinburgh on 4 April 1781, the second son of Helen Macdowall and her husband, John MacFarlan (formerly known as John Warden, 1740–1788). Patrick's father, who was minister of the second charge at Canongate Kirk, changed his name on succeeding to the estate of Balancleroch, Campsie. He died when Patrick was only seven years old. One of his forebears, John Warden, merchant, Falkirk, was a zealous persecutor of the Covenanters. Patrick was the youngest of a large family; his brother John, an advocate, was a friend of Thomas Muir. Patrick's grandfather, John, was also a minister in Stirlingshire - at Campsie. Patrick was educated at the High School in Edinburgh, then studied divinity at the University of Edinburgh.

== Early ministry ==
He was licensed as a minister in the Church of Scotland in 1803. His first appointment was to Kippen in the presbytery of Dunblane in Stirlingshire. In 1810 he was translated to Polmont Parish Church near Falkirk. The high position he now occupied in the estimation of the Church, was shown by his appointment in 1824 as successor to Thomas Chalmers in St John's parish in Glasgow. After two years, however, finding it too heavy a burden, he removed to St Enoch's parish in 1825, where he ministered for several years to a large and influential congregation. At this time he was living at Garnet Hill in Glasgow. In 1830 the University of Edinburgh awarded him with an honorary doctorate (DD).

== During the ten years' conflict ==
He was examined before the Committee of the House of Commons on the Patronage Question, 20 and 25 March 1834. At the time of his being elected moderator in 1834 he was minister of the West Kirk in Greenock and in that town he continued his ministerial labours for seventeen years, until his death. In 1835 he was succeeded as moderator by William Aird Thomson. At the 1834 Assembly, the Veto Act was passed, and the conflict was begun, which ended in the Disruption.

At a public meeting in Greenock, in December 1839, having set forth the position in which the Church was placed, he concluded as follows : —

"'Oh!' say some well-intentioned people, 'just submit to the deliverance of the civil courts. It is really painful to think of this contention; you will tear the country and the church in pieces; just submit.' Now I do not understand this whining. To me it seems sheer nonsense. It is just saying, ' We conjure you to sacrifice your consciences, and all your views of duty, and all your sense of obligation to the authority of Christ, as the great Head of the Church. Do sacrifice these on the altar of expediency, and make a low bow of submission to the Court of Session.' For myself I answer, I will not yield : If you ask why, I reply, Because I cannot. "It has pleased God in His providence to fill me, as far as stipend is concerned, a fuller cup than has fallen to many of my brethren; but this I say, and say it advisedly, so help me God— holding the views I entertain of this subject, and regarding it as impossible, without a sacrifice of conscience, to submit to and acquiesce in that decree to which I have referred, I would rather cast that cup to the ground than I would taste it again, embittered, as it would be if I were to yield, by the consciousness of having deserted what I believe to be my duty to God, and my duty to the Church."

In the Assemblies of 1840 and 1841 Dr M'Farlan took a leading part, especially in the discussion on Lord Aberdeen's Bill, and in the various proceedings connected with the case of the Strathbogie ministers.

== At the Disruption ==
In the Disruption of 1843 he left the established church to join the Free Church of Scotland.

MacFarlan took a leading part in the campaign against Pluralities, and in the pre-Disruption controversy, making notable contributions to its literature. He was first to sign the Deed of Demission, and as such was made the centre of the Disruption painting. M'Farlan's position and the attitude he maintained attracted special attention, on the part both of friends and opponents, for the simple reason, that the west parish of Greenock was, at that time, the richest living in the Church of Scotland.

== After the Disruption ==
After the Disruption, M'Farlan continued for more than six years to minister to a numerous congregation. In the Free Church at large, he held a prominent place, and exerted very great influence. He was called to the Moderator's chair in the Assembly of 1845, presiding both at its ordinary meeting in May, and its special meeting at Inverness in August. At the adjourned Assembly in Inverness MacFarlan was assisted, for the Gaelic-speaking public, by John MacDonald, Ferintosh. He was succeeded as Moderator of the General Assembly by Robert James Brown.

== Death and legacy ==
His death took place at Greenock, after a short but severe illness, on 13 November 1849, in the sixty-ninth year of his age. It has been noted that he was the fourth in a succession of ministers, continued from father to son, since the time of the Revolution. In the ministry of the Free Church, he was succeeded by his son, John M'Farlan of the Free Middle Church, Greenock, and his grandson, Andrew Melville of Free St Enoch's, Glasgow.

== Family ==
On 8 January 1808 he married Katharen or Catherine Clason (1786–21 December 1815 aged 31), daughter of Robert Clason of Logie Kirk, south of Dunblane. Katharen's brother was Patrick Clason, Moderator in 1848/9. Patrick and Katharen had issue —

- Ann, born 11 April 1810, died 25 November 1831
- Helen, born 17 June 1811
- Catherine, born 21 June 1813 (married Alexander Melville, minister of Falkirk), died at Paris, 25 February 1866
- John, serving in Monkton and Middle Free Church Greenock, born 2 May 1815, died 18 December 1891.

== Publications ==
- A Benediction of the Church of Scotland (1850)
- The Auchterarder Case
- The Rights of Dissenters
- Six Sermons (Glasgow, 1825; Edinburgh, 1846)
- Strictures on the Rev. Greville Swing's Speech (Glasgow, 1827)
- Answer to Remarks . . . by the Rev. Greville Ewing, and to Mr M'Gavin's Letter (Glasgow, 1827)
- The Sins of Youth. The Subjects of Mournful Recollections in Later Years (Glasgow, 1846)
- Thoughts on Popular Election, Patronage, and Calls (Edinburgh, 1833)
- Letters to the People of Scotland (Edinburgh, 1835)
- Lecture on Candour in the Investigation of Religious Truth (Edinburgh, 1842)
- A Letter to the Friends of the Established Church (Edinburgh, 1842)
- Supplementary Letter to the Friends of the Established Church (Edinburgh, 1842)
- Address at the Opening of the General Assembly of the Free Church (Edinburgh, 1845)
- The Past and Present State of Evangelical Religion in Switzerland (Edinburgh, 1845)
- The Gospel Ministry Fund essential to the Maintenance and Extension of the Free Church (Greenock, 1848)
- A Vindication of the Church of Scotland (London, 1850)
- edited Warden's Essay on the Lord's Supper (Leith, 1808) and Thomas Brown's Sermons (Glasgow, 1849)

== See also ==
- Works by or about Patrick MacFarlan at the Internet Archive
