= John Macdonald (Apostle of the North) =

Scottish minister

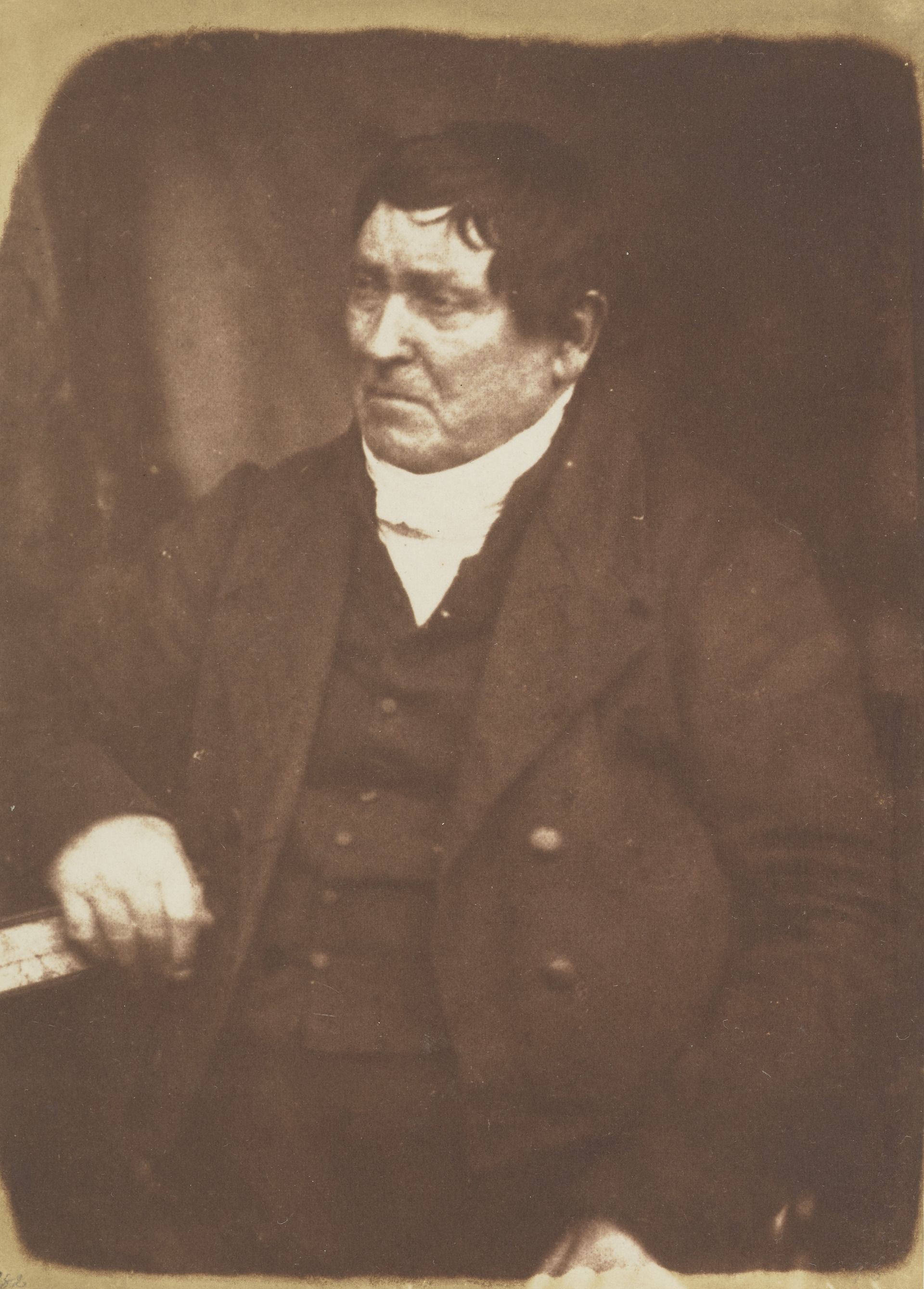
- John Macdonald of Ferintosh

Personal details
- Born: 1779
- Died: 1849 (aged 69–70)

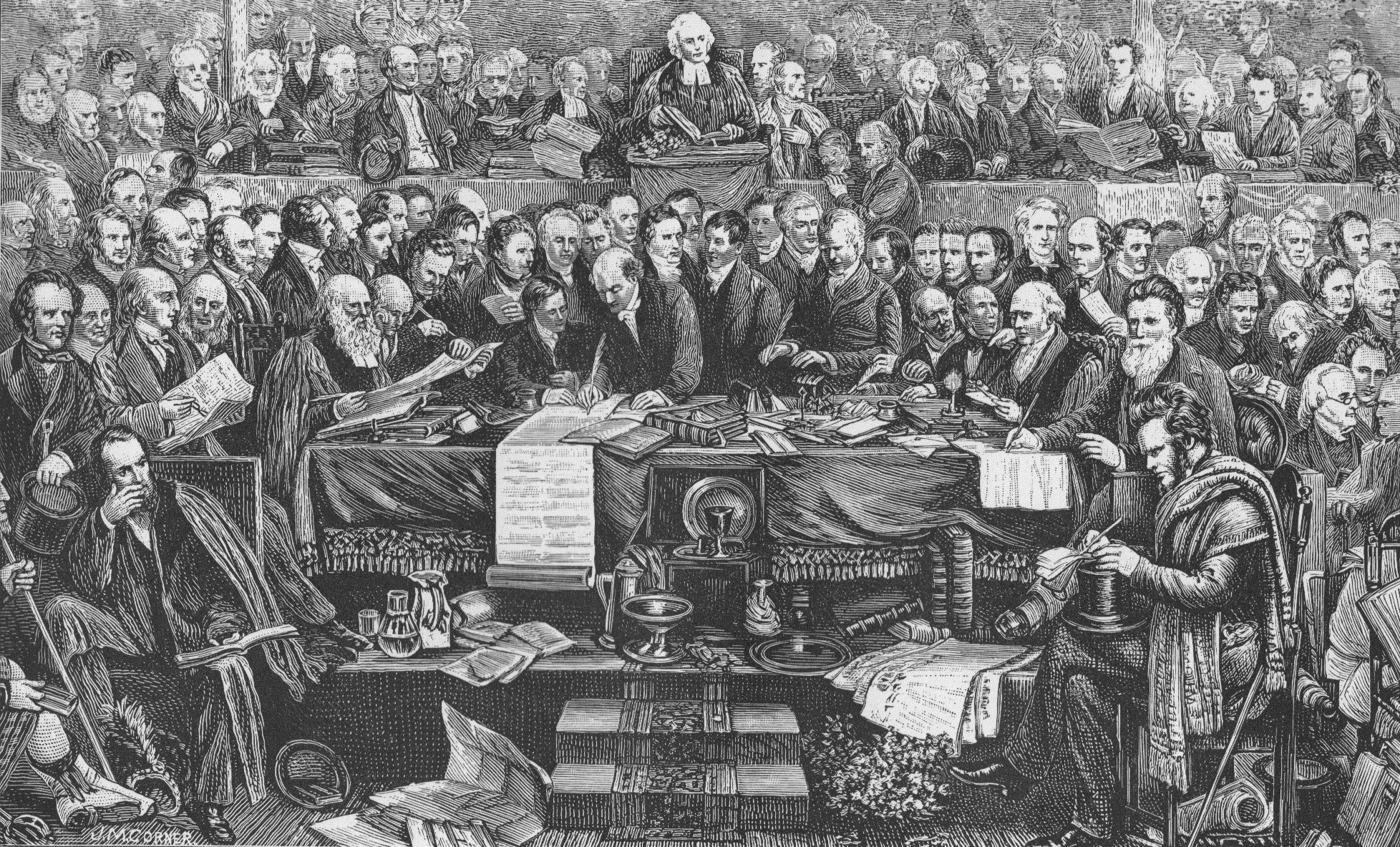
Signing The Deed Of Demission Macdonald is shown behind Patrick Macfarlan who is central with a quill pen.

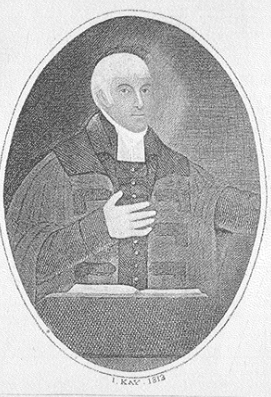
The Rev John MacDonald of the Gaelic Chapel as portrayed by John Kay

John Macdonald (1779–1849) was a Scottish minister known in Scotland as the Apostle of the North. He is also remembered for his visits and descriptions of life on St Kilda.

== Early life and education ==
He was born at Balnabein near Reay on the north coast of Scotland on 12 November 1779. His father was a weaver and catechist.

He was educated at Reay parish school (a church school) then studied Divinity and Mathematics at King's College, Aberdeen, graduating MA in March 1801. He is said to have been the best mathematician in Scotland. He was licensed to preach by the Presbytery Church of Scotland in Caithness in 1805.

He began working as an assistant minister at Kingussie then did mission work at Berriedale.

== In Edinburgh ==
In January 1807 he went to the Gaelic Chapel on Castle Wynd in Edinburgh to replace James McLachlan. During his time in Edinburgh he lived at Ramsay Gardens close to the chapel. During his Edinburgh ministry an attempt was made to introduce English preaching in the afternoon into the Gaelic congregation, to meet the wishes of hundreds who wished to benefit by Macdonald's ministry; but the more ardent Celts among the people resisted the change strenuously and successfully. To meet the desire, however, Macdonald resolved to preach English at night,— thus undertaking three regular services each Lord's day. With week-day meetings and visitations, this made his life a busy one.

== In Urquhart ==
In July 1813, at the wishes of Duncan Forbes of Culloden, he was translated to Urquhart. In 1818 he was discussed by the General Assembly of the Church of Scotland regarding his apparent unwanted preaching in the parishes of Aberlour and Strathbogie. This case attracted much public interest.

== On St Kilda ==
In 1822 he made a mission voyage to the island of St Kilda, seeking to address its absence of church and minister. He spent two weeks on the island together with his friend Mr McLellan. He made a very detailed account of the inhabitants and the island. He made three further visits to the island, 1825, 1827 and 1830, making a detailed journal of each visit. Besides these visits, so much valued by the people, he made strenuous efforts to secure the erection of a church and manse in the island, and on his last visit, in 1827, accompanied by the minister appointed by the Society which he represented, he found the buildings completed, and provision made for the regular maintenance of Christian worship. For many years the Free Church maintained a minister on the island.

In 1842 the University of New York awarded him an honorary Doctor of Divinity (DD).

== At the Disruption ==
At the Disruption of 1843 he left the Church of Scotland to join the Free Church of Scotland. He was selected to preach the very first Free Church sermon at Tanfield Hall in Edinburgh. He is pictured in the Disruption Assembly picture just behind Patrick MacFarlan.

== After the Disruption ==
His charge at Urquhart changed slightly and he served the new Free Church in nearby Ferintosh. He was not in the habit of referring often to ecclesiastical subjects in the pulpit; but, preaching at Edinburgh, in the Gaelic Church, soon after the Disruption, he said of the Established Church as it then existed, that it was "a Christ-denying, God-dishonouring, and soul-destroying Church." He was much censured for saying this, but it does not appear that he ever withdrew, or even modified them afterwards.

In the August General Assembly of the Free Church in 1845 Macdonald served as Gaelic Moderator in Inverness with Patrick MacFarlan as English-speaking Moderator (the more critical role). Alexander Beith commented on the sweetness of his voice despite a life-long tobacco habit.

He died on 16 April 1849.

== Family ==
He married:

- (1) 6 January 1806, Georgina (died 18 August 1814), daughter of Simon Ross of Gledfield, and had issue —
  - John, missionary of the Church of Scotland in India, born 16 February 1807, died 1837
  - Simon, born 23 September 1808, died abroad
  - Margaret Henderson, born 12 August 1810 (married Duncan Campbell, minister of Kiltearn)
- (2) 11 May 1818, Jessie (died 22 June 1868), daughter of Kenneth Mackenzie of Millbank, and had issue —
  - Anne, born 28 August 1820
  - Agnes, born 11 August 1821 (married Alexander Falconer, Sheriff - substitute of Nairn), died 19 January 1914
  - James, born 25 August 1822
  - Kenneth, born 25 September 1823
  - Divie Bethune, born 20 October 1824
  - Duncan G. Forbes, born 9 September 1825
  - Alexander, born 1 November 1826, died 14 March 1827.

== Publications ==
- The Righteousness of God manifested for the Justification of Sinners, a sermon (Edinburgh, 1825)
- Journal of his visits to St Kilda in 1822, 1825, 1827, and 1830
- Marbhrann air Maighster Eoin Robeson (Inverness, 1829)
- Daoine air an Comhairleachadh an Aghaidh bhi deanadh cron orra fein (the cholera sermon) (Inverness, 1832)
- Dan Spioradail a rinneadh air Criosdaidh Araidh (Edinburgh, 1838)
- Marbhrann a rinneadh air Diadhairibh urramack nach mairionn (Edinburgh, 1848, 1858, 1868, 1890)
- Elegies on Eminent Ministers of the Church in Gaelic (Edinburgh, 1848)Elegies
- Speech in the General Assembly in the Case of Rev. Roderick Macleod (Edinburgh, 1869)

== Artistic recognition ==
He was portrayed around 1810 by the Edinburgh artist John Kay.

== Bibliography ==
- Edin. Christ. Inst
- Scot. Mag., lxxi.
- Elegy on Dr Macdonald (Glasgow, 1862)
- Typographia Scoto-Gadelica, 196-9
