= List of ministers of Greyfriars Kirk =

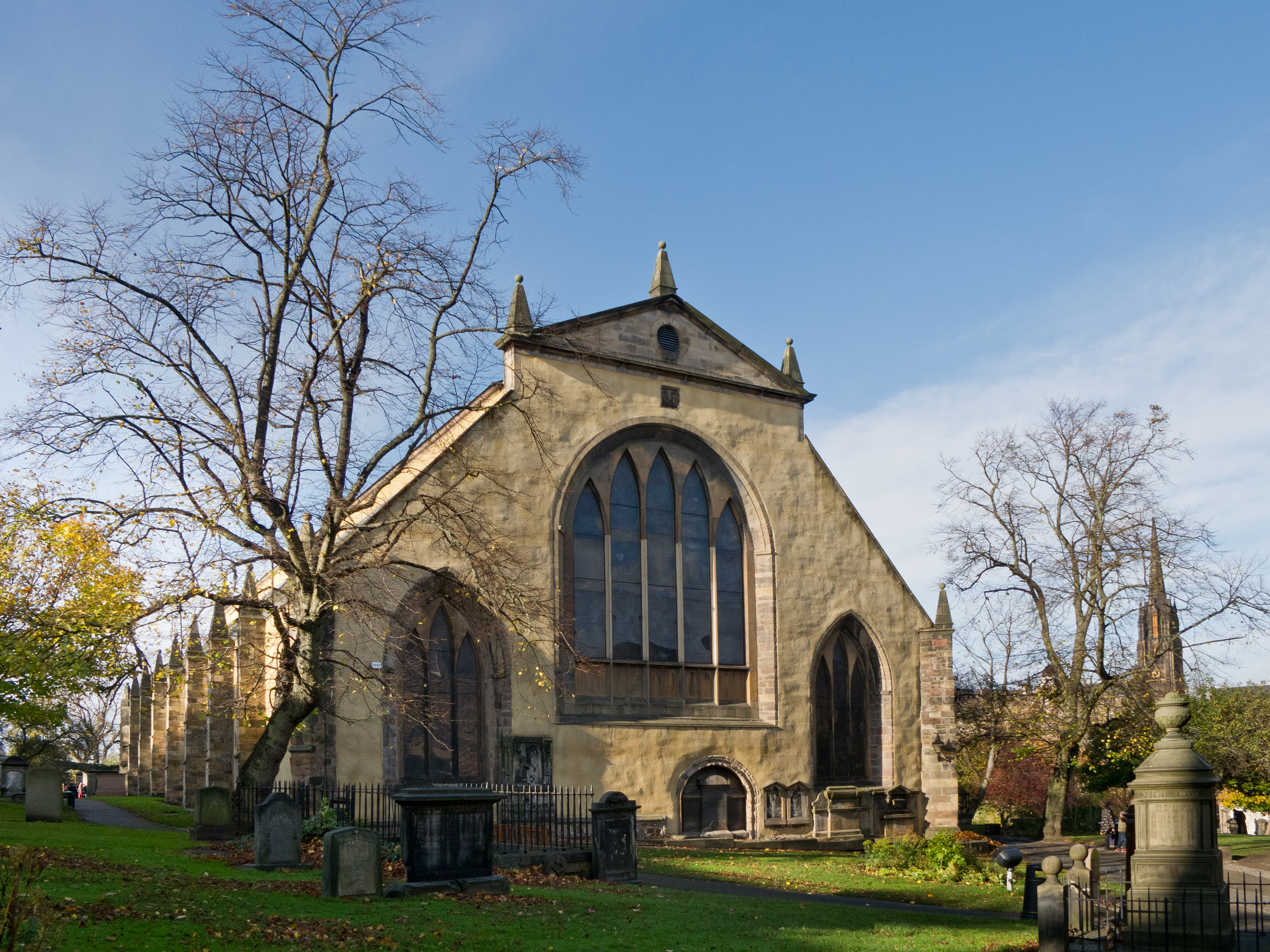
The east end of Greyfriars Kirk

The minister of Greyfriars Kirk is a position within the Church of Scotland's Presbytery of Edinburgh and West Lothian. The most recent minister of Greyfriars Kirk was Richard Frazer, who was admitted in 2003 and retired in 2023. Interim Moderator for the vacant charge is Rev Dr Karen Campbell of Marchmont St Giles. Ministry is currently led by an Associate Minister. Under Presbytery plans, Greyfriars is due to unite with St Cuthbert's Parish Church in 2025.

Greyfriars originated in 1598, when Robert Rollock and Peter Hewat were appointed ministers of the South West Parish of Edinburgh, then meeting in the Upper Tolbooth portion of St Giles’. The charge of Greyfriars continued with two ministers until 1840, when St John's Church, Victoria Street, was erected and the last minister of the second charge, Thomas Guthrie became the first minister of the new church. New Greyfriars was erected in 1722 and occupied the western half of the kirk. It was a sole charge served by one minister. In 1929, the congregations of Old and New Greyfriars united under one minister. Both churches were burgh churches, meaning that the town council held the right to nominate the churches' ministers.

Since the establishment of the South-West Parish in 1598, 75 ministers have served the congregation: 40 in Old Greyfriars, 30 in New Greyfriars, and five in the united charge. Three ministers of Old Greyfriars were elected moderator of the General Assembly of the Church of Scotland during their incumbencies: George Kay in 1755, William Robertson in 1763, John Inglis in 1804. Two ministers of New Greyfriars were elected to this role during their incumbencies: Robert Henry in 1774 and James Nicoll Ogilvie in 1918. In 2003, Alison Elliot, an elder of Greyfriars, was elected to serve as moderator of the 2004 General Assembly. Elliot was the first woman moderator and the first lay person to hold the office since George Buchanan in 1567. Other notable ministers of Greyfriars include the Covenanters, Robert Douglas, Robert Traill, and Gilbert Rule; the statesman, William Carstares; the philanthropist, Thomas Guthrie; and the liturgical reformer, Robert Lee.

== Old Greyfriars ==
The first congregation of Greyfriars began as the South West Parish of Edinburgh, which met in the Upper Tolbooth portion of St Giles'. In 1620, the congregation moved to the newly-built Greyfriars Kirk. The designation Old Greyfriars was adopted after the erection of New Greyfriars in the western half of the Greyfriars building in 1722.

The congregation was served by two ministers until 1840, when St John's Church on Victoria Street was erected and the minister of the collegiate charge, Thomas Guthrie, became the first minister of the new church. Old Greyfriars was a burgh church of the city of Edinburgh, meaning that, until the abolition of patronage in the Church of Scotland in 1874, the town council held the right to nominate the churches' ministers.

=== Ministers of the first charge ===
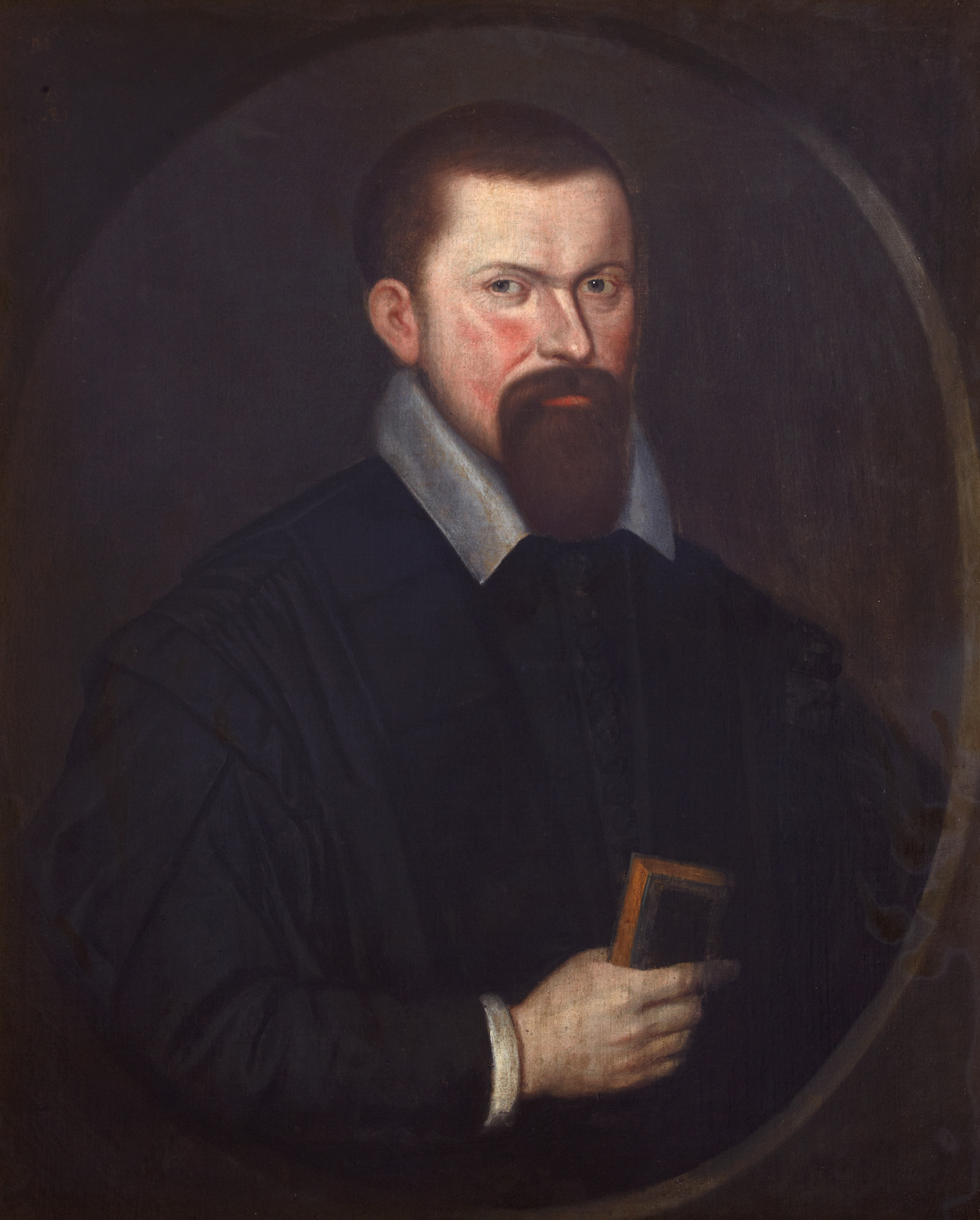
Robert Rollock (1598–1599)

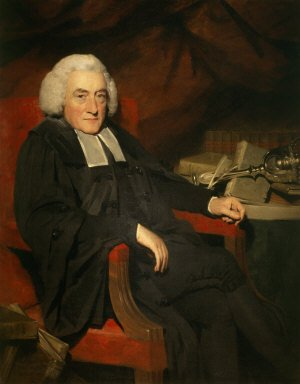
William Robertson (1761–1793)

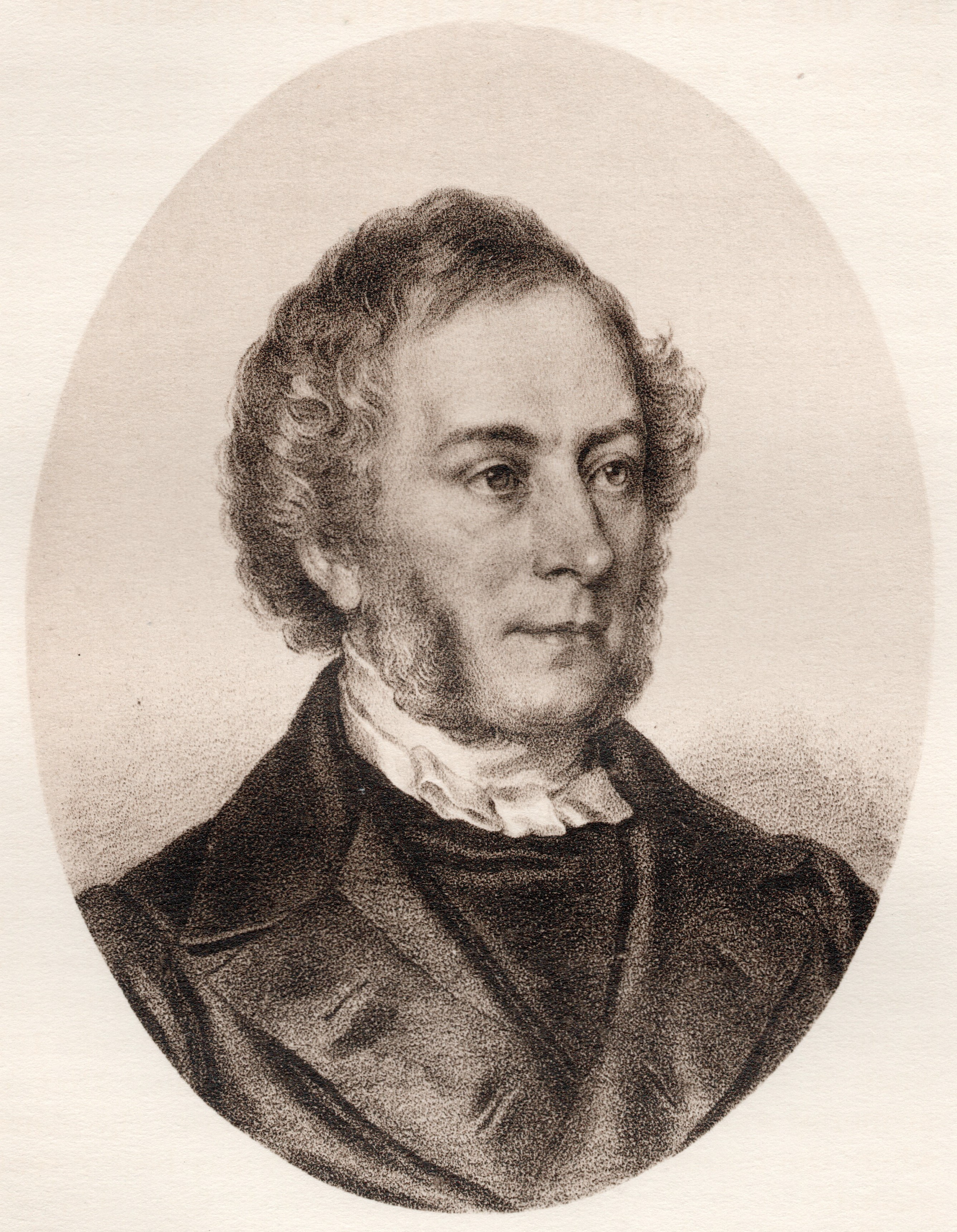
Robert Lee (1843–1868)

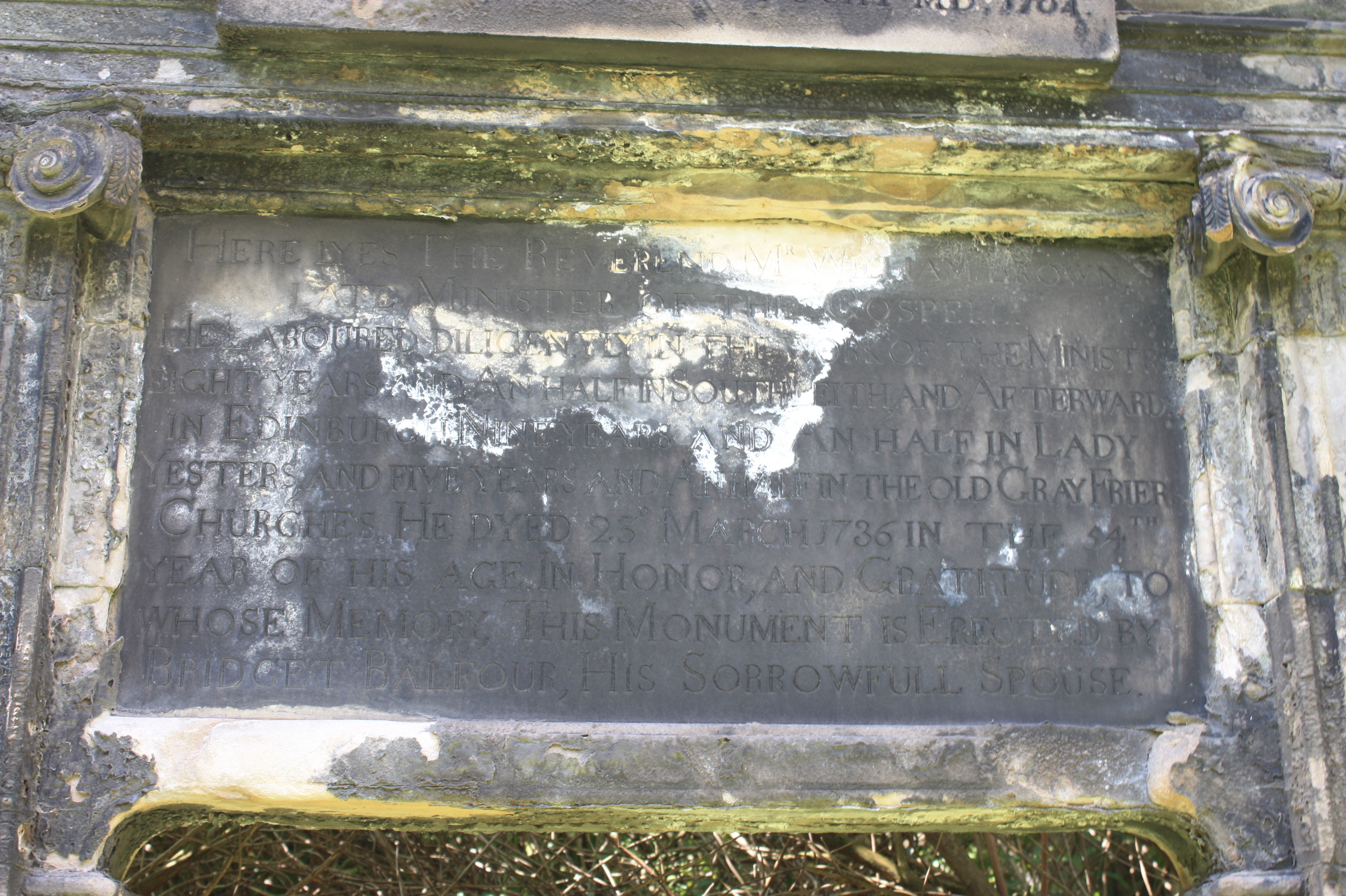
The grave of Rev William Brown (d.1736) Greyfriars Kirkyard (Covenanters Prison)

From	Until	Incumbent	Notes
1598	1599	Robert Rollock	Previously a minister of Edinburgh; admitted, 18 April 1598; died in office, 8 January 1599.
1599	1610	Peter Hewat	Translated from the second charge; appointed, 16 January 1599; removed to Little Kirk, 1610.
1614	1641	Andrew Ramsay	Admitted, 28 April 1614; translated to Old Kirk, (Note: The Old Kirk congregation occupied the central section of St Giles' until its suppression in 1860.) 1640 or 1641. 1614 to 1620 was in St Giles, 1625 to 1641 was in Greyfriars
1642	1647	George Gillespie	Translated from Wemyss; admitted 23 September 1642; translated to the High Kirk, after September 1647.
1649	1662	Robert Traill	Translated form Elie; admitted, 23 March 1649; imprisoned for ten months in Edinburgh Castle for engaging in a new Remonstrance, 23 August 1660; exiled by the Privy Council for high treason, 11 December 1662.
1662		Robert Douglas	Translated from the East Kirk (Note: The "East Kirk" was a name for the congregation meeting in the eastern portion of St Giles', it became known as the High Kirk.) and admitted, 2 June 1662; deprived for rejecting episcopacy, 1 October 1662.
1662	1688	John Robertson	Translated from Dysart; admitted, 6 November 1662; appointed almoner to Charles II, 24 March 1681; died, 11 January 1691.
1689	1701	Gilbert Rule	Called from a congregation in Dublin, 7 December 1688; admitted, 24 July 1689; appointed principal of the University of Edinburgh, 1690; died in office, 7 June 1701.
1702	1729	James Hart	Translated from Ratho; admitted, 20 September 1702; appointed almoner to George I, August 1726; died in office, 10 June 1729.
1730	1736	William Brown	Translated from Lady Yester's and admitted, 23 July 1730; died in office, 23 March 1736.
1736	1745	William Robertson	Translated from Lady Yester's and admitted, 10 October 1736; died in office, 16 November 1745.
1747	1760	James Stevenson	Translated from New Greyfriars and admitted, 24 December 1747; died in office, 17 July 1760.
1761	1793	William Robertson	Translated and admitted from Lady Yester's, 26 November 1761; appointed principal of the University of Edinburgh, 1762; elected moderator of the General Assembly, 26 May 1763; appointed Historiographer Royal, 6 August 1764; died in office, 11 June 1793.
1794	1799	James Finlayson	Translated from Lady Yester's; admitted, 9 January 1794; translated to the High Kirk, 14 March 1799.
1799	1834	John Inglis	Translated from Tibbermore and admitted, 17 October 1799; elected moderator of the General Assembly, 17 May 1804; appointed dean of the Chapel Royal, 23 February 1810; died in office, 2 January 1834.
1834	1843	John Sym	Translated from Sprouston and admitted, 24 September 1834; joined the Free Church, 1843.
1843	1868	Robert Lee	Translated from Campsie and admitted, 9 November 1843; dean of the Chapel Royal, 1846; died in office, 14 March 1868.
1868	1876	Robert Wallace	Translated from Trinity, Edinburgh, and admitted, 26 December 1868; demitted to become editor of the Scotsman, 1 August 1876.
1877	1909	John Glasse	Ordained, 21 March 1877; resigned, 13 October 1909.
1910	1916	Alexander Brown Grant	Translated from Ecclesmachan and admitted, 10 May 1910; translated to Rosneath, 1916.
1917	1928	Samuel Dunlop	Translated from Kilpatrick Irongray; admitted, 1917; died in office, 1928.
In 1929, the charges of Old and New Greyfriars were united.

=== Ministers of the second charge ===
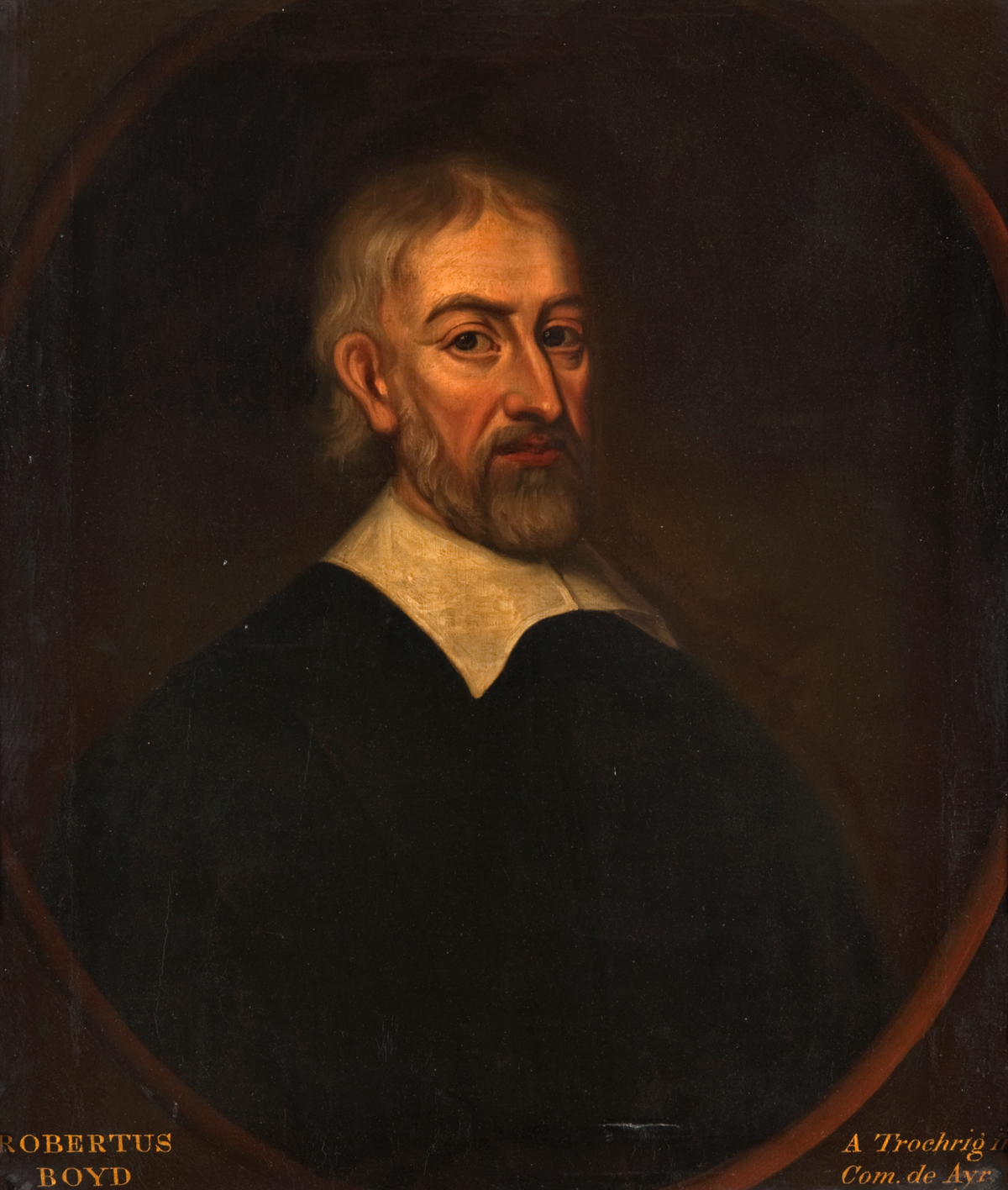
Robert Boyd (1622–1626)

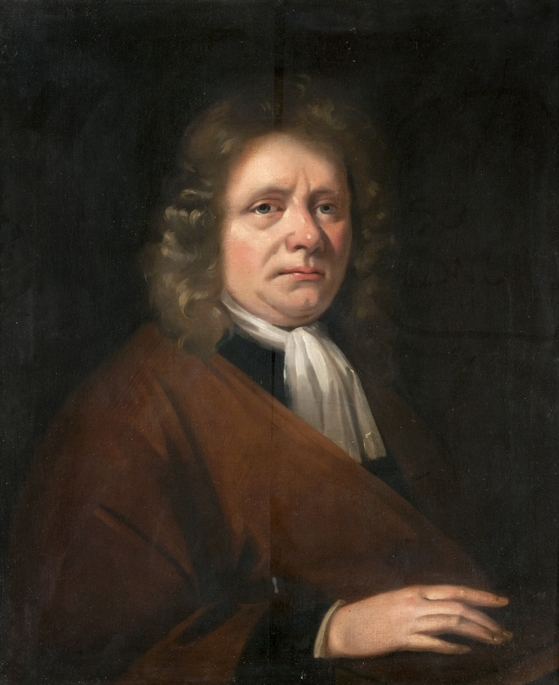
William Carstares (1704–1707)

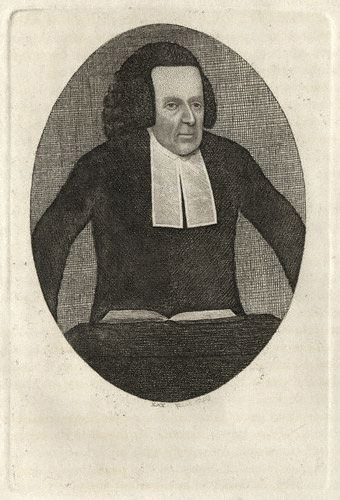
John Erskine (1767–1803)

From	Until	Incumbent	Notes
1598	1599	Peter Hewat	Translated from Colinton; admitted as a minister of Edinburgh before 31 January 1597; readmitted, 18 April 1598; translated to the first charge, 1599.
1620	1622	Patrick Sands	Principal of the University of Edinburgh; appointed, 1 December 1620; demitted, August 1622.
1622	1626	Robert Boyd	Principal of the University of Edinburgh; elected, 18 October 1622; translated to Paisley, 1626.
1626		John Duncanson	Appointed, 16 August 1626.
1630	1637	James Fairlie	Professor of Divinity at the University of Edinburgh; admitted, 17 November 1630; elected to the Bishopric of Argyll and demitted, 28 July 1637.
1644	1660	Mungo Law	Translated from the second charge of Dysart and admitted, 27 March 1644; taken prisoner by the English Army at Alyth, 28 August 1651; returned, January 1653; died in office, February 1660.
1664	1669	David Stirling	Translated from Foulden; elected, 25 May 1664; demitted, 1669.
1669	1672	Alexander Ramsay	Translated from Auchinleck; elected, 8 May 1669; translated to the High Kirk, 1672.
1672	1674	Alexander Irving	Translated from West Kilbride and collated, (Note: "Collated" was the episcopal term for "admitted".) 12 December 1672; demitted Whitsunday, 1674.
1674	1681	Alexander Ramsay	Retranslated from the High Kirk; appointed, 14 June 1674; translated to the Old Kirk, 1681.
1681	1687	Alexander Malcolm	Translated from Newbattle; instituted, 31 March 1681; translated to the Tron Kirk, 1687.
1687	1691	James Hutchison	Translated from North Leith; elected, 11 August 1687; deposed "for contumacy", 1691.
1693	1702	John Hamilton	Translated from Cramond and admitted, 1693; died in office, 17 October 1702.
1704	1707	William Carstares	Principal of the University of Edinburgh; admitted, 8 November 1704; translated to the High Kirk, 28 December 1707.
1711	1715	Matthew Wood	Translated from Leslie; admitted, 18 March 1711; translated to the Tron Kirk, 16 January 1715.
1721	1732	William Millar	Translated from Lady Yester's; admitted, 22 January 1721; appointed dean of the Chapel Royal, 1727; died in office, 18 May 1732.
1732	1749	John Hepburn	Translated from New Greyfriars and admitted, 14 December 1732; appointed almoner to George II, 13 February 1737; died in office, 29 April 1749.
1750	1754	Robert Hamilton	Translated from Lady Yester's and admitted, 6 December 1750; appointed Professor of Divinity at the University of Edinburgh and demitted, 6 February 1754.
1754	1766	George Kay	Translated from New Greyfriars and admitted, 11 October 1754; elected moderator of the General Assembly, 24 May 1755; died in office, 10 April 1766.
1767	1803	John Erskine	Translated from New Greyfriars and admitted, 9 July 1767; died in office, 19 January 1803.
1804	1837	Robert Anderson	Translated from Trinity College Kirk and admitted, 12 January 1804; died in office, 24 January 1837.
1837	1840	Thomas Guthrie	Translated from Arbirlot; admitted, 21 September 1837; translated to St John's Church, 28 October 1840.
On the erection of St John's Church, the charge of Old Greyfriars was uncollegiated.

== New Greyfriars ==
After an explosion destroyed part of Greyfriars in 1718, the town council decided to rebuild the church to accommodate two congregations. The western half of the church was occupied by New Greyfriars, which opened on 31 December 1722. In its earliest days, the congregation was also known as Wester Greyfriars.

Like Old Greyfriars, New Greyfriars was a burgh church and, prior to the abolition of patronage in the Church of Scotland in 1874, the town council held the right to nominated the minister. Unlike Old Greyfriars, the congregation was a sole charge served by one minister. The town council often appointed promising ministers to the sole charge of New Greyfriars on the understanding that they would be promoted to one of the city's two-charge churches soon afterwards. For this reason, many ministers of New Greyfriars served relatively short incumbencies.

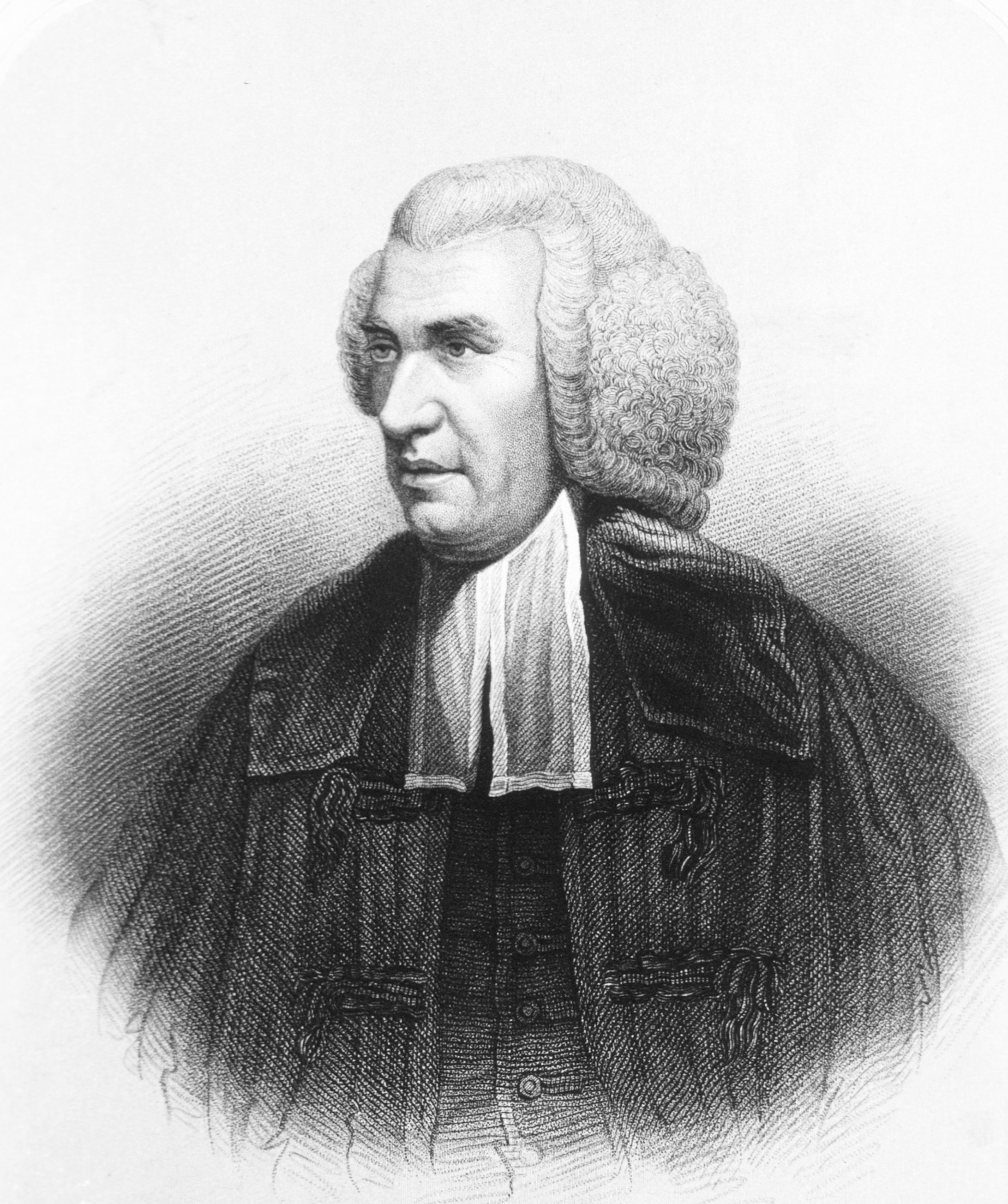
Robert Henry (1768–1776)

Andrew Hunter (1779–1786)

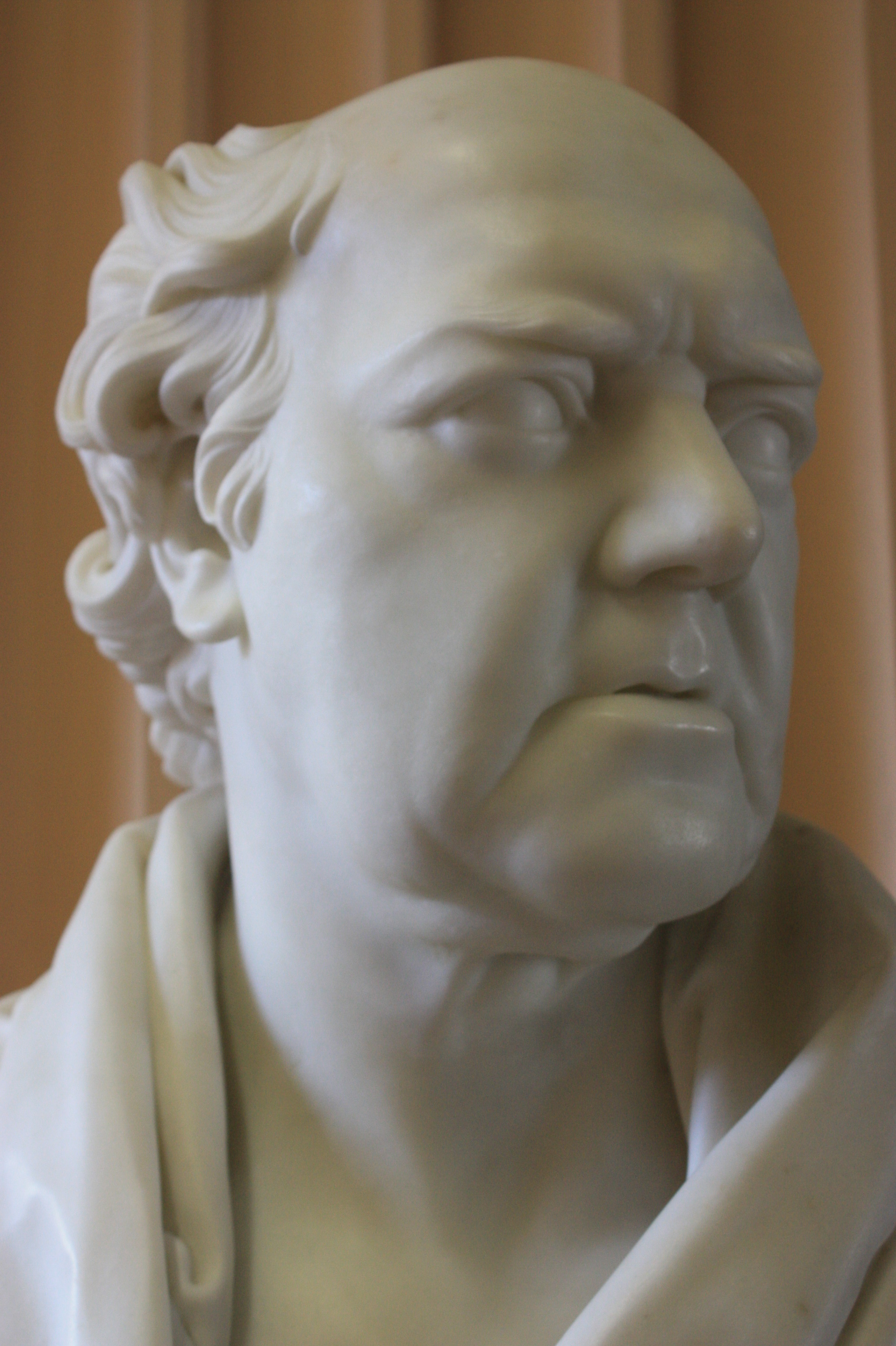
George Husband Baird (1792–1799)

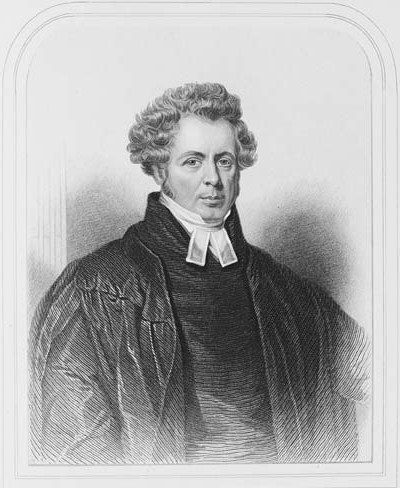
Andrew Mitchell Thomson (1810–1814)

From	Until	Incumbent	Notes
1723	1732	John Hepburn	Translated from Torryburn; admitted, 3 October 1723; translated to Old Greyfriars, 28 June 1732.
1732	1733	John Glen	Translated from Stichill; admitted, 14 December 1732; translated to the New North Kirk, (Note: The New North Kirk (also known as "Haddo's Hole Kirk" and the "Little Kirk") met in the north-west portion of St Giles' from 1699 until it vacated St Giles' in 1880, by which time it was known as "West St Giles'". At the Disruption of 1843, the minister and a significant number of the congregation formed New North Free Church, which joined the United Free Church in 1900 and the Church of Scotland in 1929, becoming the "New North Kirk". This congregation united with Greyfriars in 1941.) 22 November 1733.
1733	1738	Robert Wallace	Translated from Moffat; admitted, 22 November 1733; translated to the New North Kirk, 30 August 1738.
1739	1744	William Wishart	Minister of Scottish Church, Founders' Hall, London; appointed, 7 February 1739; translated to the Tron Kirk, 25 July 1744.
1745	1747	James Stevenson	Translated from the second charge of South Leith; admitted, 20 June 1745; translated to Old Greyfriars, 24 December 1747.
1747	1751	Frederick Carmichael	Translated from Inveresk and admitted, 24 December 1747; died in office, 17 October 1751.
1752	1754	George Kay	Translated from St Cuthbert's; admitted, 26 October 1752; translated to Old Greyfriars, 11 October 1754.
1754	1758	Robert Dick	Translated from Lanark; admitted, 11 October 1754; translated to the Old Kirk, 21 June 1758.
1758	1767	John Erskine	Translated from Culross; admitted, 15 June 1758; translated to Old Greyfriars, 9 July 1767.
1767	1768	James Brown	Translated from Melrose; admitted, 9 July 1767; translated to the New North Kirk, 24 November 1768.
1768	1776	Robert Henry	Minister of the High Meeting, Berwick-upon-Tweed; admitted, 24 November 1768; elected moderator of the General Assembly, 1774; translated to the Old Kirk, 19 December 1776.
1776	1779	John Kemp	Translated from Trinity Gask, Perthshire; admitted, 19 December 1776; translated to the Tolbooth Kirk, (Note: The Tolbooth Kirk occupied the south-west portion of St Giles' until its relocation to a new church in 1843.) 25 November 1779.
1779	1786	Andrew Hunter	Translated from the New Church, Dumfries; elected Professor of Divinity at the University of Edinburgh; admitted, 25 November 1779; translated to the Tron Kirk, 2 April 1786.
1787	1789	William Martin	Translated from Gargunnock and admitted, 22 February 1787; died in office, 10 February 1789.
1789	1791	Henry Grieve	Translated from Dalkeith; admitted, 22 July 1789; translated to the Old Kirk, 27 April 1791.
1791	1793	John Scotland	Translated from Linlithgow; admitted, 13 October 1791; died in office, 3 May 1792.
1792	1799	George Husband Baird	Translated from Dunkeld; admitted, 15 November 1792; translated to the New North Kirk, 10 January 1799.
1799	1800	Andrew Brown	Translated from Lochmaben; admitted, 18 October 1799; translated to the Old Kirk, 24 July 1800.
1800	1802	John Thomson	Translated from Markinch; admitted, 18 October 1800; translated to the New North Kirk, 16 December 1802.
1803	1809	Alexander Brunton	Translated from Bolton; admitted, 16 May 1810; translated to the Tron Kirk, 23 November 1809.
1810	1814	Andrew Mitchell Thomson	Translated from the East Kirk, Perth; admitted, 16 May 1810; translated to St George's, Edinburgh, 16 June 1814.
1814	1822	John Thomson	Translated from the New North Kirk and readmitted, 20 October 1814; died in office, 17 February 1822.
1822	1829	William Muir	St George's, Glasgow; admitted, 12 September 1822; translated to St Stephen's, Edinburgh, 26 February 1829.
1829	1838	Daniel Wilkie	Translated from Yester; admitted, 13 August 1829; died in office, 29 November 1838.
1839	1843	James Julius Wood	Translated from the first charge of Stirling and admitted, 1839; joined the Free Church while on leave for ill health, 1843.
1843	1882	William Robertson	Translated from Logie, Bridge of Allan, and admitted, 21 December 1843; died in office, 21 February 1882.
1882	1889	Henry Conway	Translated from Rubislaw, Aberdeen, and admitted, 1882; appointed Professor of Church History at the University of Aberdeen and resigned, 30 October 1889.
1890	1905	Robert Stewart	Translated from Jedburgh and admitted, 8 May 1890; died in office, 1 May 1905.
1905	1919	James Nicoll Ogilvie	Senior chaplain in Madras Presidency; admitted 26 September 1905; elected moderator of the General Assembly, 1918; demitted, 1919.
1919	1929	William Wallace Dunlop Gardiner	Translated from St Madoes; admitted, 1919; became first minister of the united charge, 1929.
In 1929, the charges of Old and New Greyfriars were united.

== Greyfriars ==
After the death of Samuel Dunlop in 1928, no new minister was appointed to Old Greyfriars and the charges of Old and New Greyfriars were united as Greyfriars with William Wallace Dunlop Gardiner, the last minister of New Greyfriars, becoming the first minister of the united congregation. The partition between Old and New Greyfriars was demolished and the church was restored as one sanctuary between 1932 and 1938 under the architect Henry F. Kerr.

Lady Yester's Kirk united with Greyfriars in 1938 and, after Gardiner's departure in 1940, Greyfriars and the New North Church united in 1941; Duncan William Park Strang, the last minister of the New North Church, became minister of Greyfriars.

When Highland, Tolbooth, St John's united with Greyfriars in 1979, Ewen Angus MacLean, the last minister of Highland, Tolbooth, St John's, became minister of the united charge, which adopted the name Greyfriars, Tolbooth, and Highland Kirk. After Greyfriars, Highland, Tolbooth united with Kirk o' Field Parish Church in 2013, the name reverted to "Greyfriars".

From	Until	Incumbent	Notes
1929	1940	William Wallace Dunlop Gardiner	Previously minister of New Greyfriars; admitted, 1929; translated to Caddonfoot, 1940.
1941	1948	Duncan William Park Strang	Previously minister of the New North Church; admitted, 1941; translated to translated to Strone and Ardentinny, 1948.
1949	1978	Robert Stuart Louden	Translated from Dailly and admitted, 14 July 1949; demitted, 1978.
1979	1982	Ewen Angus MacLean	Previously minister of Highland, Tolbooth, St John's; admitted, 1979; demitted, 1982.
1983	2002	David Mackay Beckett	Translated from Clark Memorial, Largs, and admitted, 9 February 1983; demitted, 2002.
2003	2023	Richard Frazer	Translated from St Machar's Cathedral, Old Aberdeen; admitted, 2003.
2024	incumbent	Susan Campbell MacGregor	Previously probationary minister at Greyfriars Kirk; admitted, 2024.
