= William Dunlop =

William Dunlop may refer to:

- William Dunlop (ecclesiastical historian) (1692–1720), British professor of church history at the University of Edinburgh
- William Dunlop (motorcycle racer) (1985–2018), British motorcycle racer
- William Dunlop (principal) (c.1654–1700), Covenanter and principal of Glasgow University
- William James Dunlop (1881–1960), Ontario MPP and cabinet minister
- William "Tiger" Dunlop (1792–1848), Member of Parliament for United Province of Canada and Warden of the Forests, Canada Company
- William Patterson Dunlop (1951–2009), Canadian actor
- William Vincent "Billy" Dunlop, convicted murderer who was the first person to be convicted under the new UK double jeopardy laws

== See also ==
- Billy Dunlop (footballer, born 1874) (1874–1941), Scottish international footballer who played for Liverpool
- Billy Dunlop (Sunderland footballer) (1869–1960), Scottish football half-back who played for Sunderland and Rangers in the 1890s
- Billy Dunlop (footballer, born 1926) (1926–1994), Scottish football inside forward who played for various clubs in the 1950s
- Rex Dunlop (William Rex Dunlop, born 1927), Scottish footballer
