= Margaret Hepburn =

- Born: c.1726 probably in Edinburgh
- Died: 1758 or later
- Occupation: merchant
- Known for: catering for funerals

Margaret Hepburn (c.1726 – 1758 or later) was an Edinburgh shopkeeper of goods relating to funerals.

== Life ==
Its not known where Hepburn was born, but she was baptised in Edinburgh on the 4 September 1726 at St Giles, Edinburgh which is now Edinburgh Cathedral. She was the second daughter born to Margaret (born Fenton) and John Hepburn. Her father was the minister of Greyfriars Kirk in Edinburgh from 1723 when the family moved from Torryburn in Fife.

Hepburn went into business with Lilias Christie and they were trading by 1749., together they sold or hired goods associated with funerals. They were known as grocers. Later these would have been supplied by an undertaker but at the time no one was employed in that role. Lilias Christie is thought to have been one of Hepburns relatives as her maternal grandparents were Thomas and Emelia Fenton and Emelia's father was James Lister, Cmamberlain to the Earl of Moray. All of James Lister's daughters were involved in confectionary and in particular funereary biscuits.

They would contact a "master household" who would see to all the arrangements on the ay of a funeral but Hepburn and Lister's business would supply appropriates draperies for the church and the household and they would arrange the supply of catering. Margaret's cousin sold wine for funerals and her aunt and uncle supplied provisions. They would hire glasses and sundry items like sugar tongs for the funeral together with plum cake and biscuit.

The business survived due to word of mouth although having a father who was a minister must have been helpful in finding clients. Her father was moved to New Grayfriars in 1732 and died still in service in 1749.

By 1758 her business partner had died but she was still trading. No records have been found after this date.
