= Matthew Murray (minister) =

The Rev Matthew Murray FRSE (1735-1791) was an 18th-century Scottish minister and Fellow of the Royal Society of Edinburgh.

== Life ==
He was born in North Berwick in 1735 the son of Rev George Murray and his wife Anna Reid.

He was licensed to preach in 1756. He originally preached in Haddington but in 1758 he replaced his father in his home town of North Berwick, remaining there for the rest of his life.

In 1784 he was elected a Fellow of the Royal Society of Edinburgh. His proposers were William Robertson, Alexander Carlyle, and Henry Grieve.

He died in North Berwick on 13 August 1791.

== Family ==
In 1772 he married Anne Hill (d.1803) sister of Rev George Hill.

Their children included Rev George Murray and Hugh Murray.
