= Alexander Dunlop (scholar) =

British classics professor (1684–1747)

- Born: 1684
- Died: 1747 (aged 62–63)
- Father: William Dunlop

Alexander Dunlop (1684–1747) was a British scholar of Ancient Greek.

== Family ==
Alexander Dunlop was the eldest son of William Dunlop, principal of Glasgow University, born in Carolina in 1684. His brother, William Dunlop, was also a scholar.

His daughter Elizabeth Dunlop married Rev Patrick Boyle of Shewalton (who inherited Shewalton from his uncle Patrick Boyle, Lord Shewalton) who was son of John Boyle, 3rd Earl of Glasgow. Their children included David Boyle, Lord Boyle.

== Career ==
Dunlop was appointed Professor of Greek in the University of Glasgow about 1706. He published in 1736 a Greek grammar, which for many years was in general use in Scottish schools. In consequence of failing sight, he resigned his chair in 1742 on the terms that his salary and house should be secured to him during life. His successor, Dr. James Moor, was appointed on 9 July 1742. Dunlop died on 27 April 1747.
