= Hugh Murray (geographer) =

Scottish geographer and author

Hugh Murray FRSE FRGS (1779–1846) was a Scottish geographer and writer. He is often referred to as Hew Murray.

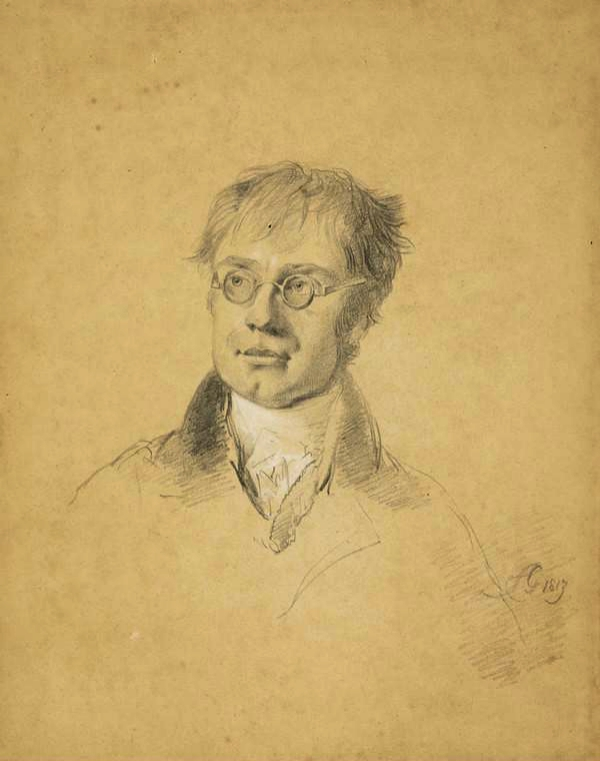
Hugh Murray (geographer), 1810

== Life ==
He was the younger son of Rev Matthew Murray FRSE (1735–1791), minister of North Berwick, and his wife, Anne Hill (d.1803) daughter of Ref John Hill, of St. Andrews, and sister of Henry David Hill, professor at St. Andrews, and of Rev George Hill.

Murray entered the Edinburgh excise office as a clerk.

On 22 January 1816 he was elected a Fellow of the Royal Society of Edinburgh. His proposers were Rev Thomas Brown, John Leslie and John Playfair. At this time he was living at 24 Stockbridge, Edinburgh. He was also a Fellow of the Royal Geographical Society of London.

Murray was editor of the Scots Magazine from 1816 to 1817. His connection with Archibald Constable's Edinburgh Gazetteer caused him to figure in the Tory squib, written by James Hogg and others, called Translation from an Ancient Chaldee MS., which appeared in Blackwood's Magazine for October 1817. He also featured as the character Murphy in John Paterson's Mare, Hogg's allegorical satire on the Edinburgh publishing scene first published in the Newcastle Magazine in 1825.

Murray died after a short illness, while on a visit to London, in Wardrobe Place, Doctors' Commons, on 4 March 1846.

== Family ==
His grandfather Rev George Murray (d. 1757), was minister of North Berwick, as was his elder brother, George (1772–1822), from 1795 till his death.

== Works ==
Murray published The Swiss Emigrants, a tale (anon.), in 1804; two philosophical treatises (The Morality of Fiction, 1805, and Enquiries respecting the Character of Nations, 1808); and another romance, Corasmin, or the Minister, in 1814.

=== Encyclopædia of Geography ===
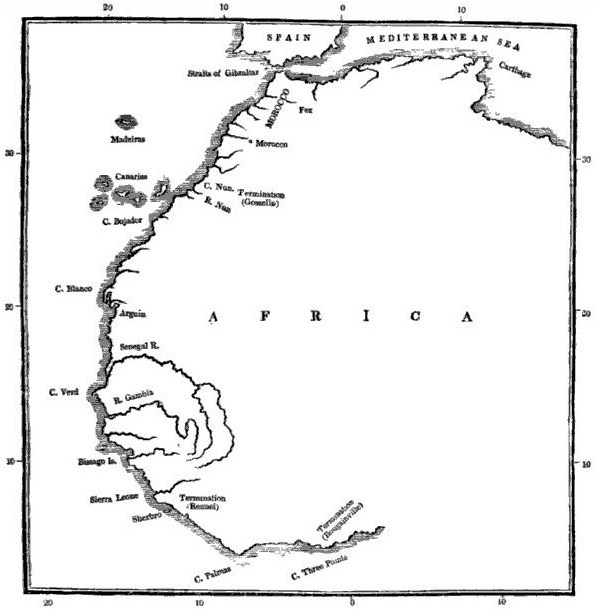
Voyage of Hanno the Navigator, from the Encyclopedia of Geography

Murray's major work was the Encyclopædia of Geography, a Description of the Earth, physical, statistical, civil, and political (London, 1834). He wrote the geographical part; the other sections were astronomy (William Wallace), botany (William Jackson Hooker), geology (Robert Jameson) and zoology (William Swainson). A supplement was published in 1843. The work contained 82 maps and over a thousand woodcuts. It was well received, and an American edition (1843) in three volumes was edited by Thomas Gamaliel Bradford.

=== Books ===
Murray's other main publications included:

- A Catechism of Geography, 4th ed. enlarged, Edinb. 1833, 7th ed. 1842.
- Travels of Marco Polo, amended and enlarged, with notes, 1844, 1845.

After his death were published:

- The African Continent: a Narrative of Discovery and Invention … with an Account of recent exploring expeditions by J. M. Wilson, 1853.
- Pictorial History of the United States of America to the close of Pres. Taylor's Admin. … with Additions and Corrections by H. C. Watson, illustrated, Boston, Massachusetts, 1861.

=== Other works ===
To the Transactions of the Royal Society of Edinburgh Murray contributed, among other papers, one, in 1818, On the Ancient Geography of Central and Eastern Asia, with Illustrations derived from Recent Discoveries in the North of India. In 1817 he enlarged and completed John Leyden's Historical Account of Discoveries and Travels in Africa.’ Similar works by him on Asia (3 vols. Edinburgh, 1820) and North America (London, 1829) followed.

Murray also contributed to the press, and in the Edinburgh Cabinet Library there appeared compilations by him on the history or geography of: the Polar Seas (1830), British India (1832), China (1836), British America (1839), Africa (1830), and The United States (1844). Some of these volumes had contributions on natural history, by Robert Jameson, Thomas Stewart Traill, James Nicol, and others.

== Notes ==
Attribution

This article incorporates text from a publication now in the public domain: Norgate, Gerald le Grys (1894). "Murray, Hugh". In Lee, Sidney (ed.). Dictionary of National Biography. Vol. 39. London: Smith, Elder & Co.
