= Robert Henry (minister) =

Scottish minister and historian

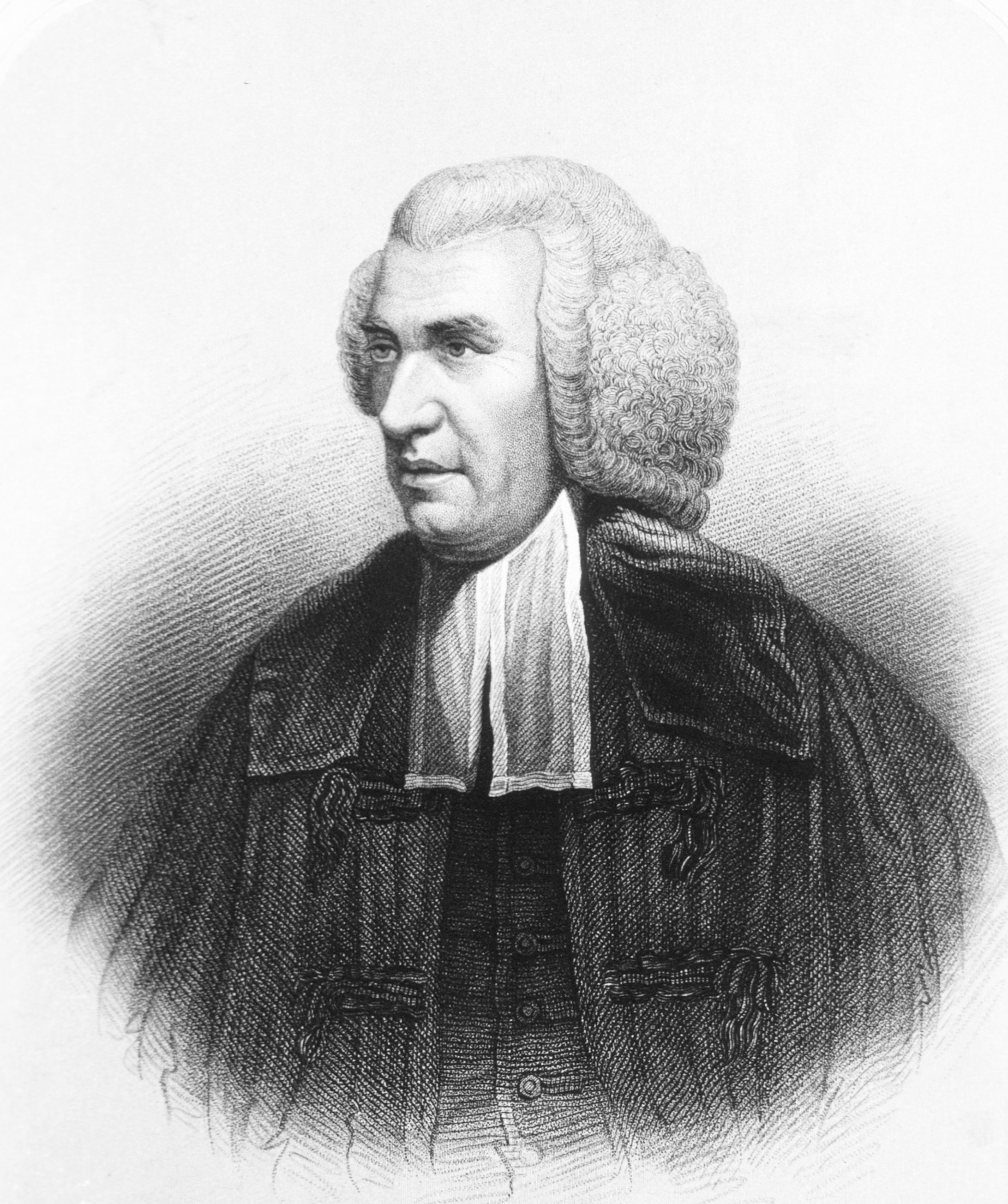
- Born: 18 February 1718
- Died: 24 November 1790 (aged 72)

Robert Henry FRSE FSA (Scot) (18 February 1718 – 24 November 1790) was a Scottish minister and historian.

== Life ==
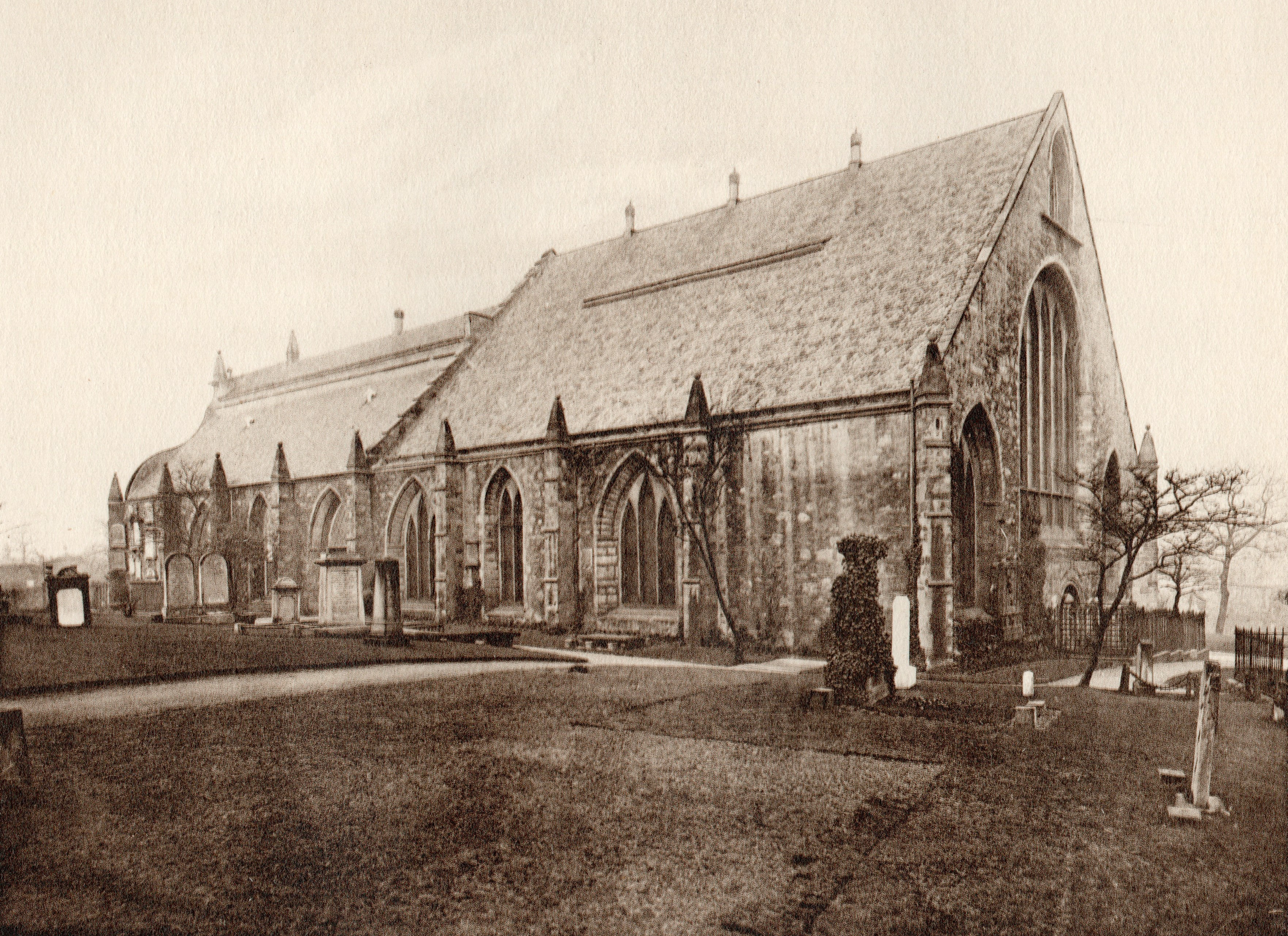
Old and New Greyfriars

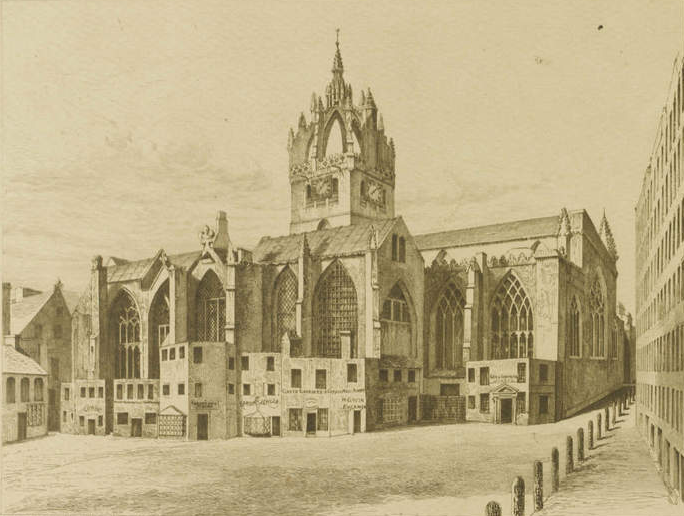
St Giles in the 18th century

He was born on 18 February 1718, the son of Jean Galloway and James Henry, a farmer at Muirton Farm near St. Ninians, Stirlingshire.

Henry was educated at St Ninian's Parish School then Stirling Grammar School. He then studied at the University of Edinburgh. After teaching at Annan Grammar School, he entered the Church of Scotland, being licensed by the Presbytery of Annan in 1746, but not finding a patron. He was finally ordained in 1748, just over the Scottish border in Carlisle, and translated in 1760 to Berwick-upon-Tweed, still just over the Scottish border (the rules on patronage were different in England).

In May 1768 he finally got a position in Scotland: as minister at New Greyfriars in Edinburgh. The University of Edinburgh granted him an honorary doctorate (DD) in July 1770. At this time he lived at Bristo Street, just south of Greyfriars Church.

He was Moderator of the General Assembly of the Church of Scotland in 1774.

In 1776 he moved from New Greyfriars to Old Kirk, St Giles and remained in this role until death.

In 1783 he was one of the co-founders of the Royal Society of Edinburgh.

He died on 24 November 1790 at his home in Merchant Street in Edinburgh (just south of St Giles) but is buried with his family in Polmont churchyard. His position at St Giles was filled by Henry Grieve. He bequeathed his library to the Town Council of Linlithgow but his link to this town is unclear.

== Family ==
In June 1763 he was married to Anne Balderston (d. 1800).

== Works ==
He wrote a History of Great Britain on a New Plan (1771), covering the period from the first Roman invasion until the reign of King Henry VIII. The novelty consisted in dividing the subjects into different heads, civil history, military, social, and so on, and following out each of them separately. The work was mainly a compilation, having no critical qualities. Despite the persistent and ferocious attacks of Dr Gilbert Stewart, it was successful, and brought the author over £3000. It attracted the support of the Earl of Mansfield, whose persuasion gained for Henry a government pension of £100. The work was posthumously concluded by Malcolm Laing.

- Goguet, Antoine-Yves (1761), The Origin of Laws, Arts, and Sciences and Their Progress among the Most Ancient Nations, a translation of De l'Origine des Loix, des Arts, et des Sciences, et de Leurs Progrès chez les Anciens Peuples.
- Revelation: The Most Effectual Means of Civilising and Reforming Mankind, 1773.
- The History of Great Britain from the First Invasion of It by the Romans under Julius Caeser Written on a New Plan (1st ed.), London: T. Cadell, Vol. I (1771), Vol. II (1774), Vol. III (1777), Vol. IV (1781), Vol. V (1785).
