= George Kay (minister) =

18th-century Scottish

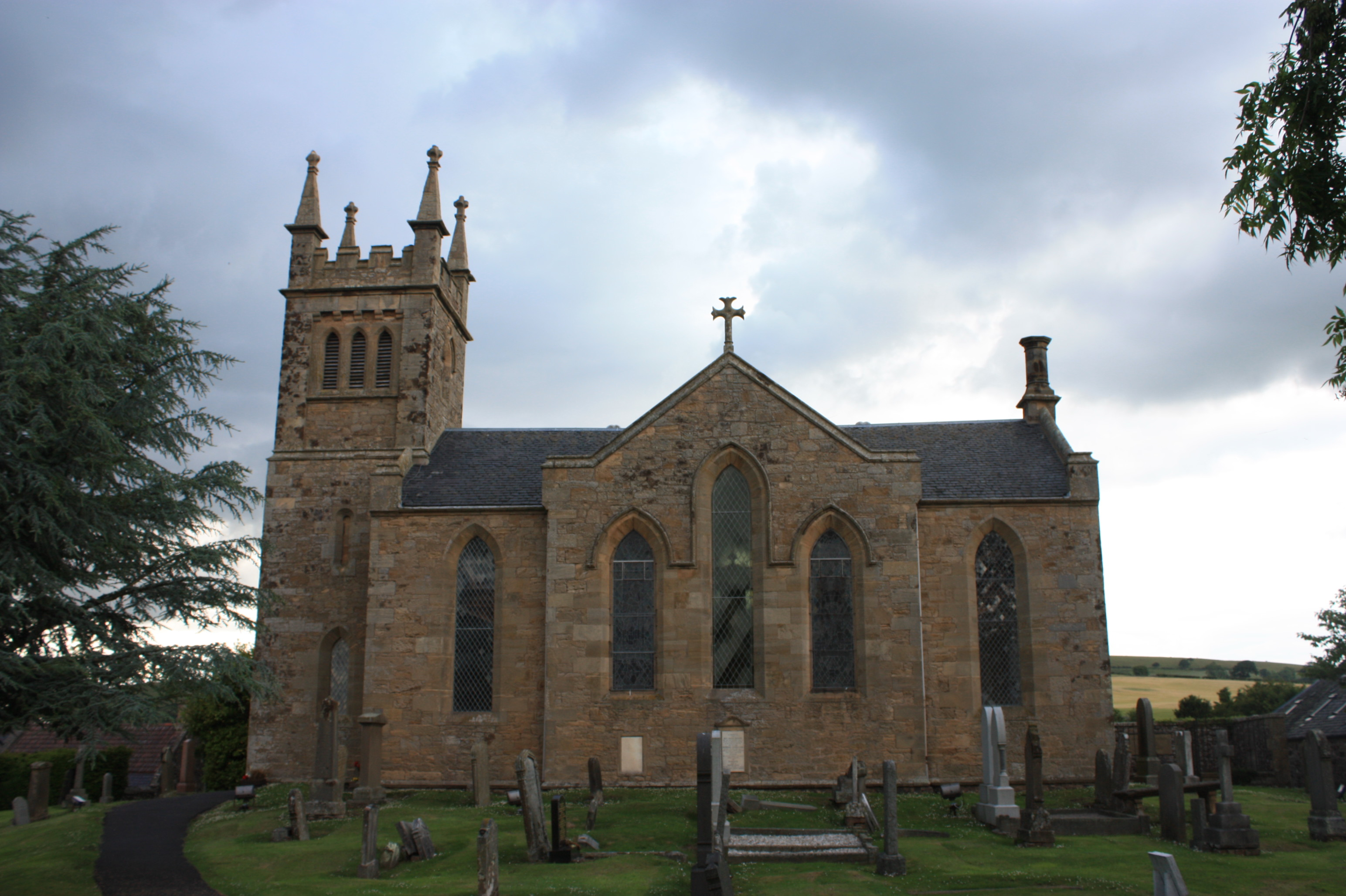
Collessie Parish Church

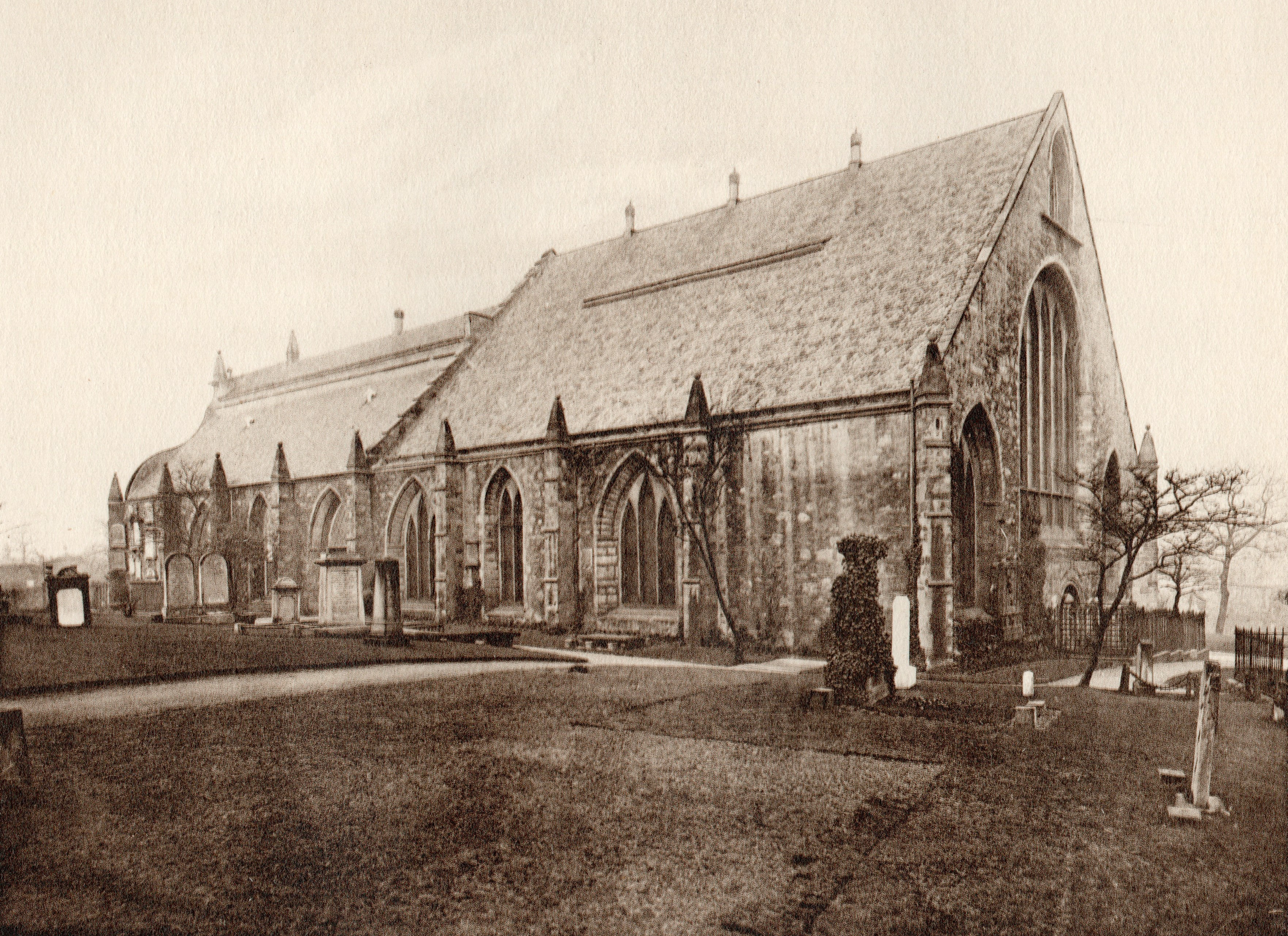
New and Old Greyfriars

George Kay (c.1710–1766) was an 18th-century Scottish minister of the Church of Scotland. He was Moderator of the General Assembly in 1760.

== Life ==
In 1729, he graduated with an MA from the University of St Andrews. He was licensed by the Presbytery of Kirkcaldy in 1734 and ordained as minister of Collessie Parish Church in 1739 and translated to Minto in 1741.

Making frequent steps he moved to Dysart in 1743 and St Cuthbert's Church, Edinburgh in 1747. From there he translated to New Greyfriars in 1752 and from there to "second charge" of Old Greyfriars in 1754, replacing Rev Robert Hamilton.

The University of Edinburgh awarded him an honorary Doctor of Divinity (DD) in 1759 and in May 1760 he was elected Moderator of the General Assembly. In 1760 he was also given the additional role of Army Chaplain serving Stirling Castle.

He died in Edinburgh on 10 April 1766 and is buried in Greyfriars Kirkyard. His role at Greyfriars was filled by Rev John Erskine.

== Family ==
In 1747, he married Charlotte Sherriff, and together they had two son: David (b.1749), Charles (1751-1762) and a daughter, Margaret (b.1757). After Charlotte's death, he married Ann Forth in 1761; she died in 1788.
