= William Dunlop (principal) =

- Born: c. 1654; Paisley, Scotland
- Died: 8 March 1700; Glasgow, Scotland
- Known for: Principal of the University of Glasgow (1690–1700) predecessor: James Fall successor: John Stirling; Historiographer Royal for Scotland (1693–1700) predecessor: Christopher Irving successor: Daniel Campbell; Founding leader of Stuart Town, a Scottish settlement in the Province of Carolina
- Spouse: Sarah Carstares
- Children: Alexander Dunlop; William Dunlop
- Website: William Dunlop, Biography at www.gla.ac.uk

William Dunlop (c. 1654 – 8 March 1700) was a Scottish minister, Covenanter and adventurer who was Principal of the University of Glasgow from 1690 to 1700. An advocate for the use of enslaved labour in America, he was the first Presbyterian minister in South Carolina.

== Biography ==
William Dunlop was the eldest son of Rev Alexander Dunlop (c. 1620 – c. 1667), a Church of Scotland minister at Paisley, Scotland, and his wife, Elizabeth Mure (c. 1620 – c. 1667), daughter of William Mure of Glanderston. At some time before 1684 William Dunlop became a licentiate minister of the Church of Scotland.

=== Tutor and Whig ===
William grew up during the time of persecution of the Covenanters. His mother and father were imprisoned "for their constancy in the cause of the Covenant." As a young man William gained a position as tutor to the family of William Cochrane, Baron of Paisley and Ochiltree who was a Covenanter. In 1679, during the Westland Rising, William served as a courier for the Whigs who were attempting to negotiate with the leader of the Royal army. This rebellion was put down at the Battle of Bothwell Bridge. William Dunlop, along with Henry Erskine (Lord Cardross) and his half-brother John Erskine, Sir Robert Montgomery of Crevock, and Sir George Campbell of Cesnock were implicated, but not prosecuted, as participants in the uprising.

=== Dunlop in Carolina ===
In the early 1680s Anthony Ashley Cooper, 1st Earl of Shaftesbury was Lords Proprietor of the Province of Carolina. He was also sympathetic to the Protestant Non-Conformists and was promoting ships to take settlers to the Carolinas as a place of religious tolerance. In 1682 Lord Cardross, Campbell, and Sir John Cochrane (son of the aforementioned William Cochrane) negotiated the purchase of two counties south of Charles Town, South Carolina.

In July 1684 the Carolina Merchant, captained by James Gibson, left the Firth of Clyde with 149 passengers, including: Cardross, Dunlop, Montgomery, 35 convicts (Covenanters who were being banished), settlers who were being transported as indentured servants, and some paying passengers. The ship arrived in Charles Town on 2 October 1684 with no lives lost. However, they arrive during an outbreak of malaria. Soon after arriving most of the immigrants became ill, including Cardross and Dunlop, and some died. In November, a smaller group of fifty-one sailed south to Port Royal and chose a site for Stuart Town. The towns location was about 1.5 miles south of present-day Beaufort at Spanish Point.

By March 1685, the town had been laid out and a number of homes were built. They formed a militia for protection and Dunlop served as a major and as the settlements Presbyterian minister. Dunlop advocated using the labour of enslaved African people from Barbados and he sold eleven runaway slaves to the Spanish for sixteen hundred pieces of eight.

Having purchased the land from the English, the Scots were supposed to follow established guidelines of legal jurisdiction. However, the Scots began questionable trading relationships with the Indigenous federation. Together with the Yamasee, the Scots attacked a Spanish mission at Santa Catalina and captured 22 Timucuans to be used as slaves. The Governor, Robert Quary, investigated and ordered the arrest of Cardross. Cardross was too ill to travel, so Dunlop wrote Quary and apologized for their actions and said they would submit to magistrates appointed by the governor.

On 17 August 1686 the Spanish attacked Stuart Town. It was either in retaliation for the attack on Santa Catalina or simply to contest the Scots presence on the coast. Three small ships with 100 soldiers surprised the settlers at Stuart Town. Most of the settlers, who were ill with fever, could put up no resistance and escaped into the forest. For three days the Spaniards plundered the town, killed livestock and burned the entire village to the ground. The Spaniards began to move towards Charles Town, burning English homes and plantations along the way when a hurricane hit. Two of the ships were destroyed, but the third returned to St. Augustine. Dunlop and some of the survivors retreated to Charles Town.

It is uncertain if William Dunlop returned to Scotland after the destruction of Stuart Town. However, it is recorded that in April 1687, William Dunlop was in the St. Helena Sound area, presumably to make another attempt to set up trade with the Native Americans. In 1690, an admirer, John Stewart, wrote from Carolina to Dunlop in Edinburgh, congratulating him for his work in establishing cotton plantations.

=== Principal of the University of Glasgow ===
Upon his return to Scotland in 1690, after the Glorious Revolution and the overthrow of James VII of Scotland, William was appointed minister of Ochiltree. In December he was appointed Principal of the University of Glasgow, possibly through the influence of his brother-in-law and cousin William Carstares, an advisor to King William II of Scotland. Dunlop's achievements as Principal included increasing grants and other income from the King and the Scottish Parliament. He held this post until his death in 1700.

At some point in the 1690s, William Dunlop had a role in exposing a plot against the authority of King William II of Scotland. On 31 Jan. 1693 Dunlop was appointed Historiographer Royal for Scotland. He committed the university to contribute to the heavy cost of rebuilding the Blackfriars Kirk, which had been destroyed by a lightning strike in 1670.

=== Company of Scotland ===
Dunlop invested about £1,000 in the Company of Scotland trading to Africa and the Indies and persuaded the university to invest a similar amount. In the autumn of 1697 the directors of the company asked him to travel to Edinburgh to provide expert advice on the establishment of an overseas trading colony. Along with Robert Blackwell, he was asked to investigate whether the banker William Paterson had had any involvement in the misappropriation of company funds by his business associate James Smyth.

William Dunlop died on 8 March 1700.

== Family ==
William Dunlop married Sarah Carstares (1650–1733), the daughter of Covenanter John Carstares and Janet Mure. Janet was a sister of Elizabeth Mure, Dunlop's mother, meaning the couple were first cousins. They shared a grandfather - William Mure of Glanderston. The couple lived in Glasgow before Dunlop's departure for Carolina in 1684, by which time they had three sons ('Jocke', 'Sandie' (Alexander), and William) and a reputation as devout Presbyterians.

William Dunlop (1692–1720) was Professor of Church History at Edinburgh University from 1715 to 1720. Alexander Dunlop (1684–1747) was Professor of Greek at Glasgow University.

Dunlop's brother-in-law William Carstares was an academic at the University of Edinburgh. He had studied at Dordrecht in the Netherlands, and Sarah Carstares spent some time in Rotterdam while Dunlop was away in Carolina. During this time, she looked after the three children and managed Dunlop's affairs, writing a series of detailed letters to her husband (who she often called her ‘dear[e]st Heart’). These are now held in the National Library of Scotland. Of the couple's children, Alexander Dunlop (1684–1747) became a professor of Greek at the University of Glasgow, and William 'the Younger' (1692–1720) became a professor of church history at the University of Edinburgh.
