= Mungo Law =

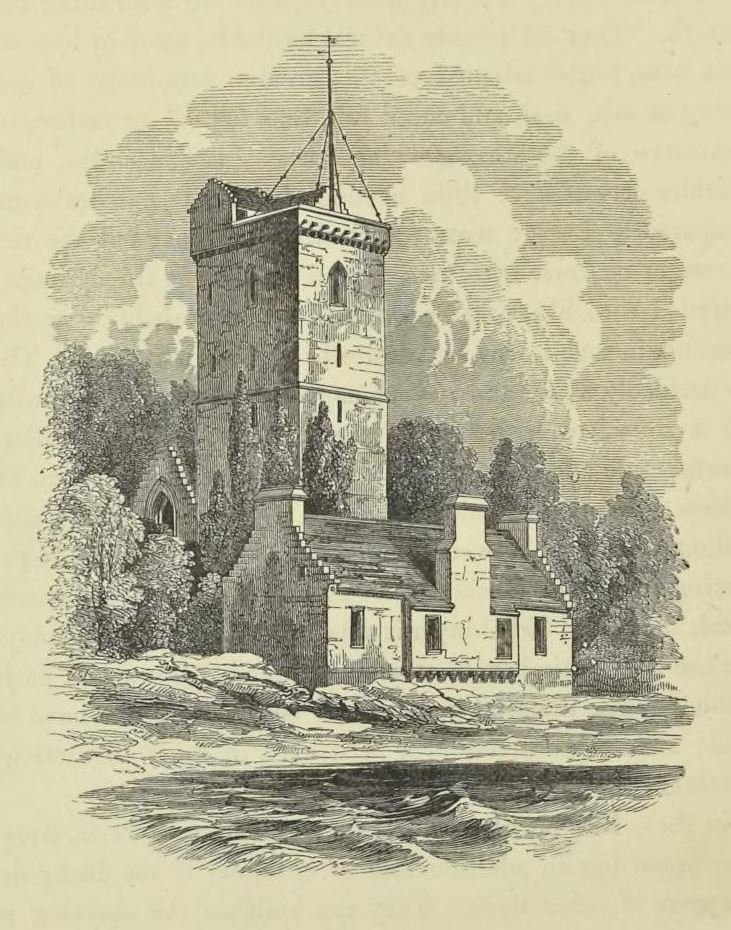
Dysart Church

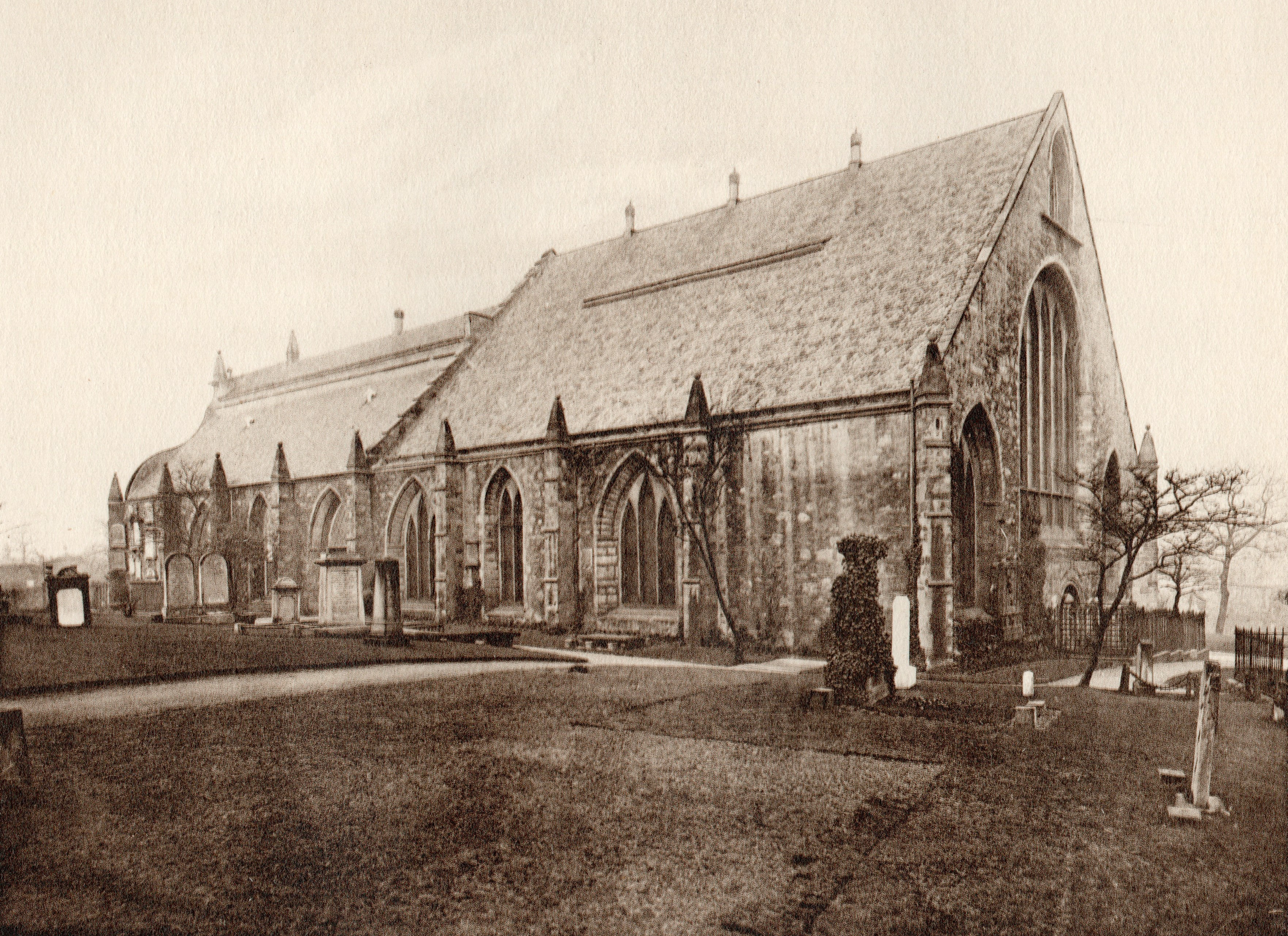
New and Old Greyfriars

Mungo Law (c.1606–1660) was a Scottish minister of the Church of Scotland. He was minister of the Greyfriars Kirk in Edinburgh. He was a noteworthy figure in Scotland during the English Civil War.

== Life ==
He graduated MA at Glasgow University in 1627 and became schoolmaster of Kirkcaldy Parish School in July 1628. In 1635 he became private tutor to the family of "George, Master of Ramsay" for a year.

In October 1636 he was elected "second charge" of the then quite important Dysart Parish Church, on the edge of Kirkcaldy. In December 1643 he was elected by the Town Council of Edinburgh as minister of Old Greyfriars again as "second charge" (in place of James Fairlie), first under George Gillespie then under Rev Robert Traill. He translated to the post from Dysart in March 1644.

In Edinburgh he formed part of the commission on the Assembly from 1644 to 1649. In March 1645 he was involved in the trial of Agnes Finnie, accused of witchcraft.

He took an active role in the English Civil War serving as an Army Chaplain and was present at the Battle of Inverlochy (1645).

He was present at the capture of Edinburgh Castle by the English army under Oliver Cromwell in December 1650. He escaped capture in Edinburgh but was captured in 1651 at the Onfall of Alyth and held prisoner in England.

He returned to Edinburgh and Greyfriars in January 1653 and died there in February 1660. He is buried in Greyfriars Kirkyard.

== Family ==
In May 1638 he married Lilias Turner daughter of Rev Patrick Turner, minister of Dalkeith. They had at least 8 children including:

- Rev Mungo Law minister of Perth
- John Law
- Katherine
- Lilias (d. 1666)
- Anna married Rev John Liddell of Scone
- James
- Andrew
- David
