= William Dunlop (ecclesiastical historian) =

William Dunlop, the younger
- Born: 1692
- Died: 1720 (aged 27–28)
- Father: William Dunlop

William Dunlop, the younger (1692–1720) was a British professor of church history, at the University of Edinburgh.

== Life ==
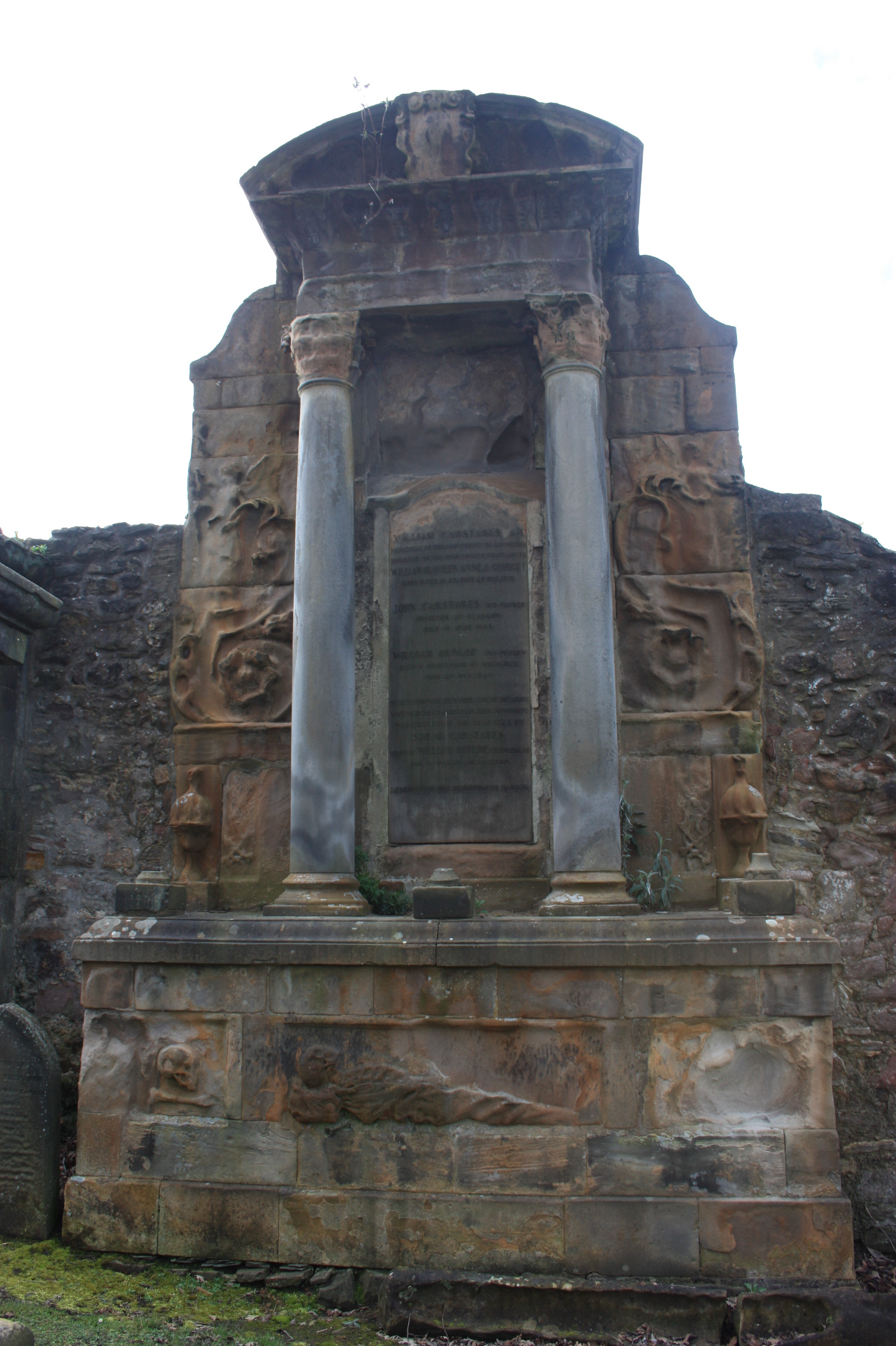
The Carstares grave, Greyfriars Kirkyard

He was born at Glasgow in 1692, the youngest son of William Dunlop, the elder, and Sarah Carstares. His brother, Alexander Dunlop, was also a scholar. The early death of his father threw on his mother the chief charge of his education.

After his philosophical course at Edinburgh he studied both law and divinity under the superintendence of Principal Carstares, who was married to his mother's sister. He was licensed in 1714 by the presbytery of Edinburgh, and soon after he was appointed by George I professor of divinity and church history in the university there. For the few years of his life thereafter, he continued to discharge the duties of his chair, and likewise to preach as occasion presented itself in the Edinburgh churches.

He was successful at the pulpit and had his life been prolonged he may have risen to the high distinction in the church.

He died in 1720, at the early age of twenty-eight. He is buried in the grave of his uncle, William Carstares in Greyfriars Kirkyard. The grave lies on an outer boundary wall, south-west of the church, backing onto the grounds of George Heriot's School.

== Publications ==
His publications were:

1. A Collection of Confessions of Faith, Catechisms, Directories, Books of Discipline and of Public Authority in the Church of Scotland, 2 vols. 1719–22.
2. A Preface to an edition of the Westminster Confession, &c., lately published at Edinburgh, 1720.
3. Sermons preached on Several Subjects and Occasions, 2 vols. octavo, 1722.
