= James Hart (minister) =

Scottish minister (1663–1729)

James Hart (1663–1729) was a Scottish minister of the Church of Scotland. He was a staunch objector to the Act of Union 1707. Richard Steele called him the "Hangman of the Gospel" for his fierce condemnation of sinners.

== Biography ==
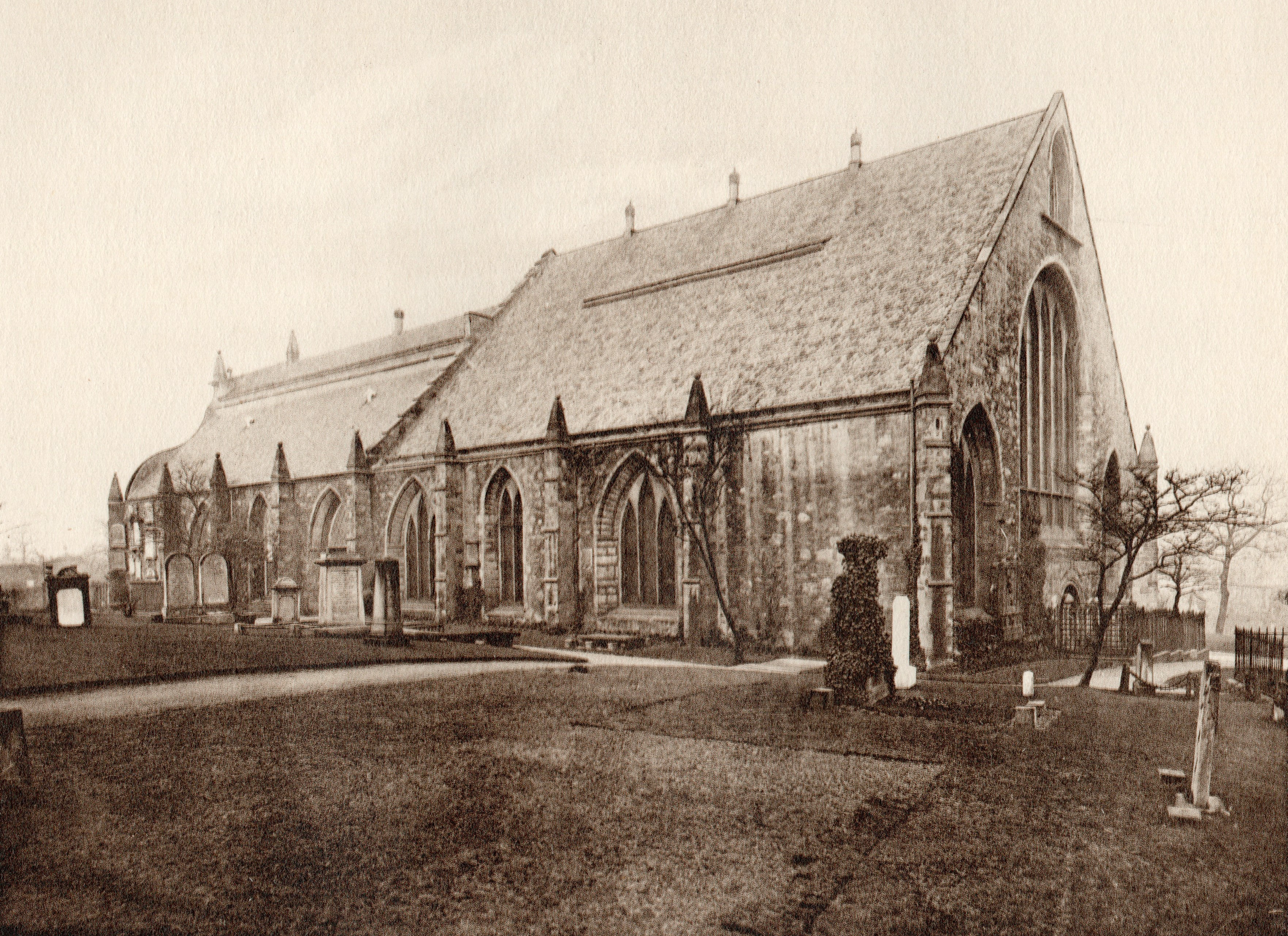
New and Old Greyfriars

Hart was born in 1663 the eldest son of James Hart, Provost of Jedburgh. He studied at the University of Edinburgh graduating with an MA in 1687.

Hart was ordained as minister of Ratho Parish Church in 1692. In September 1702, he was translated to the prestigious post as minister of Old Greyfriars in Edinburgh in place of Rev Gilbert Rule. In 1704 Rev William Carstares joined him as "second charge". Carstares was Principal of the University of Edinburgh at the time. Hart and Carstares fell out over the Act of Union, with Carstares favouring and Hart opposing the Union. Carstares left Greyfriars in 1707, the year of Union.

In 1714, Hart was one of the ministers chosen to go to London to congratulate King George I to his ascension to the throne. He was chosen as King's Almoner in Scotland in 1726.

He died in Edinburgh on 10 June 1729 and is buried in Greyfriars Kirkyard. His position at Greyfriars was filled by Rev William Brown (d. 1736).

== Family ==
In 1692, Hart married Margaret Livingston. They had no children.

In 1701, Hart married for a second time, to Mary Campbell of Kirkliston. The couple had 13 children, nine surviving into adulthood:

== Publications ==
- Sermons given by Rev James Hart at Ratho 1695 to 1697 (1698)
- The Journal of Mr James Hart (1714)
