= James Nicoll Ogilvie =

Scottish minister

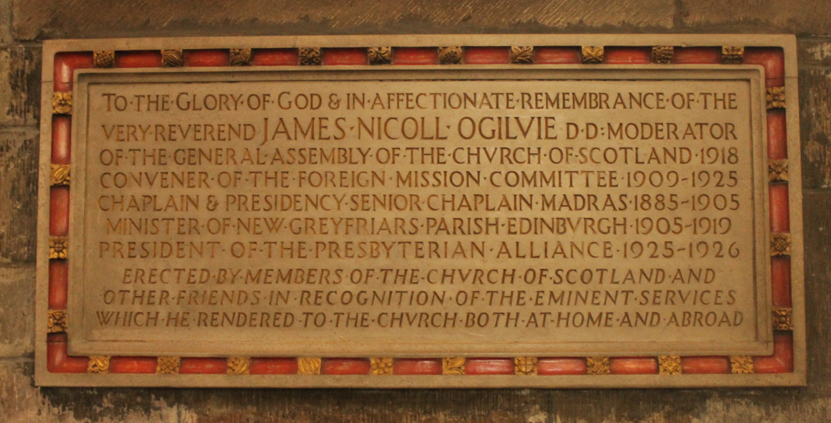
Plaque to James Nicoll Ogilvie, St Giles Cathedral

James Nicoll Ogilvie (1860–1926) was a Scottish minister. He was minister of Greyfriars Kirk in Edinburgh from 1905 to 1919 and Moderator of the General Assembly of the Church of Scotland in 1918.

== Life ==
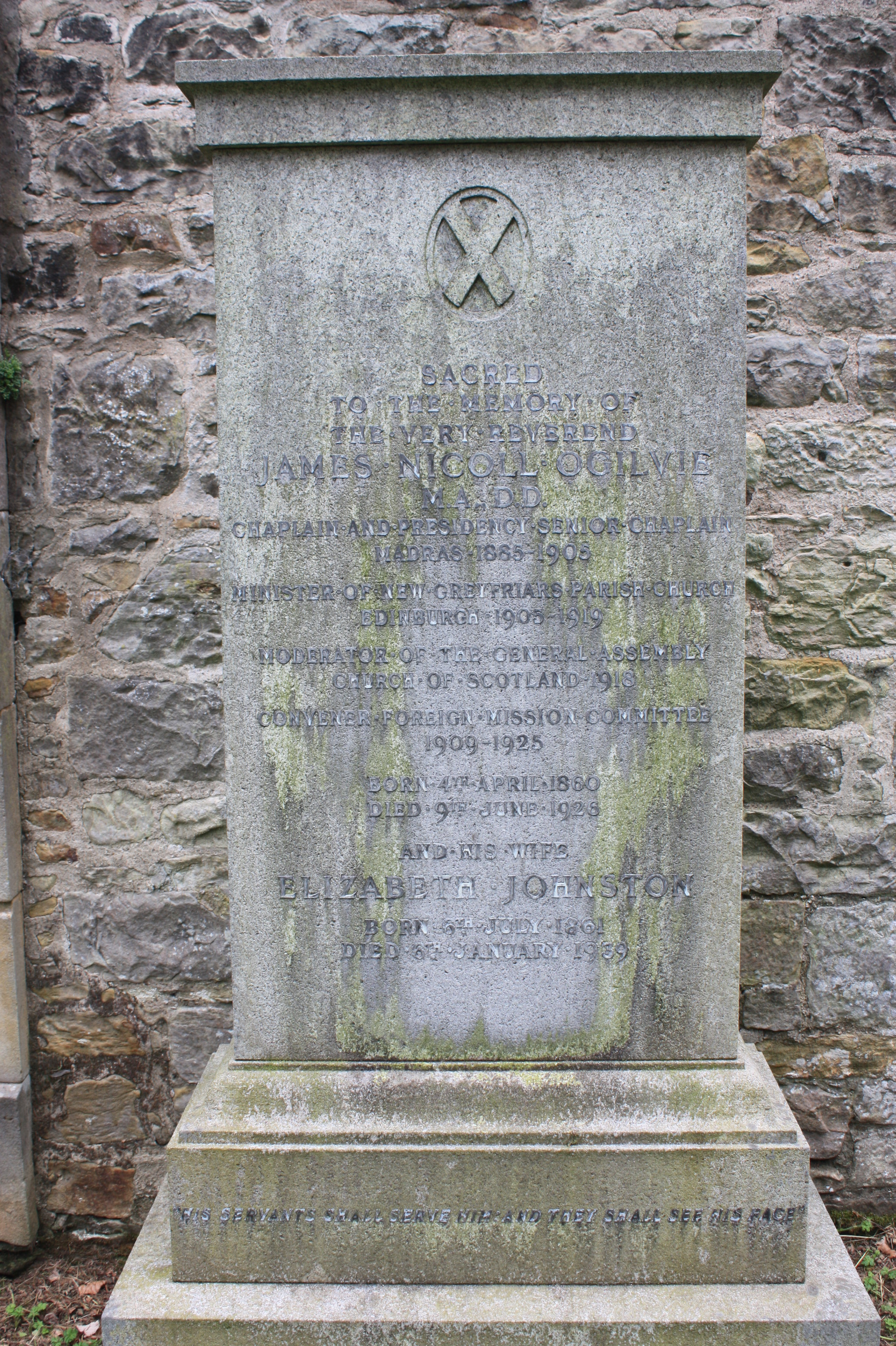
The grave of Very Rev James Nicoll Ogilvie, Dean Cemetery, Edinburgh

He was born on 4 April 1860, the son of Rev Ogilvie. He studied divinity at Aberdeen University, graduating MA in 1881.

From 1888 until 1905 he was senior chaplain to the Indian Army in Madras. He returned to Scotland in 1905 to take on the prestigious role of minister of New Greyfriars Kirk.

In later life he lived at 13 Dryden Place off Leith Walk in north Edinburgh. From 1909 to 1925 he was Convenor of the Foreign Missions Committee.

He died on 9 June 1926. He is buried in Dean Cemetery in western Edinburgh. The grave lies against the south wall of the first north extension, backing onto the original cemetery.

== Family ==
He was married to Elizabeth Johnston (1861–1939).

== Recognition ==
A plaque to Ogilvie was erected in St Giles Cathedral in central Edinburgh. It lies on the main north wall of the interior.

== Publications ==
- An Indian Pilgrimage
- Presbyterian Churches
- Our Empire’s Debt to Missions (1923)
