= Henry Grieve =

Scottish minister (1736–1810)

Henry Grieve FRSE (1736 – 10 February 1810) was a Scottish minister who served as Moderator of the General Assembly of the Church of Scotland in 1783. He was a co-founder of the Royal Society of Edinburgh in the same year. He was also one of the Deans in the Chapel Royal in Edinburgh and Chaplain in Ordinary to King George IV.

== Life ==
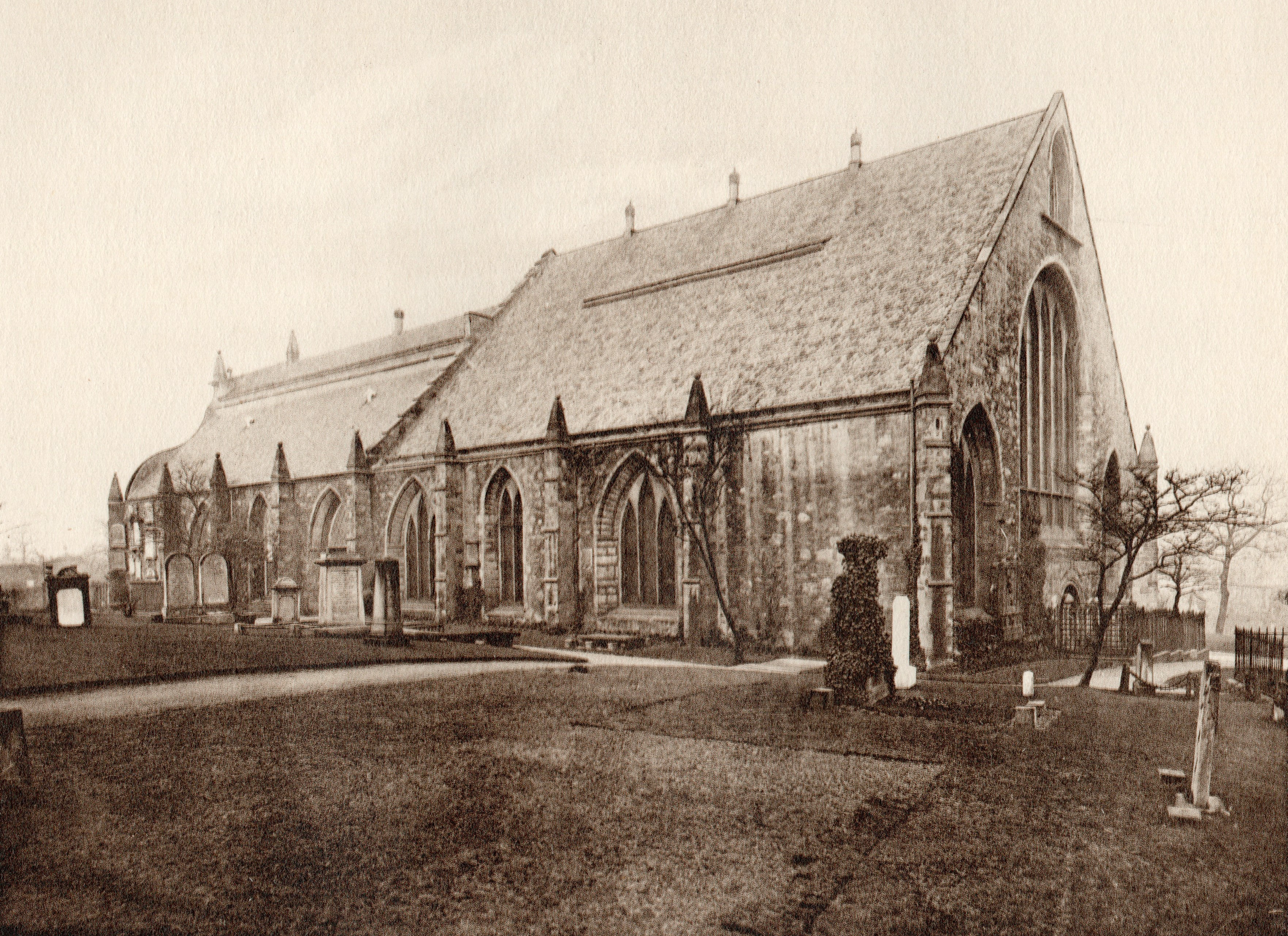
Old and New Greyfriars

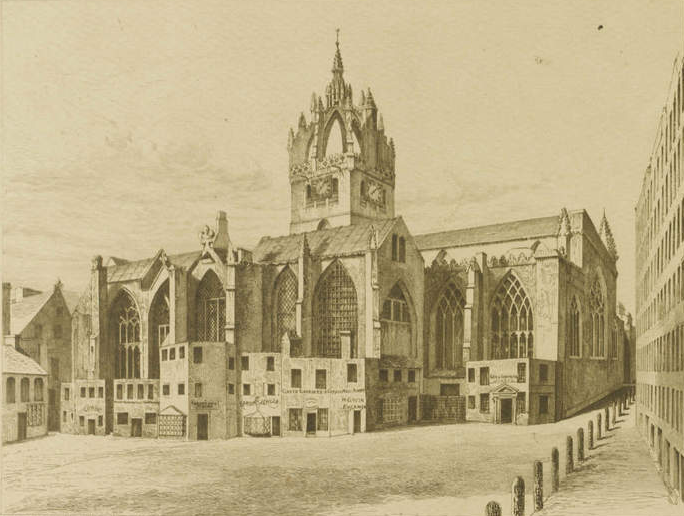
St Giles in the 18th century

He was licensed to preach by the Presbytery of Dunbar in 1759 but did not find a post until 1762 when he was ordained at Twynholm in south-west Scotland but stayed only six months before being translated to Eaglesham before settling in Dalkeith in 1765 as parish minister (living in Dalkeith manse). He received an honorary doctorate (DD) from the University of St Andrews in 1775.

In 1773 he approached the University of Edinburgh hoping to fill the vacant post of Adam Ferguson who was rumoured to be joining the East India Company, but Ferguson failed in this attempt therefore the approach came to nothing. He also tried for professorships at both the University of St Andrews and the University of Glasgoweach in competition with Prof James Beattie of Marischal College in Aberdeen.

In 1783 he was elected Moderator of the General Assembly and was made Chaplain in Ordinary to the King in 1784.

In 1788 Grieve was the subject of a caricature by John Kay portraying him (together with Rev Dr Carlyle of Inveresk as a jackass ridden by Rev Henry Moncrieff-Wellwood. This followed a debate on patronage of the church and the use of stipends.

In 1789 he moved from the church at Dalkeith to New Greyfriars Kirk in Edinburgh, in replacement of the Rev William Martin. At this time he is listed as living at Buccleuch Place in Edinburgh’s South Side.

In 1791 he translated from New Greyfriars to Old Kirk, St Giles slightly north of Greyfriars.

He died at Canaan House on Grange Loan on 10 February 1810. The house still exists as a building within the grounds of Astley Ainslie Hospital. He is buried in Dalkeith.

== Family ==
In June 1762 he married Janet Home (d. 1810). Their children included Rev Henry Home Grieve, minister of Crichton, and four other children who died in childhood.

== Publications ==
- Observations on the Overture Concerning Patronage (1769)
