= John Inglis (moderator) =

Scottish minister

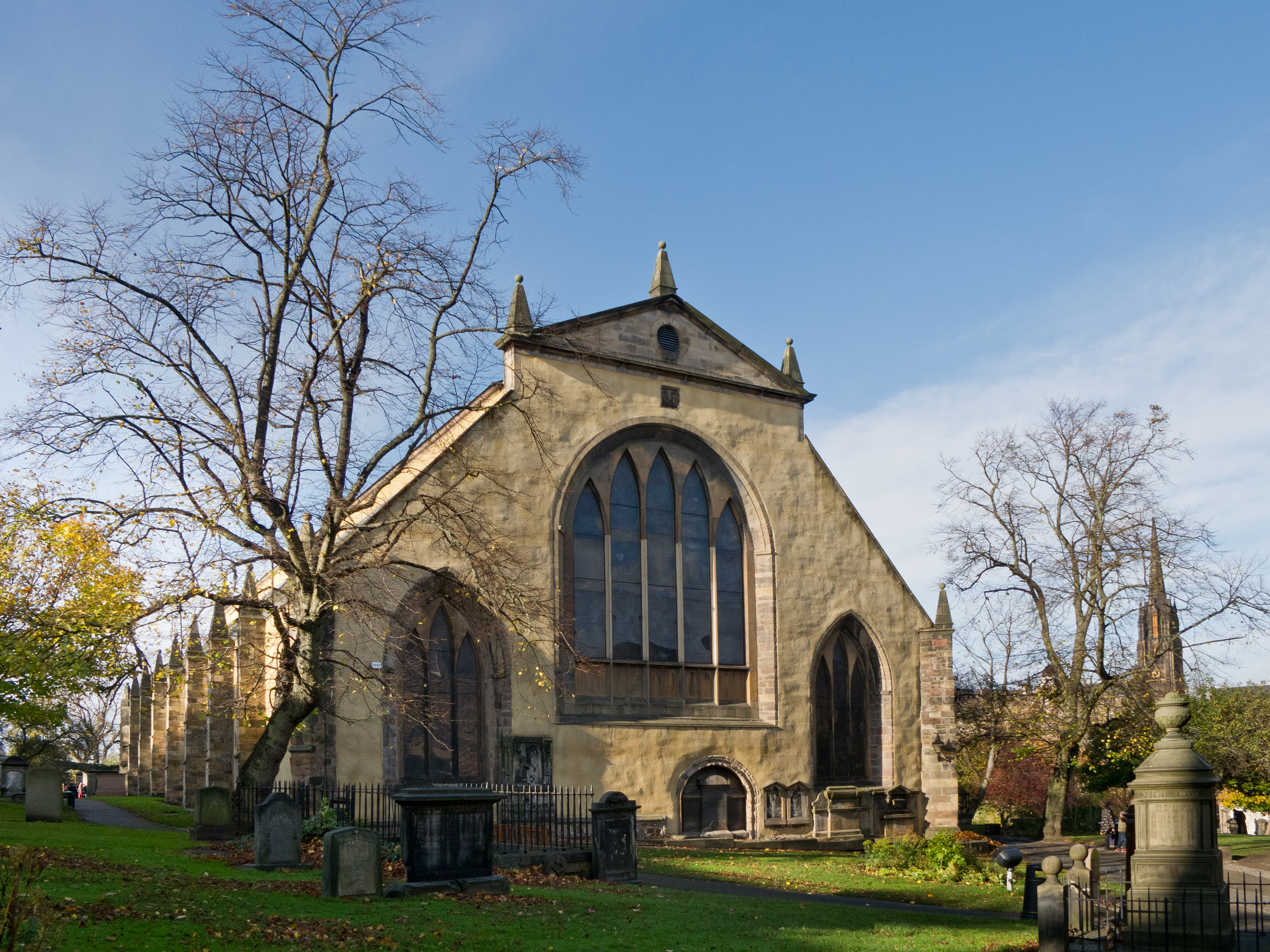
Greyfriars Kirk

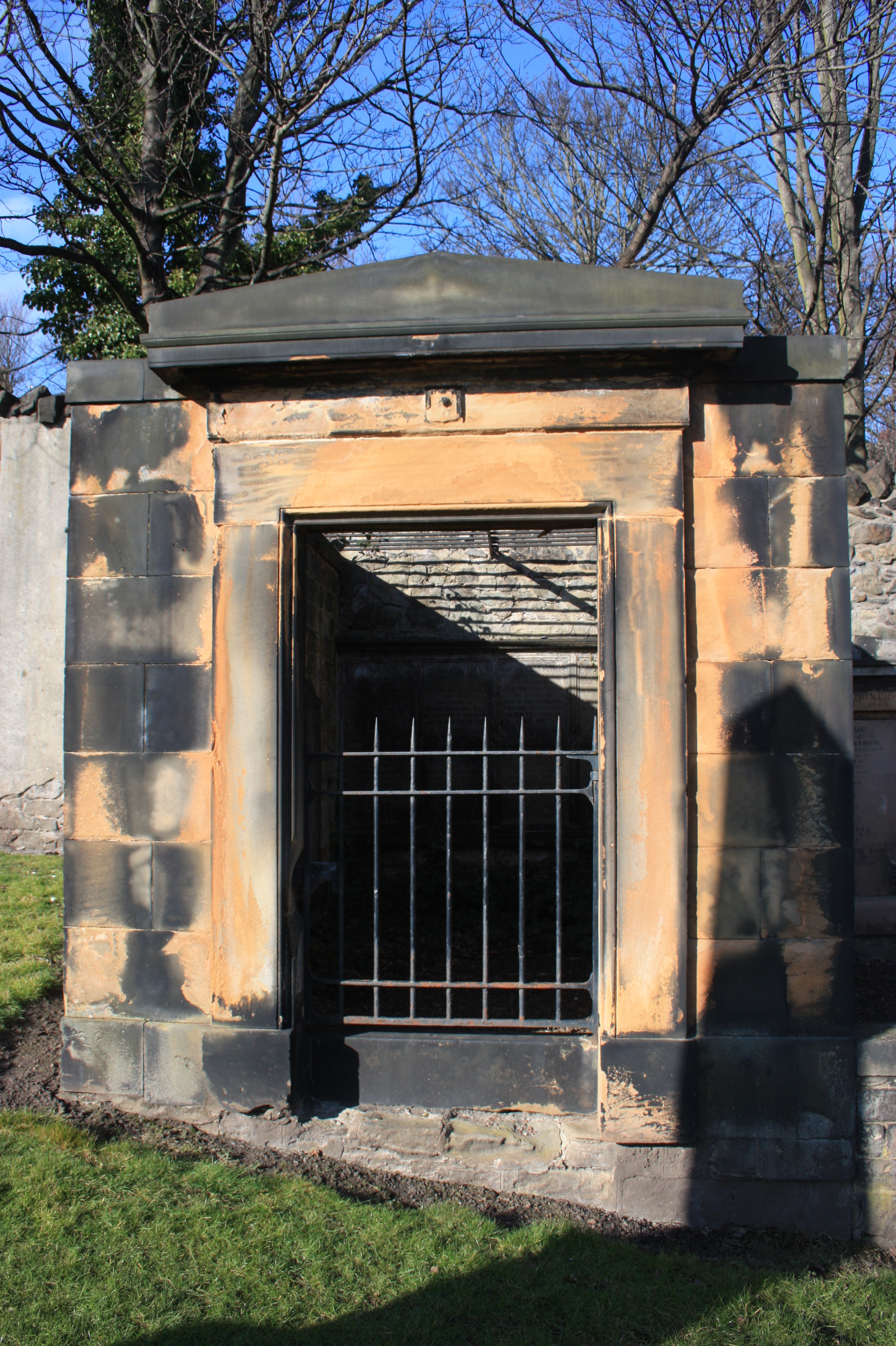
The grave of Very Rev John Inglis, New Calton Burial Ground, Edinburgh

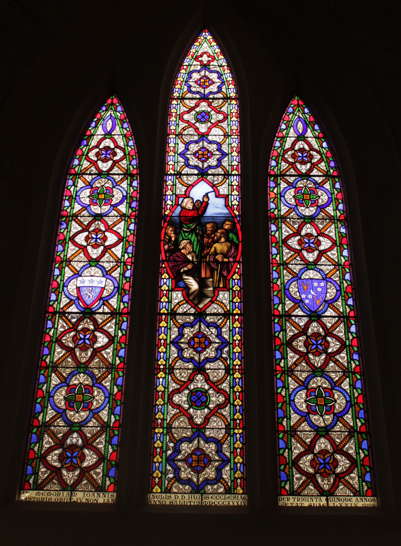
John Inglis memorial window, Greyfriars Kirk

John Inglis (1762–1834) was a Scottish minister of the Church of Scotland. He served as minister of Greyfriars Kirk and was Moderator of the General Assembly of the Church of Scotland in 1804.

== Life ==
He was born in 1762 in the manse at Forteviot the youngest son of Mary Bryce and her husband, Rev Harry Inglis, the local minister.

He studied Theology at the University of Edinburgh and was licensed to preach in September 1785 by the Presbytery of Perth. He found a patron and was ordained in Tibbermore church in July 1786. In October 1799 he was translated to Old Greyfraiars in Edinburgh. In 1804 the University granted him an honorary doctorate (DD) and later that same year he was elected Moderator of the General Assembly. He was then living at 5 Nicolson Street, a short distance from the church.

In 1810 he was made Dean of the Chapel Royal serving George IV. By 1820 he had moved to 43 George Square.

In 1824 he instigated the Committee on Foreign Missions within the Church of Scotland.

He died at 43 George Square on 2 January 1834. He is buried in New Calton Burial Ground in a vault half way along the northern boundary wall.

His role as Dean of the Chapel Royal was filled by Rev Dr Stevenson McGill who later also served as Moderator.

== Family ==
In 1798 he was married to Maria Moxham Passmore (1777-1864). Their children were:

- Harry Inglis of Loganbank WS (1800-1883)
- Abraham Passmore Inglis (b. 1803) served in the British Army
- William Bryce Inglis (1806-1808)
- John Inglis, Lord Glencorse (1810-1891)
- Mary Jane Inglis (b. 1804) married Dr John MacKenzie of Eilanreach

== Publications ==
- The Importance of Ecclesiastical Establishments (1821)
- A Vindication of Christian Faith (1830)
- A Vindication of ecclesiastical Establishments (1833)
- Evidences of Christianity
- Treatise in Defence of Ecclesiastical Establishments

== Recognition ==
A memorial window to Inglis was erected in Greyfriars Kirk in the late 19th century.
