= Robert Lee (minister) =

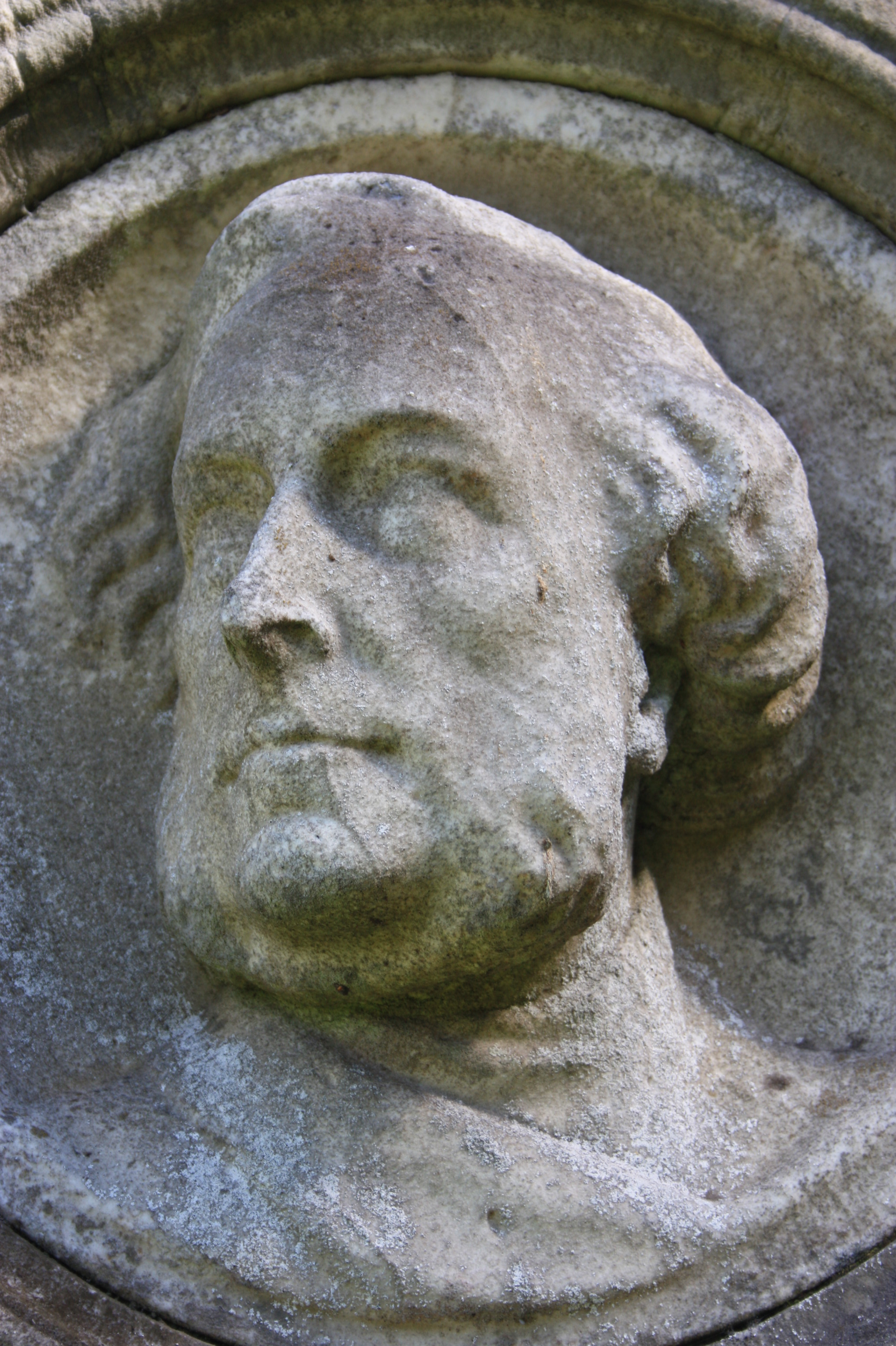
Rev Robert Lee

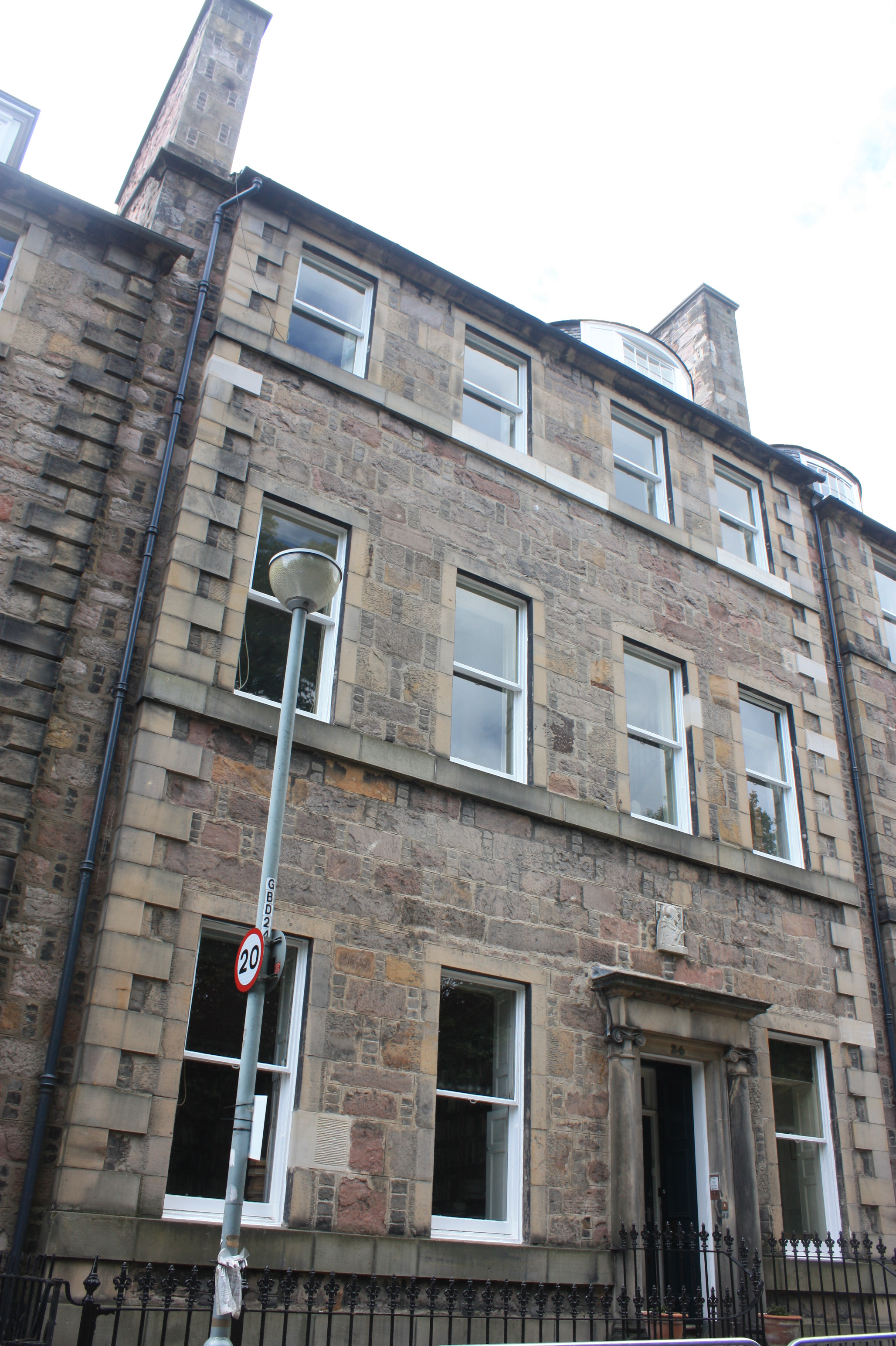
Lee's house at 24 George Square, Edinburgh

Robert Lee FRSE (1804-1868) was the first Professor of Biblical Criticism at the University of Edinburgh. He was both minister of Old Greyfriars Kirk and a Dean of the Chapel Royal serving Queen Victoria.

== Life ==
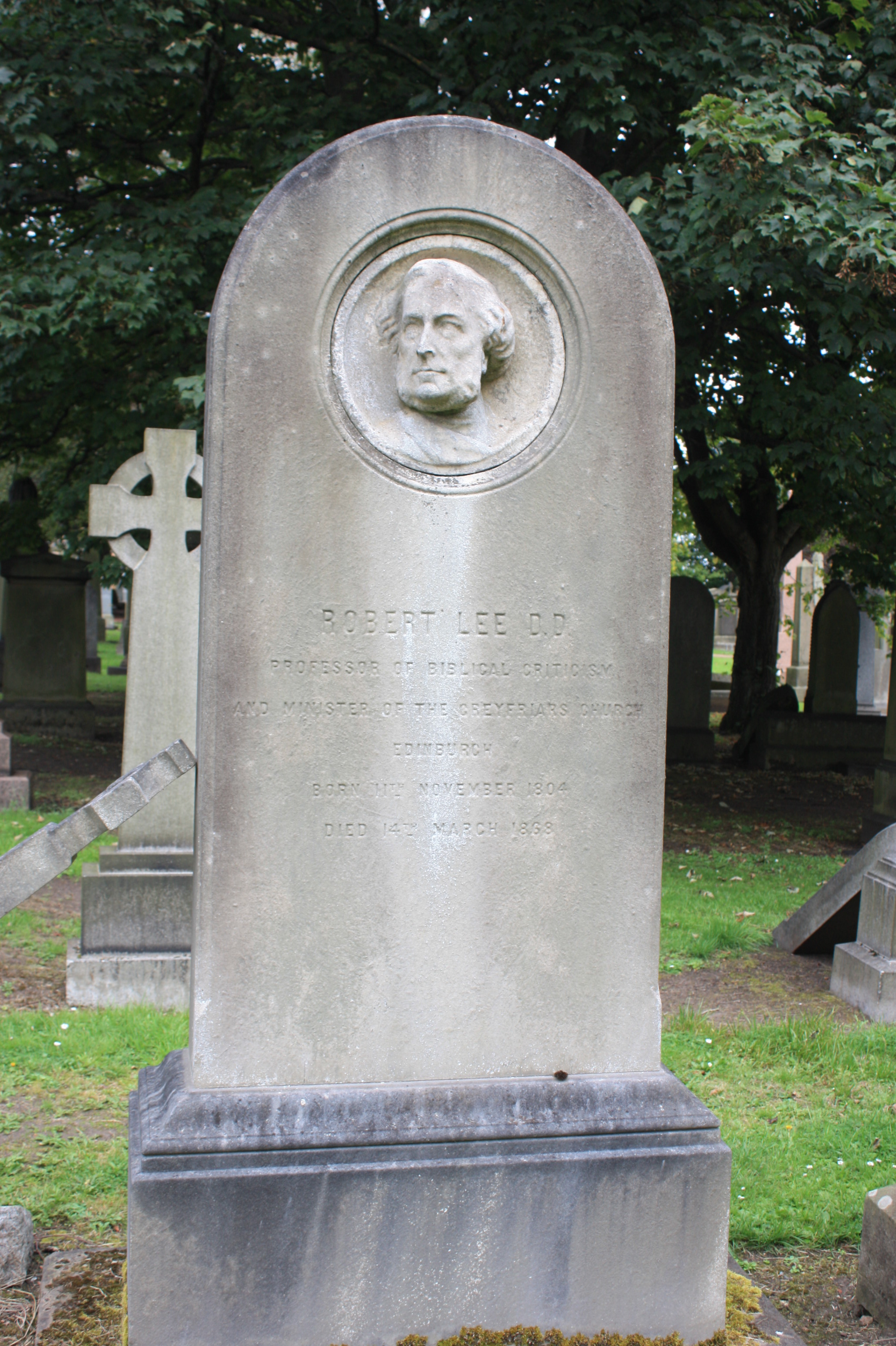
The grave of Rev Prof Robert Lee, Grange Cemetery, Edinburgh

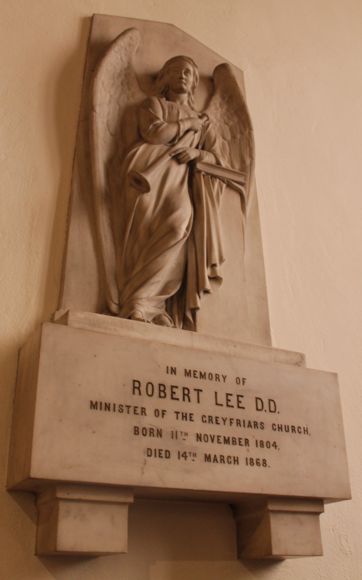
Memorial to Rev Robert Lee, Greyfriars Kirk

He was born in Tweedmouth on 21 November 1804, the eldest of three sons to Jane Lambert and George Lee, a boat-builder from a long line of boat-builders on the River Tweed. He was educated at Berwick Grammar School. He was then apprenticed into the family business, working as a boat-builder for six years. However, in 1824, his family seeing his potential, paid for him to study classics at the University of St Andrews in Scotland. He supplemented his income by tutoring the young George Whyte-Melville.

He was licensed by the Presbytery of St Andrews in 1832 and ordained as a minister of the Church of Scotland in 1833, his first charge being Inverbrothock Chapel of Ease, near Arbroath. In 1836 he was translated to Campsie, Stirlingshire.

In 1843 he was chosen to be minister of Old Greyfriars Kirk in Edinburgh, a prestigious charge. Unlike many of his peers, he did not leave the established church in the Disruption of 1843 and remained with the established church. The University of St Andrews awarded him with a doctorate (DD) in 1844. He was appointed a Chaplain in Ordinary to Her Majesty in 1846. In 1847 he became the first Professor of Biblical Criticism at the University of Edinburgh. He lived at 24 George Square in Edinburgh, not far from his church.

In 1853 he was elected a Fellow of the Royal Society of Edinburgh his proposer being John Russell.

From 1857 he began a major reform of the Presbyterian Church Service: he restored the reading of prayers, and introduced the practice of kneeling to pray and standing to sing. Singing in the Protestant Church had long been plain-song. He began the reintroduction of music: adding a harmonium to Greyfriars in 1863 and its first organ in 1865.

He was gravely ill for the last 9 months of his life following a fall from his horse on Princes Street after an evening out with fellow ministers on 22 May 1867, the eve of the General Assembly of the Church of Scotland 1867. In late autumn 1867 he gave up his ministry and went to live with a friend Rev Alfred Edersheim in Torquay in southwestern England, hoping the climate would improve his health. He died there on 14 March 1868.

His body was returned to Edinburgh for burial and he is buried in the south-east section of Grange Cemetery in southern Edinburgh. The pale sandstone monument, bearing his head in high relief, was sculpted by John Hutchison.

His wife was given a civil list pension of £100 per annum.

== Family ==
In June 1836 he married Isabella Carrack Buchanan (d.1889), who was from Campsie parish where he was minister. They had four daughters and one son;

- Margaret (1837-1862) married Lockhart Thomson SSC.
- George (1839-1862)
- Bella (1840-1863)
- Jane Ann (1843-1858)
- Catherine Napier (b.1845)

== Publications ==
- The Theses of Erasmus Touching Excommunication (1844)
- A Handbook of Devotion (1845)
- The Holy Bible with Marginal References Improved (1854)
- Prayers for Public Worship (1858)
- Prayers for Family Worship (1861 revised 1884)
- The Family and its Duties (1863)
- The Reform of the Church in Worship, Government and Doctrine (1864)
- The Clerical Profession (1866)
- Reform in Worship (1868)
- The Order of Public Worship and Administration of the Sacraments (1873)

== Artistic recognition ==
His portrait, by James R. Edgar, is held by the National Gallery of Scotland.

A pair of memorials exist to Lee within Greyfriars Kirk.
