= The Hub, Edinburgh =

Assembly hall in Edinburgh, Scotland

The Hub
- Victoria Hall; Highland Tolbooth St John’s Church
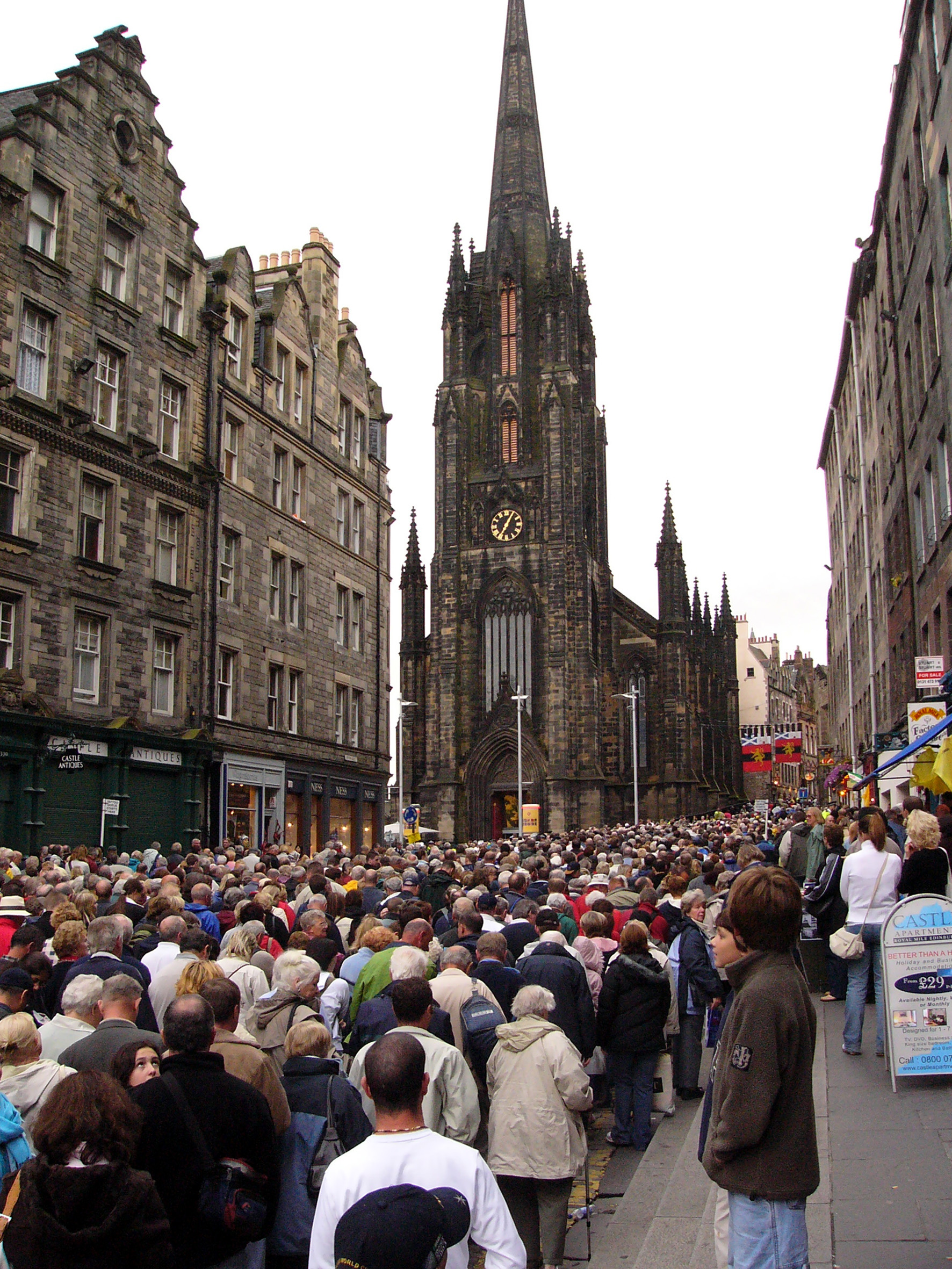
- The Hub seen from the Lawnmarket during the Edinburgh Festival.
- Interactive map of The Hub
- Location: Edinburgh, Scotland, UK
- Coordinates: 55°56′56.32″N 3°11′40.73″W
- Operator: Edinburgh International Festival
- Capacity: 400

Construction
- Opened: 1845
- Reopened: 1999
- Architects: James Gillespie Graham and Augustus Welby Pugin

Website
- www.thehub-edinburgh.com

The Hub is a public arts and events building in the centre of Edinburgh, Scotland. Located at the top of the Royal Mile, it is a prominent landmark as its tall Gothic spire (71.7 meters) is the highest point in central Edinburgh, and towers over the surrounding buildings below Edinburgh Castle. It was the Highland Tolbooth St John's Church.

The building is a notable example of Gothic Revival architecture and was designed by architects J Gillespie Graham and Augustus Pugin. Constructed between 1842 and 1845, it was originally designed as a meeting hall for the General Assembly of the Church of Scotland. From 1929 the building was used as a church until the mid-1980s. Today it is the home of the Edinburgh International Festival and is used as a ticket office, information centre and performance venue. The General Assembly of the Church of Scotland continues to meet here each May.

== History ==
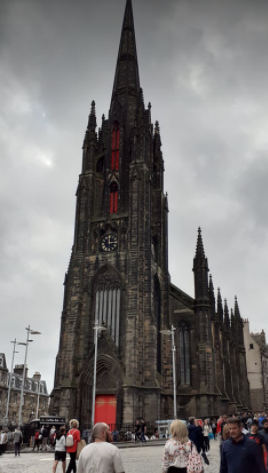
Former Tolbooth Church, Castlehill, Edinburgh

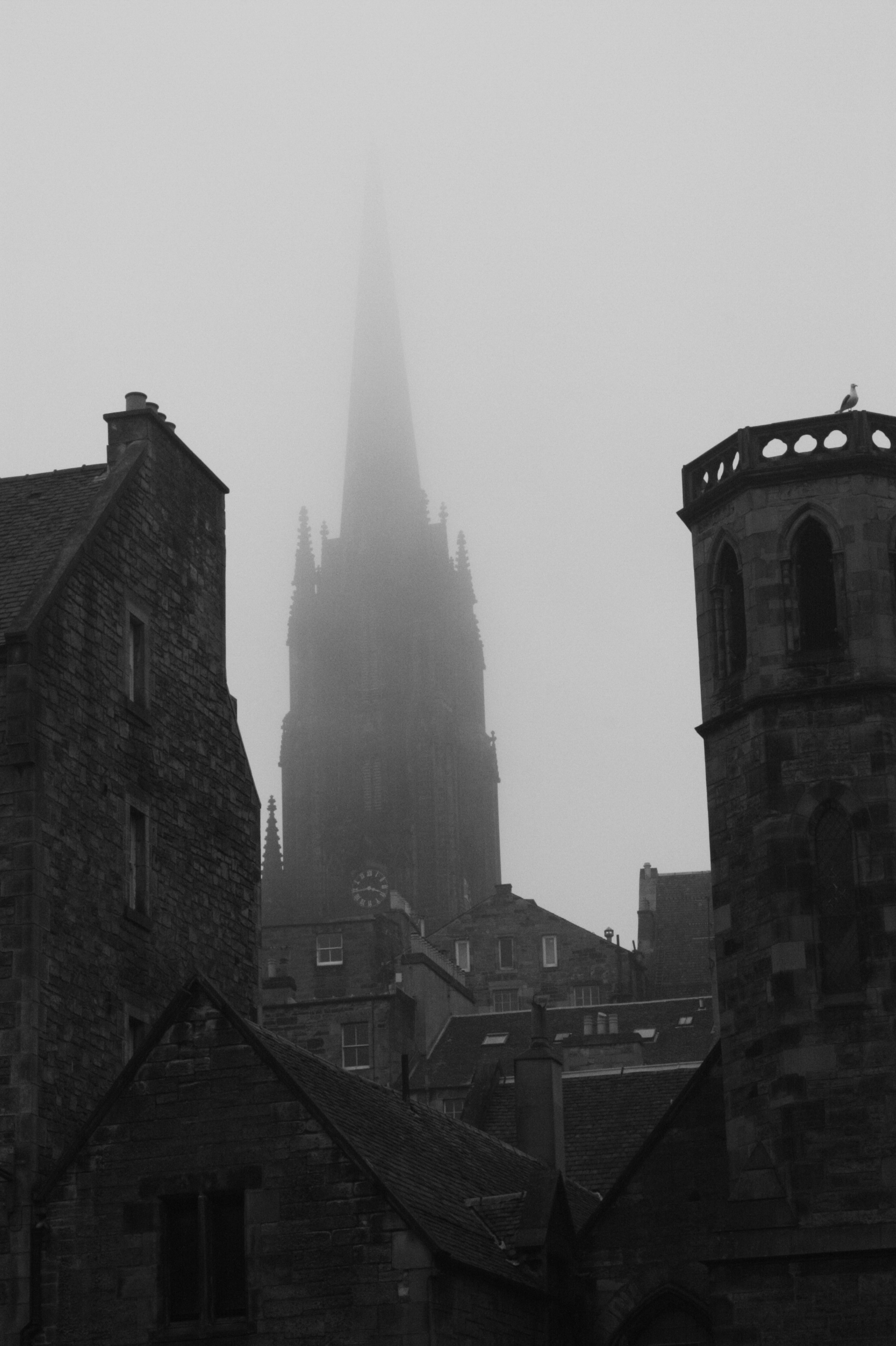
Highland Tolbooth Edinburgh seen from Greyfriars

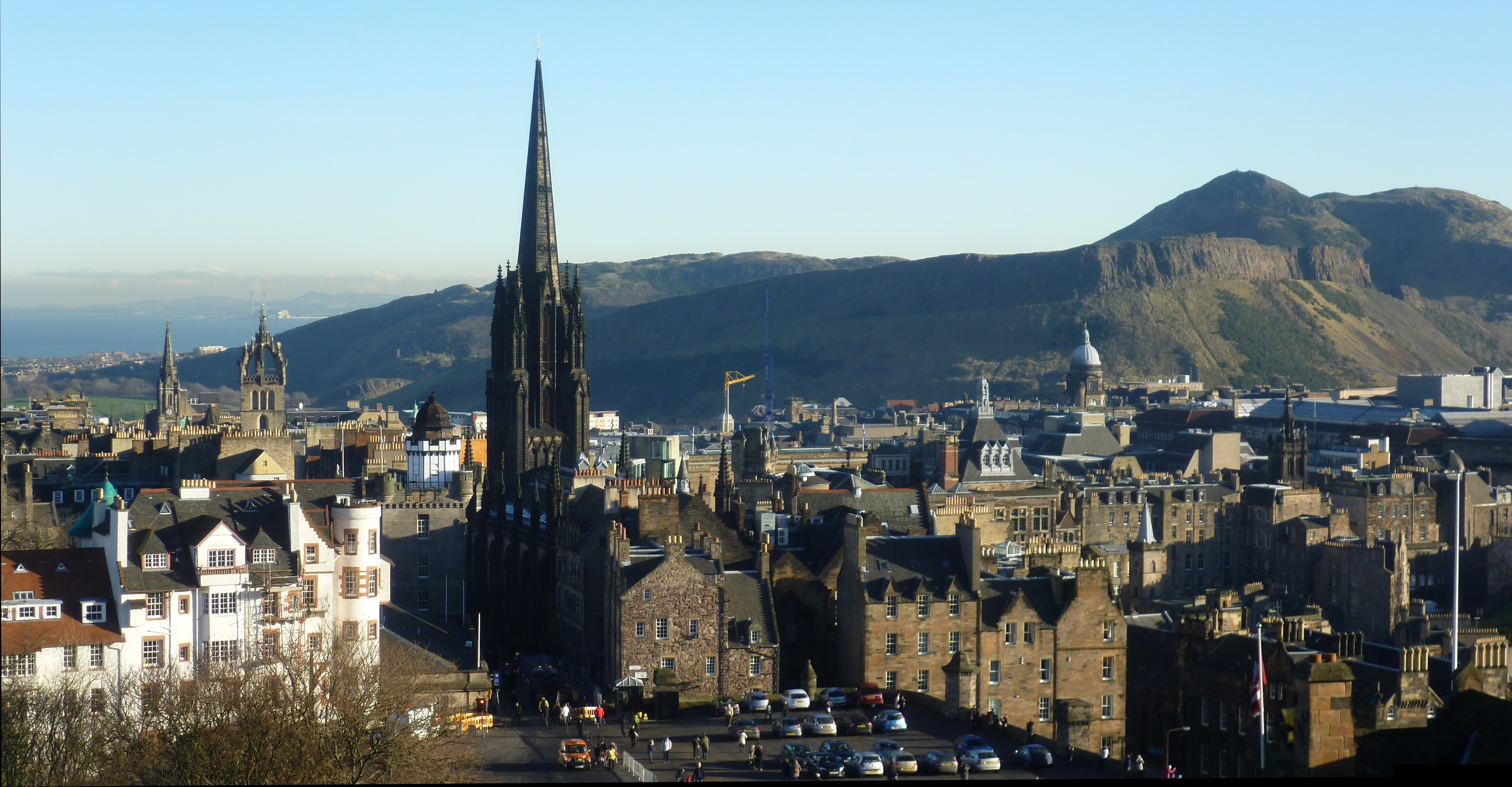
The Hub, seen from Edinburgh Castle

In the mid-19th century, the General Assembly of the Church of Scotland had been meeting in St Giles' Cathedral. At the time, St Giles was divided into four separate churches, each with its own congregation. From 1829-31, St Giles underwent restoration works led by architect William Burn, and the General Assembly had to relocate.

Initially, there were plans to restore the remains of Holyrood Abbey to designs by architects James Gillespie Graham and the renowned Gothic Revivalist Augustus Pugin to provide a new Assembly Hall, but this did not come to fruition. A new church called Knox Memorial church was being planned at the foot of Castlehill, and foundations had already been laid by Thomas Hamilton in 1829. The General Assembly decided instead to use this site and commissioned Graham to design a new building, known as the Victoria Hall. It was built between 1839 and 1844 to a design by Graham and Pugin, and a foundation stone was laid by Queen Victoria on 3 September 1842 during her first visit to Edinburgh. One of the church congregations from St Giles, the worshippers of the Tolbooth Kirk, also relocated to the new building in 1843.

In 1873 the parish was detached as a quoad sacra parish, and funding swapped from the town council to a committee set up by Rev Archibald Charteris.

A pipe organ by Eustace Ingram, Hope Jones and Co was installed and opened on Sunday 11 May 1902. A specification of the organ can be found on the National Pipe Organ Register.

The General Assembly met in the lower hall of the church until 1929, when the Church of Scotland reunited with the United Free Church of Scotland, and the amalgamated church decided to use the former United Free Church's General Assembly Hall on The Mound for future assemblies. The General Assembly of the Church of Scotland continues to meet on this site to this day. After 1929 the building was used by various congregations as a place of worship, although it was never actually consecrated as a Church. In 1956 it was named the Highland Tolbooth St John's Church. The congregation had been notable for holding services in Gaelic as well as English.

In 1979 the Tolbooth congregation united with the nearby Greyfriars Kirk and the Tolbooth Kirk building was closed. The building was then virtually unused until 1999 when it was redeveloped at a cost of £7.5m by architect Benjamin Tindall who preserved the exterior appearance of the building almost unchanged (with only the discreet addition of a service block over the Castlehill entrance) to create offices and a performance space for the Edinburgh International Festival and renamed "The Hub". The converted building was ceremonially opened by Queen Elizabeth in 1999.

=== Modern use ===
Today it is the home of the Edinburgh International Festival and is the central ticketing office, information centre and a performance venue for the International Festival. It is a multi-functional building comprising a performance space and venues for functions, conferences and weddings.

The inside houses the Hub Cafe; the central box office for the International Festival; a performance space with a capacity of 420; and two smaller venues, the Glass Room and the Dunard Library, suitable for smaller events.

Prior to the completion of the new Scottish Parliament Building at Holyrood in 2004, the Hub was occasionally used for meetings of the Scottish Parliament when the Church of Scotland's General Assembly Hall was unavailable. The Parliament returned to the Hub for two weeks following the collapse of a beam in its debating chamber on 2 March 2006.

== Architecture ==
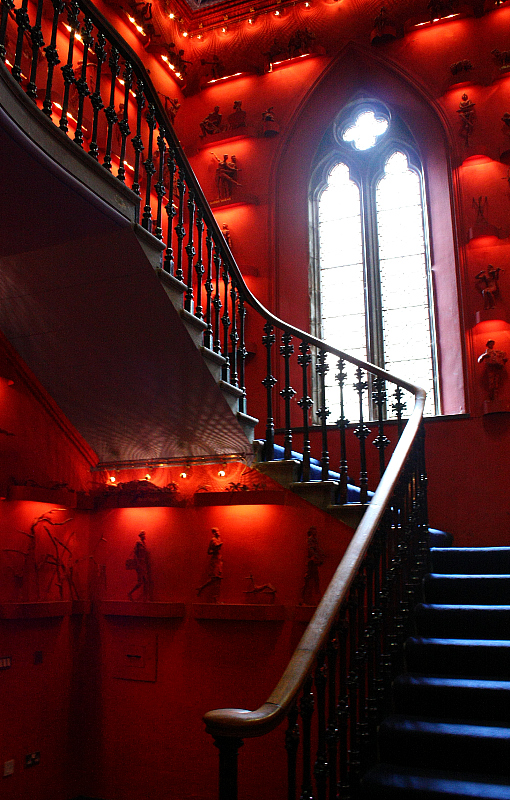
Pugin's interior has been retained, with contemporary artworks lining the Victorian stair

The building is situated on a corner site, at the junction of Castlehill, Johnston Terrace and the Lawnmarket, at the top of the Royal Mile. Its most prominent feature is the belfry/clock tower and tall pinnacled octagonal spire at its east end, overlooking the Lawnmarket. The clock was built by James Ritchie & Son. The old Tolbooth Kirk is considered to be a fine example of Gothic Revival architecture and it is noted for its ornately decorated stonework, carved in the Decorated Gothic style with features such as crockets, pinnacles, gablets and lancet windows.

Unusually for a church building, the Victoria Hall was constructed with two floors to accommodate its dual purpose; the ground floor was divided into committee rooms for the General Assembly, and the upper floor was given over to a large chamber which could be used for Christian worship or for the meetings of the General Assembly. Pugin, who had recently designed the Palace of Westminster in London, was experienced in designing buildings that recalled the glories of Medieval Europe, resolved to create a grand, impressive edifice to house the national church of Scotland. The interior of the main hall is decked with an ornate, rib-vaulted ceiling and is lined with carved wood panelling, including a decorated wooden screen, by Pugin and Gillespie Graham. At the east end is an ornate pulpit, topped with a wooden pinnacle, which incorporates elements of the chair of the Lord High Commissioner to the General Assembly of the Church of Scotland, designed by Pugin.

== See also ==
- Old Town, Edinburgh
