= Greyfriars Kirk =

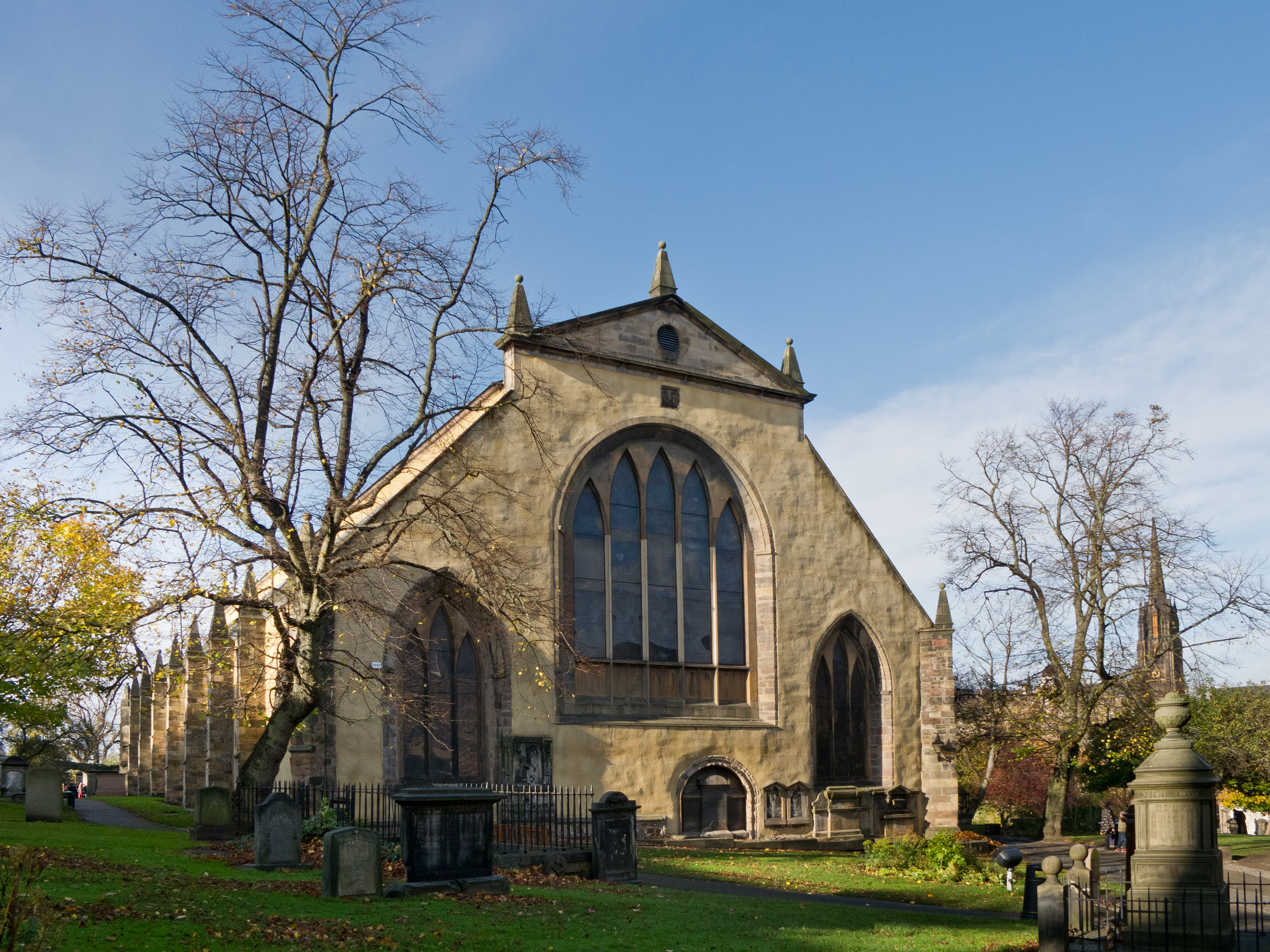
- East end of Greyfriars Kirk

- Location of Greyfriars Kirk within central Edinburgh
- 55°56′48″N 3°11′32″W
- Location: Old Town, Edinburgh, Scotland
- Country: Scotland
- Denomination: Church of Scotland

History
- Former name(s): Greyfriars, Tolbooth, and Highland Kirk (1979–2013)
- Status: Parish church
- Founded: 1620

Architecture
- Functional status: Active
- Heritage designation: Category A listed building
- Designated: 14 December 1970
- Architect(s): Clement Russell, Patrick Cochrane, Alexander McGill, David Bryce, David Cousin, Henry F. Kerr
- Style: Gothic, Baroque
- Groundbreaking: 1602
- Completed: 1620

Specifications
- Length: 162 feet (49 meters)
- Width: 72 feet (22 meters)

Listed Building – Category A
- Official name: Greyfriars Place, Greyfriars Church (Church of Scotland)
- Designated: 14 December 1970
- Reference no.: LB27018

Greyfriars Kirk (Scottish Gaelic: Eaglais nam Manach Liath) is a parish church of the Church of Scotland, located in the Old Town of Edinburgh, Scotland. It is surrounded by Greyfriars Kirkyard.

Greyfriars traces its origin to the south-west parish of Edinburgh, founded in 1598. Initially, this congregation met in the western portion of St Giles'. The church is named for the Franciscans or "Grey Friars," who arrived in Edinburgh from the Netherlands in the mid-15th century and were granted land for a Catholic friary at the south-western edge of the burgh.

In the wake of the Scottish Reformation, the grounds of the abandoned friary were repurposed as a cemetery, in which the current church was constructed between 1602 and 1620. In 1638, the National Covenant was first signed in the Kirk. The church was damaged during the Protectorate, when it was used as barracks by troops under Oliver Cromwell. In 1718, an explosion destroyed the church tower. During the reconstruction, the church was partitioned to hold two congregations: Old Greyfriars and New Greyfriars. In 1845, fire ravaged Old Greyfriars. After its reconstruction, the minister, Robert Lee, introduced the first organ and stained glass windows in a Scottish parish church since the Reformation. In 1929, Old and New Greyfriars united and the church was restored as one sanctuary. In the following years, the depopulation of the Old Town saw Greyfriars unite with a number of neighbouring congregations.

The church of Greyfriars is a simple aisled nave of eight bays; the style is Survival Gothic fused with Baroque elements. The church initially consisted of six bays and a west tower. After the explosion of 1718 destroyed the tower, Alexander McGill added two new bays and a Palladian north porch to create one building divided into two churches of four bays each. After it was gutted by fire in 1845, David Cousin rebuilt Old Greyfriars with an open, un-aisled interior. Between 1932 and 1938, the interior and arcades were restored by Henry F. Kerr. Notable features of the church include historic stained glass windows by James Ballantine; the 17th century monument to Margaret, Lady Yester; and an original copy of the National Covenant of 1638.

Since the 18th century, the congregations of Greyfriars have been notable for their missionary work within the parish. This continues to the present day through the church's work with the Grassmarket Community Project and the Greyfriars Charteris Centre. Greyfriars holds weekly Gaelic services, maintaining a tradition of Gaelic worship in Edinburgh that goes back to the beginning of the 18th century.

== History ==
=== Edinburgh's Grey Friars ===
Catholic friars of the Observatine Franciscans first came to Scotland in 1447 at the invitation of James I. The six friars, including one Scot, arrived from the Low Countries under the leadership of Cornelius of Zierikzee. They settled at the corner of the Grassmarket and Candlemaker Row in either 1453 or 1458. In 1464, the Provost of St Giles' granted the Chapel of St John outwith the West Port to Friar Crannok, Warden of the Grey Friars. The fate of this chapel is unknown.

The friary enjoyed royal patronage and connections: it hosted Mary of Guelders on her arrival in Edinburgh in 1449 and sheltered Henry VI of England during his exile. James IV was particularly close to the Edinburgh Grey Friars: he appointed himself the Observatines' "Royal Protector" and Friar Ranny, Warden of the Edinburgh Grey Friars, served as the King's confessor. By the middle of the 16th century, there were always fifty to sixty friars resident.

The friary was first caught up in the Scottish Reformation in 1558: Reformers stole the statue of Saint Giles from the burgh church and the Greyfriars loaned their statue of the saint for use in the Saint Giles' Day procession on 1 September that year. The statue was damaged when Reformers broke up the procession. When news reached Edinburgh of the advance of the Lords of the Congregation on 28 June 1559, Lord Seton, Provost of Edinburgh, abandoned his commitment to protect the Grey Friars, leaving their Friary to be ransacked by a mob. The friars sheltered among their allies in the city. In the summer of 1560, Scotland's Observantine Franciscans, including all but one or two of the Edinburgh Grey Friars, left the country for the Netherlands: these exiles numbered about eighty friars and were led by the Provincial Minister, John Patrick.

=== Beginnings ===
By 1565, all the buildings of the Friary had been removed and their stones carried away for use in the construction of the New Tolbooth and to repair St Giles' and its kirkyard walls. The kirkyard of St Giles' was, by then, overcrowded and Mary, Queen of Scots had, in 1562, given the grounds of the Friary to the town council to use as a burial ground.

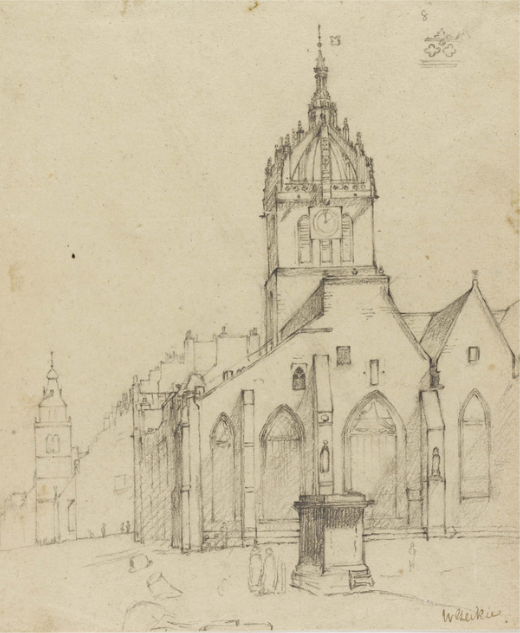
The west end of St Giles' prior to 19th century alterations. From its foundation in 1598, the congregation of Edinburgh's south-west parish met in the upper storey of the Tolbooth partition in the west end of St Giles'.

The congregation of Greyfriars can trace its origin to a 1584 edict of the town council to divide Edinburgh into four parishes. This created a south-west parish with the intention it would meet in the central section of St Giles'. This edict does not appear to have been enforced until 1598, when the south-west parish was allocated to the Upper Tolbooth partition at the west end of St Giles'. Robert Rollock and Peter Hewat were appointed the first ministers.

By the end of the 16th century, St Giles' could no longer accommodate Edinburgh's growing population. In 1599, the town council had discussed and abandoned proposals to construct a new church in the grounds of Kirk o' Field (around modern-day Chambers Street). In 1601, the council decided to build a new church in the southern part of the Greyfriars burying ground. Construction commenced in 1611, using material from the Convent of Catherine of Siena at Sciennes. A merchant, Thomas Watsoun, bought timber from Sweden for the roof in 1612. Two of his ships were captured by Christian IV of Denmark who was then at war with Sweden.

The Kirk was first used on 18 February 1619 for the funeral of the William Couper, Bishop of Galloway; John Spottiswoode, Archbishop of St Andrews, preached the funeral sermon. Congregational worship was first held on Christmas Day 1620. Though this was a Monday, the minister, Patrick Galloway, chose to hold the service on Christmas Day to curry favour with James VI, who disapproved of the radical Reformers' opposition to holy days.

=== Covenant and conflict ===
At the establishment of the Diocese of Edinburgh in 1633, the ministers of Greyfriars were placed on the list of prebendaries of St Giles' Cathedral. In 1637, Charles I attempted to impose a Service Book on the Church of Scotland. On 23 July that year, James Fairlie read the new service book in Greyfriars: this caused a tumult, in which Fairlie exchanged curses with the women of the congregation. Fairlie's colleague, Andrew Ramsay, refused to read the Service Book the following Sunday and was deposed by royal authority.

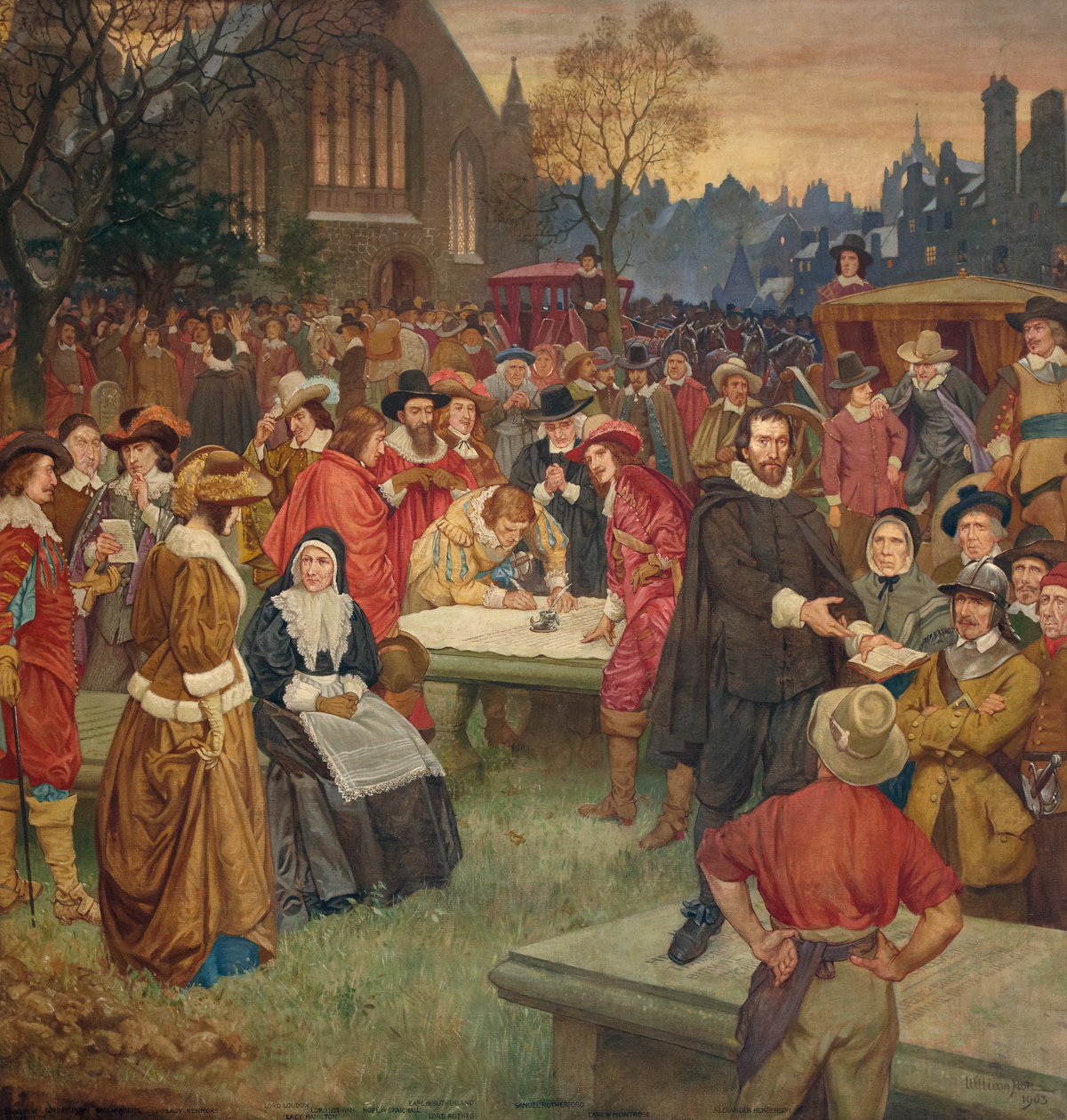
The signing of the National Covenant at Greyfriars in 1638 (Note: Some secondary accounts describe the signing of the Covenant in the kirkyard; however, all first-hand accounts describe the signing as having taken place only in the Kirk itself.)

The events of 23 July mirrored a similar incident and riot at St Giles' on the same day. Resistance to Charles and William Laud's interference in the Scottish church resulted in the National Covenant. The Covenant was first read by Archibald Johnston of Warriston from the pulpit of Greyfriars; Scotland's nobility and gentry then signed the Covenant inside the church. Copies of the Covenant were carried throughout Edinburgh and Leith to be signed by the masses. The formation and subsequent ascendancy of the Covenanters led to the Bishops' Wars, the first conflict of the Wars of the Three Kingdoms.

In 1650, as troops of Oliver Cromwell approached Edinburgh, all able-bodied men of the town were ordered to assemble in the kirkyard. Cromwell took the city after the defeat of the Covenanters at Dunbar and, between 1650 and 1653, Cromwell's troops occupied the church as a cavalry barracks and caused significant damage. Cromwell himself may have preached in Greyfriars. In 1656, the church was divided by a partition wall in anticipation of the creation of two new parishes in Edinburgh; this never happened and the partition was removed in 1662.

In 1660, General Monck announced in Greyfriars his intention to march south in support of the Restoration. After the Restoration, episcopacy was re-established in the Church of Scotland: this led to a new period of rebellion for the Covenanters. Robert Traill, the covenanting minister of Greyfriars, was forced into exile and Covenanters were imprisoned in a field adjoining the kirkyard after the Battle of Bothwell Brig in 1679. After the Glorious Revolution, Presbyterian polity was re-established in the Church of Scotland. William Carstares, who had served as chaplain and adviser to William II, served as minister of Greyfriars between 1703 and 1707.

=== Destruction and reconstruction: 1718–1843 ===
From 1706, the town council used the tower at the west end of Greyfriars as a gunpowder store; this exploded at around 1.45 a.m. on Sunday, 7 May 1718, destroying the tower and severely damaging the west end of the church. The congregation met in the chapel of George Heriot's School and the "Lower Commonhall" of the University of Edinburgh while the church was repaired.

Alexander McGill oversaw repairs to the church. A new wall was erected to enclose the eastern four bays within a month of the explosion. Two new bays were added to the west end: this created a church divided into two equal halves. The work was completed by 31 December 1722 and the costs were met by a local duty on ale. The following autumn, the town council ordered the formation of a new congregation to occupy the western half of the Kirk and William Robertson was elected its first minister: this was known Wester Greyfriars then as New Greyfriars. The original congregation met in the eastern half and became known as Old Greyfriars. From the schools' foundations to the late 19th century, New Greyfriars contained lofts for the pupils of the Merchant Maiden Hospital and George Heriot's School, who had moved from Old Greyfriars; after 1871, the pupils of George Watson's College also attended services in the church.

In 1840, St John's Church on Victoria Street was formed from the parish of Old Greyfriars; the minister of the second charge in Old Greyfriars, Thomas Guthrie, became the first minister of St John's. At the Disruption of 1843, John Sym, the minister Old Greyfriars, left to join the Free Church; although many of his congregation left with him, all the elders remained.

=== Fire and the "Greyfriars Revolution" ===
On 19 January 1845, a boiler flue overheated, causing a fire that gutted Old Greyfriars and damaged the roof and furnishings of New Greyfriars. As it happened soon after the Disruption of 1843, some suggested the fire was divine judgement on the established church. Hugh Miller unsuccessfully argued the congregations should move to St John's Church on Victoria Street and leave Greyfriars as a scenic ruin. The majority of the town council's members had joined the Free Church and their attempts to frustrate the restoration were one of the reasons it ended up taking twelve years. The congregation temporarily decamped to the Tolbooth Kirk.

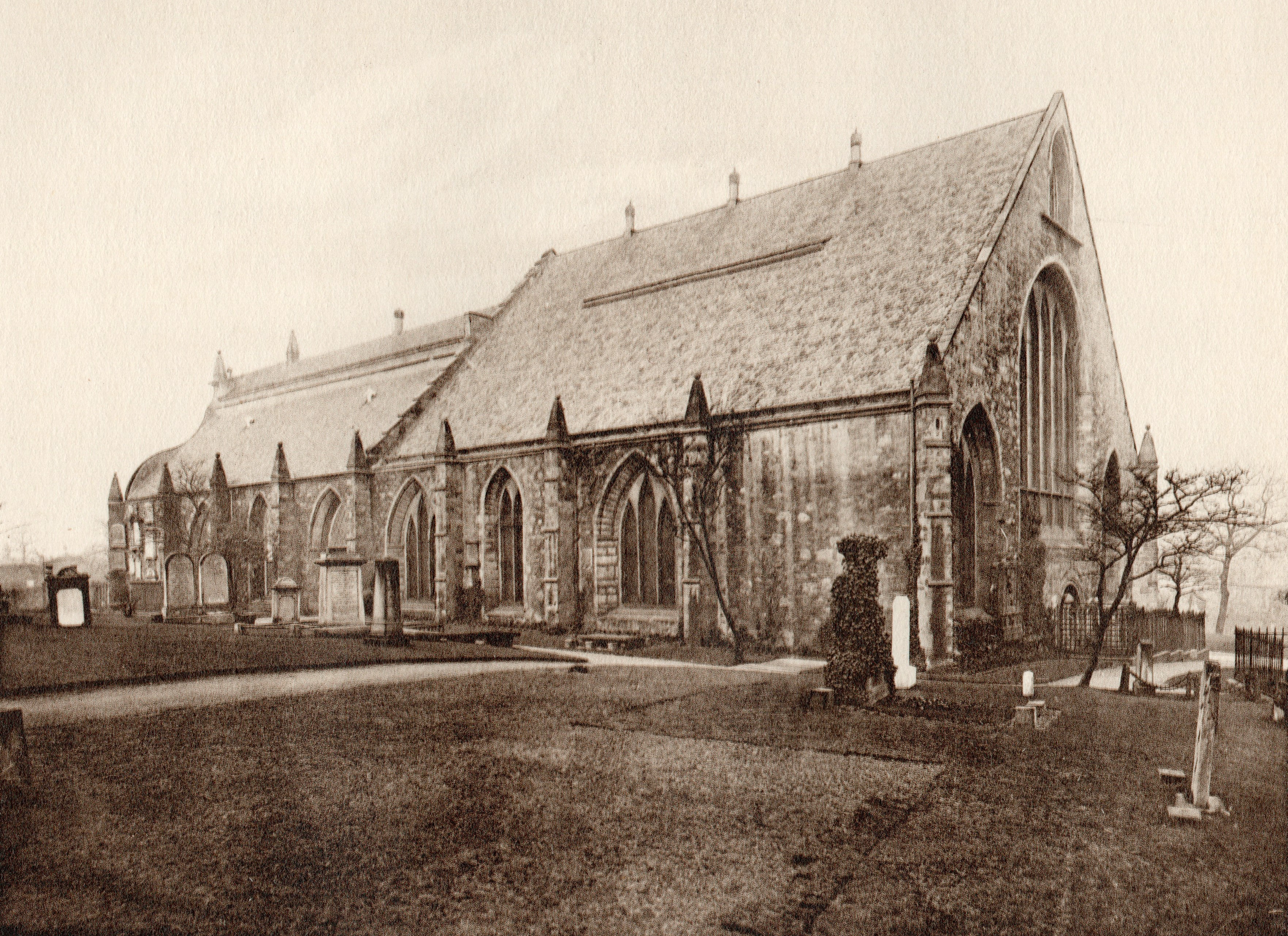
The exterior of Greyfriars as restored by David Cousin after the fire of 1845. Note the contrast in the shape of the roof between Old Greyfriars (right) and New Greyfriars (left).

During the restoration of Old Greyfriars under David Cousin, painted glass was installed at the request of the minister, Robert Lee: this was the first coloured glass to be installed in a building of the Church of Scotland since the Reformation. After the church reopened in 1857, Lee embarked upon what became known as "the Greyfriars Revolution": he introduced a service book of his own devising and pioneered the practices of standing for praise, kneeling for worship, and saying prepared prayers. These practices were innovative in Scottish Presbyterianism and Lee temporarily desisted under pressure from the General Assembly of the Church of Scotland. Later, he resumed the practice of prepared prayers and installed a harmonium in 1863 and an organ in 1865. Lee died in 1868 before further action could be taken against him. Lee proved highly influential in the development of Presbyterian liturgy: pipe organs, stained glass, prepared prayers, and standing for praise would all become common in the Church of Scotland during the decades after Lee's death.

=== 20th and 21st centuries ===
In 1929, the congregations of Old and New Greyfriars united. Between 1932 and 1938, the whole church was restored by Henry F. Kerr and the wall that had divided the two congregations was removed. In 1938, the congregation of Lady Yester's Kirk united with Greyfriars; the congregation of the New North Church joined Greyfriars in 1941.

On 28 February 1979, the congregation of Highland, Tolbooth, St John's united with Greyfriars and the new congregation adopted the name "Greyfriars, Tolbooth, and Highland Kirk". Initially, the congregation used both churches but it was decided in 1981 only to use Greyfriars. Since this union, Greyfriars has maintained the tradition of the Edinburgh's Highland congregation by hosting regular Gaelic language services.

During the 1990s, a church museum was developed in a room in the western part of the church; this was refurbished in 2012. In 2013, Kirk o' Field Parish Church united with Greyfriars and the congregation re-adopted the name "Greyfriars Kirk". Since 2016, the Kirk o' Field buildings have been used by the church as the Greyfriars Charteris Centre.

== Setting and kirkyard ==
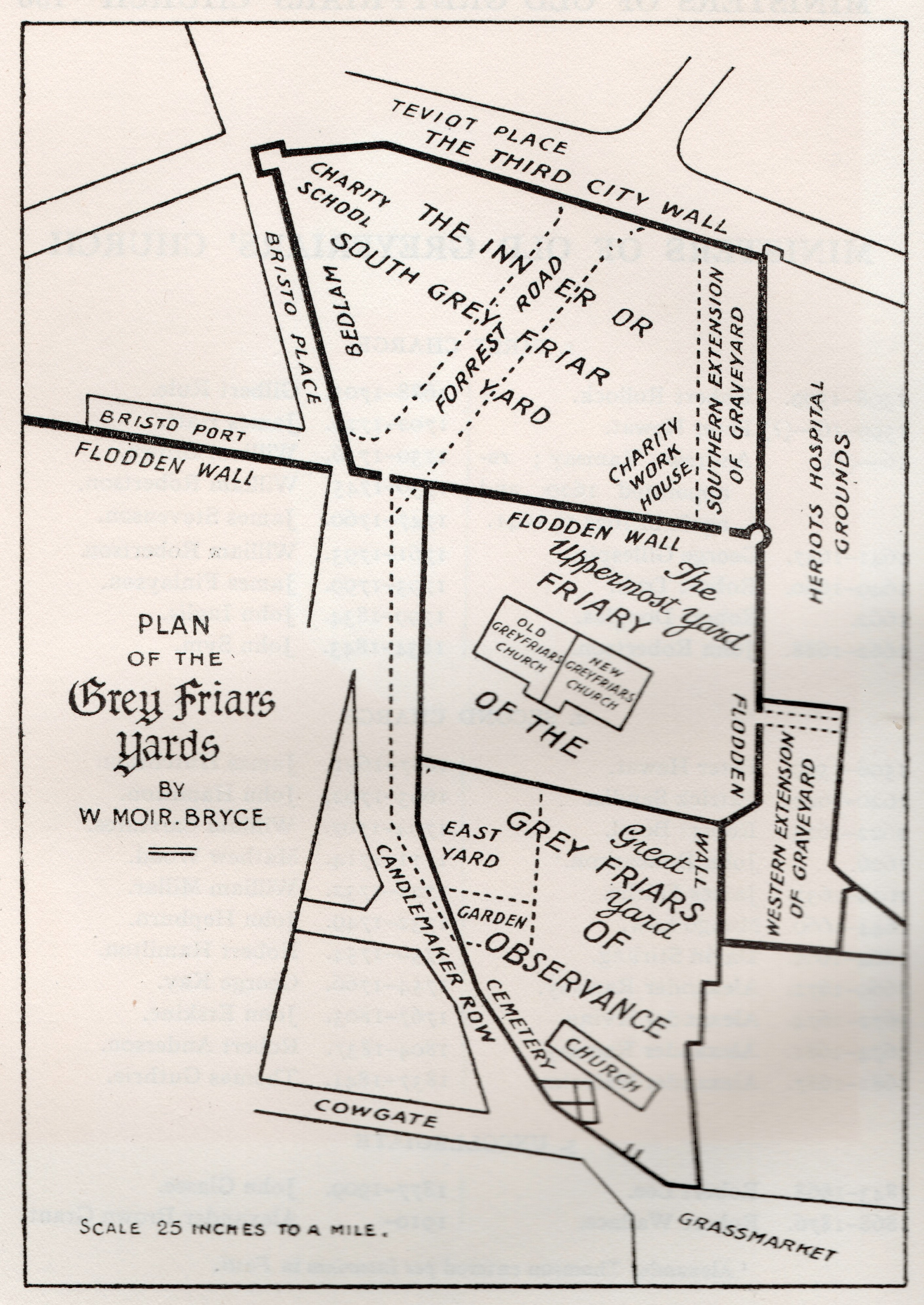
A map of the historic development of the area around Greyfriars

Greyfriars is set among Greyfriars Kirkyard, which is bounded to the north by the Grassmarket and to the east by Candlemaker Row. This is the same site given to the Observatine Franciscans during the reign of James I at the edge of the Old Town of Edinburgh. It was then a relatively open space: there were only two tenements at the eastern side of the grounds; now the north and east sides of the kirkyard are enclosed by buildings. Prior to occupation by the friars, these lands had been owned by the family of the Tours of Inverleith since 1388; the friars' rights to the land were confirmed by James III in 1479.

The southern and western walls of the Friary's grounds were strengthened between 1513 and 1515 to create part of the Flodden Wall. At the creation of the burial ground in 1562, a gate was installed at the site of the current north gate of the kirkyard. Since the construction of the Kirk, a causewayed path has connected this to the Kirk's north door. The current gateway on Greyfriars Place opposite the junction of Candlemaker Row and George IV Bridge was added in 1624. Until 1591, burials were restricted to the northern half of the site; the Upper Yard, where the Kirk now stands, was held by the magistrates and wapinschaws were conducted there.

== Architecture ==
=== Description ===
The current church is rectangular in plan, consisting of a single nave of eight bays with aisles along the whole length of the church on either side. The church's architectural style can be described as "Survival Gothic" – that is, Gothic architecture that continued after the Reformation – fused with Baroque. The exterior walls of the church consist of harled rubble with ashlar dressings. The church is 162 feet (49 meters) long by 72 feet (22 meters) wide. Externally, each bay is divided by buttresses, each of which is capped by a ball-topped obelisk finial. The buttresses at each corner of the church rest diagonally. The roof rises steeply above the aisles to a short course of wall, above which the roof over the nave continues at a shallower pitch.

Each bay, save the easternmost bays on either side and the westernmost on the south side, has a window. Most of these windows have been enlarged by lowering the sills, which, in three cases, has resulted in the removal of a doorway below. In the third bay from the east on the south side, the remains of the former south doorway are visible. The western three windows on the north side and the westernmost window of the south side are simple lancets with no tracery. All the windows of the western half of the church are clusters of lancet lights. The third window from the west on the south side holds three lights and intersecting tracery while, in the second window from the west on the same side, two lancet lights support a light in the shape of a mandorla.

In each of the middle two bays of the north side stands a round-arched doorway with a sculpted angel's head on the keystone. Above the westernmost of these two sits a late-Gothic niche bracket bearing the arms of Edinburgh. These north doors are enclosed by a large, pedimented Palladian porch in channelled masonry of three bays and two storeys. The ground level is entered by round-headed arches while three rectangular windows illuminate the upper storey. Internally, the upper storey of this porch contains two vestries accessed by a wooden turnpike stair.

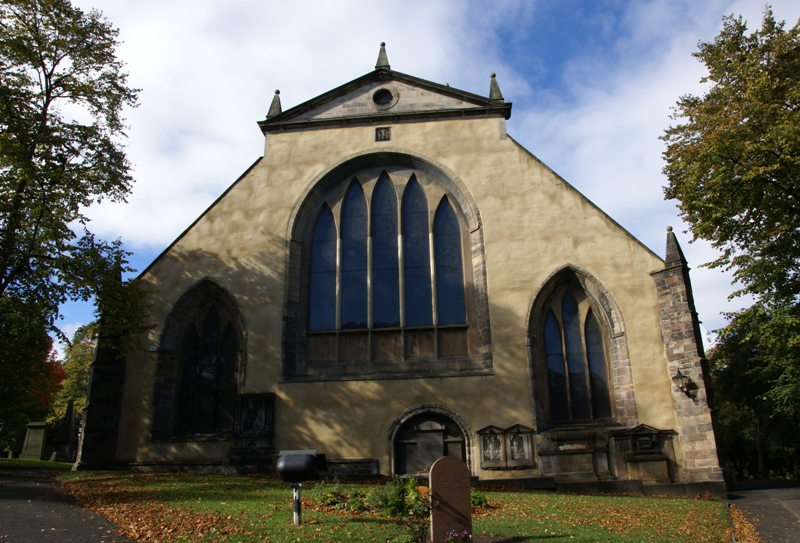
The east gable

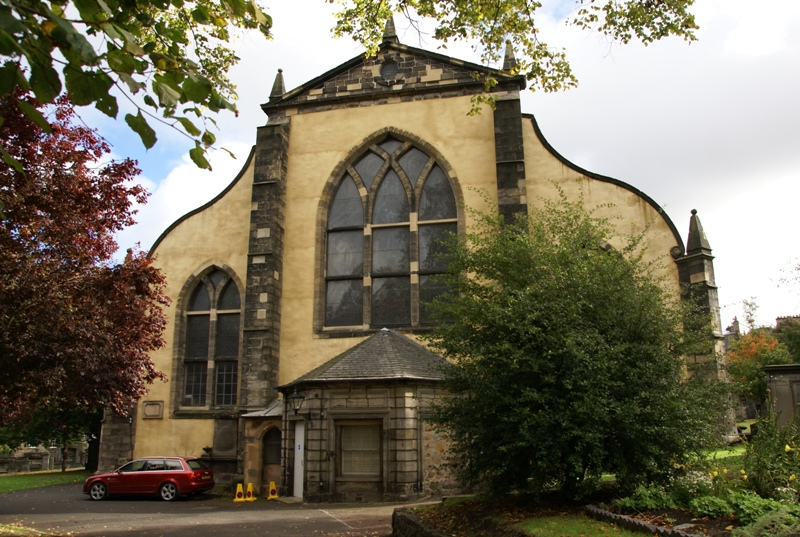
The west gable

The east gable is surmounted by a Classical pediment whose ends and apex are topped by ball-topped obelisk finials. The pediment contains a small oculus. The main window is round-arched and consists of a cluster of five lancet lights while the lancet windows in the gable of either aisle hold three lancet lights. Between the apex of the central window and the pediment is a stone marked 1614, which shows the arms of Edinburgh. Below the central window stands the round-arched former doorway of the East church, now built-up.

The west end of the church takes the form of a Dutch gable; the pediment is almost identical to that of the east gable while curving skews crown the gables of the aisles. The central section of the east gable is supported by buttresses, which reach to the foot of the pediment. The central window is a large lancet of three lights with intersecting tracery. The aisle gable windows hold two lights under Y-shaped tracery. Below the central window at the east end is a low, Renaissance-style semi-octagonal porch with a door in each of the three full faces and a pitched roof.

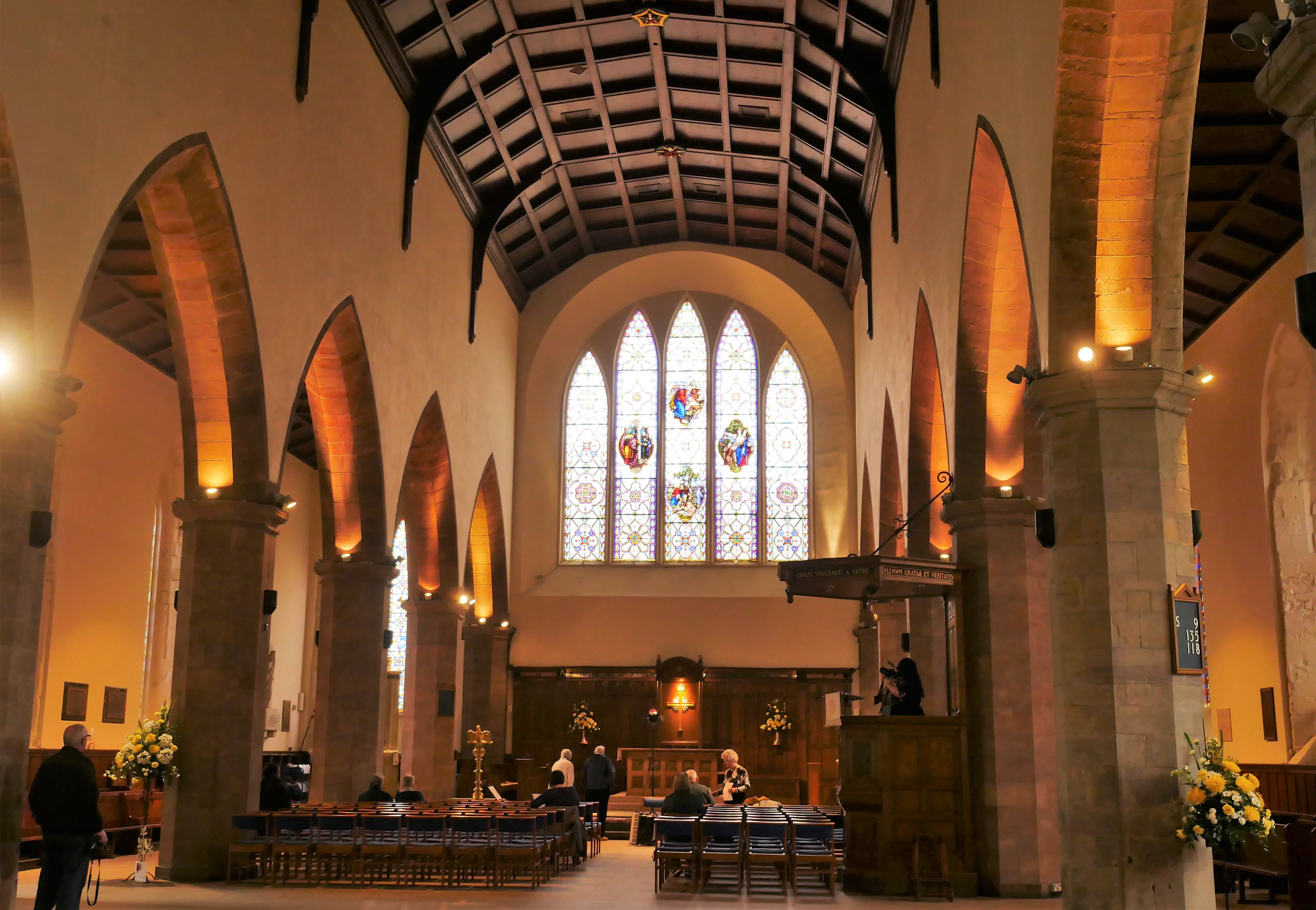
The interior in the 21st century, showing the timber ceiling and reconstructed arcades added by Henry F. Kerr in 1932–38.

Internally, octagonal pillars bear parallel arcades of chamfered pointed arches that run along eight bays; these are interrupted only by a lateral arch that divides the western two bays from the rest of the church. The aisles of these bays are partitioned off to form rooms and the arch frames the organ loft. In these two western bays, a plaster vault forms the ceiling while the eastern six bays are covered by a timber barrelled ceiling supported on timber shafts that rise from corbels in the wall above each pillar. A boss rests where each arch between corresponding shafts crosses the longitudinal rib; these depict emblems of Saint Andrew, Saint Margaret, and each person of the Trinity.

=== Architectural history ===
==== The first church ====
Work on the church had commenced by 1602, when Clement Russell is described as "maister of wark to the Kirk begun in the buriell plaice". In that year, the town council also ordered the removal of the buttresses and doors of the Convent of Catherine of Siena at Sciennes for use in the construction of the new church. Work appears to have continued in 1603 and 1604, when Patrick Cochrane is referenced as master of works. Thereafter, work appears to have stopped until the town council moved to recommence work in 1611; but only in December 1612 did they order construction to "gang forward with all convenient expeditioun". A date stone on the east gable is marled 1614 the north east pillar, now replaced, was recorded to have been marked 1613: these suggest significant progress had been made by these dates; however, the church only opened in 1620.

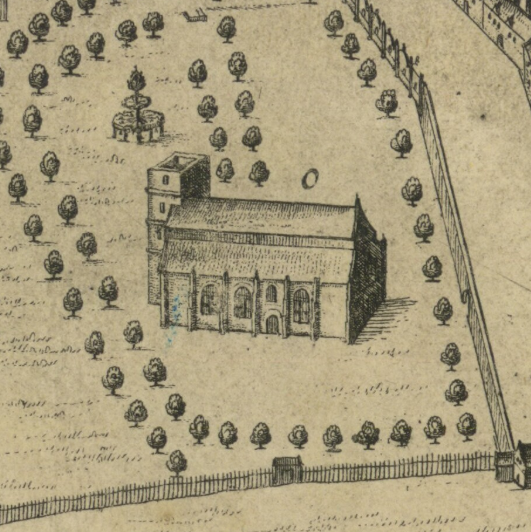
A detail of James Gordon of Rothiemay's map of 1647, showing Greyfriars Kirk as it appeared when first built. This is the only depiction of the church prior to the explosion of 1718.

At its completion, the church consisted of an aisled nave of six bays with external buttresses; a squat, square-based tower at the west end; and a curvilinear gable at the east end. Doors stood in the north, south, and east walls and probably in the exterior wall of the tower. Internally, the octagonal pillars may have evoked similar pillars in St Giles'. There were originally galleries on the east, west, and probably north sides to face the pulpit, which stood against the middle south pillar. The church was damaged during its occupation by the English Army under Oliver Cromwell and subsequently repaired. Between 1656 and 1662 a lateral partition wall divided the interior. The galleries were expanded in 1696.

Greyfriars was the first church built in Edinburgh since the Reformation and it was the largest post-Reformation church building in Scotland until well into the 18th century. According to George Hay, the form of an aisled nave, while "exceptional" in post-Reformation Scotland, did not represent a step back to pre-Reformation practices. The lack of a chancel reflected the communal emphasis of Reformed worship while the overall form was "the only formula then known in these islands for a large church".

==== Rebuilding after 1718 ====
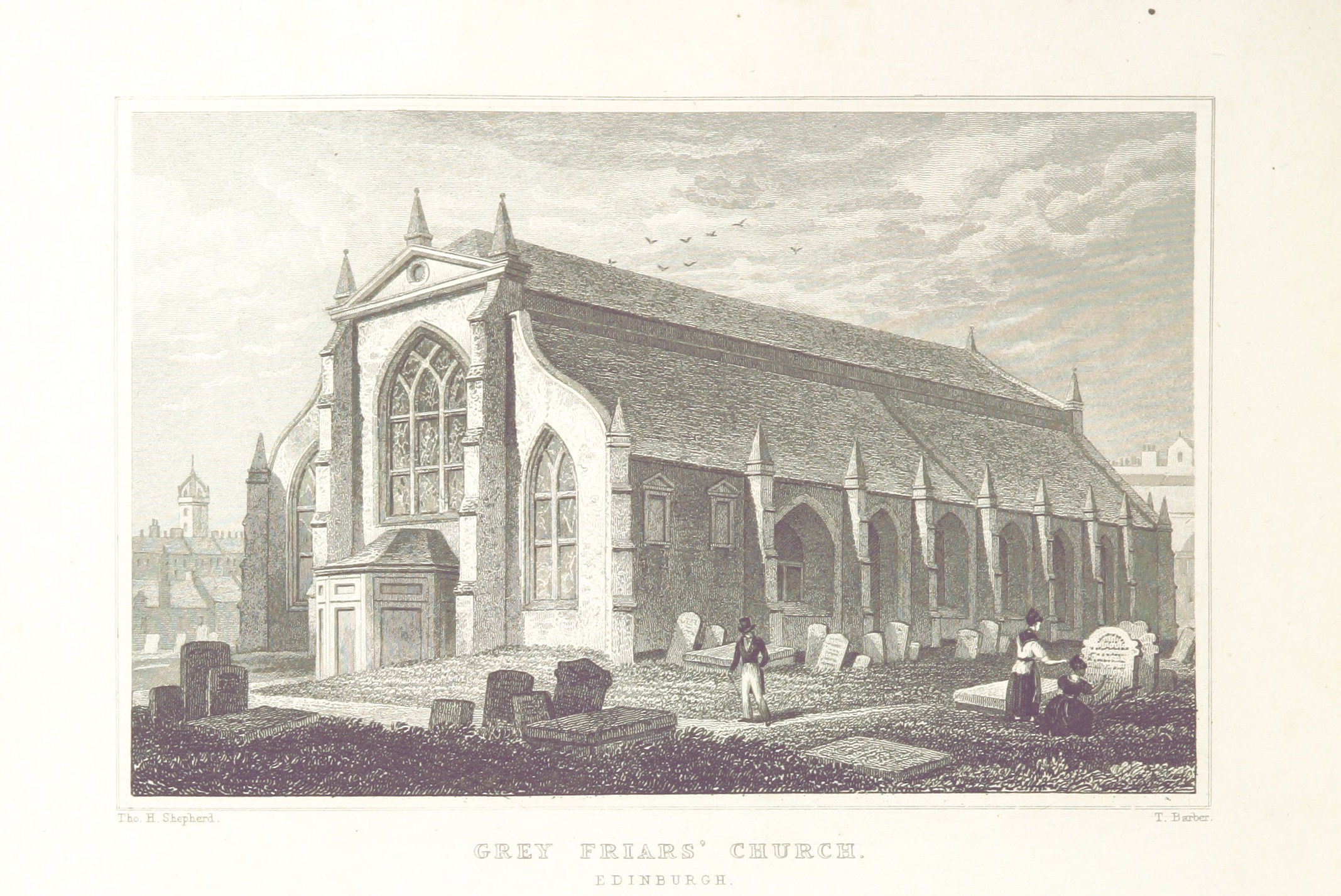
A view of Greyfriars from the west in 1829, showing the external appearance of the church between 1722 and 1845

On 2 May 1718, the gunpowder store on the third and fourth floors of the tower ignited. A contemporary record by the Kirk's Session Clerk describes the explosion as having "…Rent the Western Gevell of the Church, broke all the glass windows, and turned the Sclates of the Church, and broke a great deal of the Leadden high roof of the Church". The town council's first step was to enclose the eastern four bays with a wall in which stood a turnpike stair. Galleries were then added to make up for lost space; the former north door was moved one bay east and its keystone was adorned with a carving of an angel's head; plaster ceilings, coombed in the aisles and barrel-vaulted over the nave, were raised. In November 1719, the town council commissioned Alexander McGill to build a new church in the western half with Gilbert Smith as mason. McGill's plans effectively reversed the design of the existing church. The remains of the tower were demolished and two new bays were added to the west end of the damaged bays. This created spaces for two congregations: Old Greyfriars at the East and New Greyfriars at the West. Inside New Greyfriars, galleries on the north, south, and west sides faced a pulpit against the middle south pillar.

McGill created a Dutch gable with Classical pediment at the western end and, below this, added the semi-octagonal porch. He also replicated the north door in the bay immediately west. McGill added a near-identical pediment over the east gable and topped the pediments and buttresses with ball-topped obelisk finials. In 1722, McGill added the Palladian north porch to enclose the north doors; he also recast the curvilinear east gable, adding a Classical pediment to replicate the one at the west end.

==== Repairs after 1845 ====
On the morning of Sunday, 19 January 1845, fire gutted Old Greyfriars, causing the partial collapse of the arcades and wrecking the furnishings of New Greyfriars. David Bryce designed new furnishings for New Greyfriars: a tall wainscot was installed and north, south, east galleries now faced a canopied pulpit at the west end. New Greyfriars re-opened in 1846.

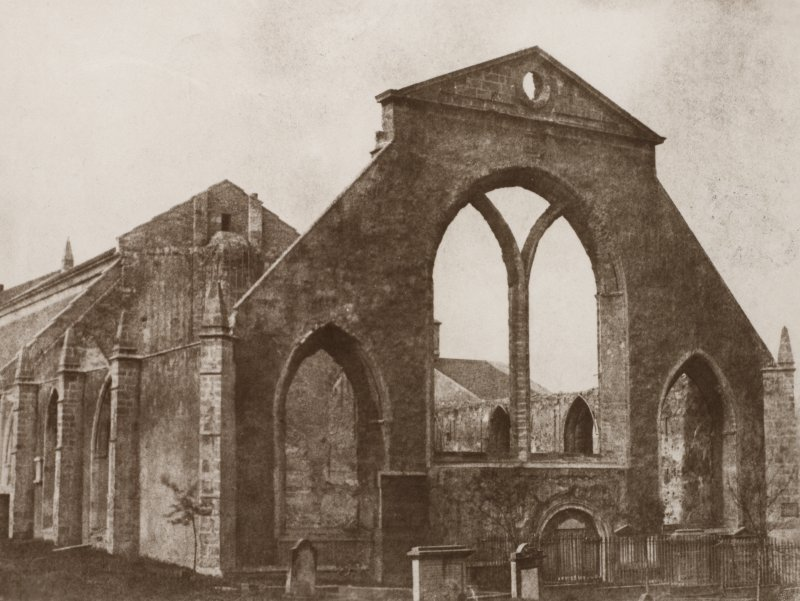
The east gable of Greyfriars after the fire of 1845. Note the pediment and "Y"-traceried window, which date from the restoration of 1719–22.

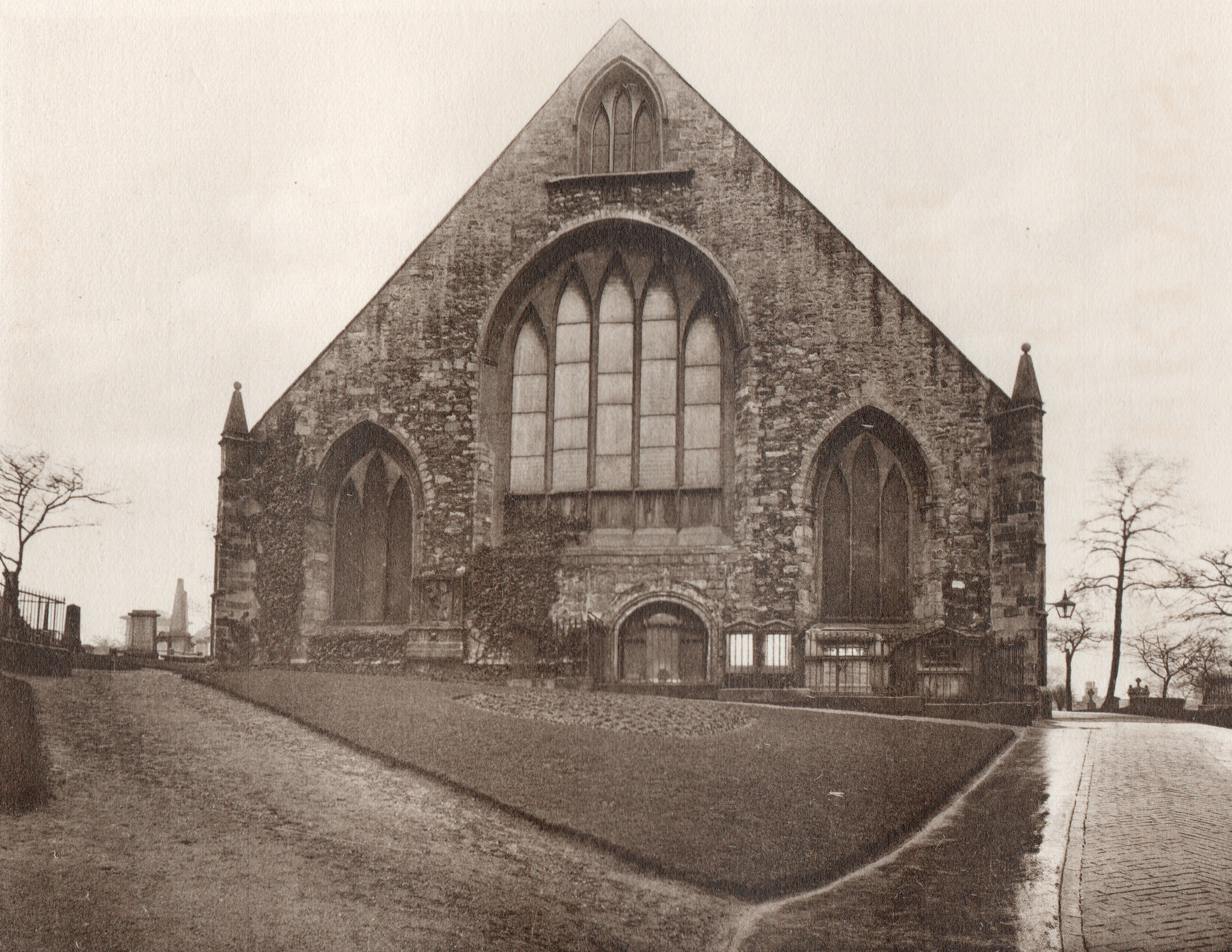
The east gable of Greyfriars after David Cousin's restoration (completed 1857). Clusters of lancets have replaced the earlier tracery and the pediment has been replaced by a steeply-pitched gable with a new window beneath its apex.

The restoration of Old Greyfriars took twelve years. Initially, James Smith was appointed architect but was responsible for little more than removing the roof and demolishing the remaining arcades. In 1856 and 1857, David Cousin radically rebuilt Old Greyfriars. In the windows, he inserted ashlar pierced by "Early English" lancet lights. He created a simple, triangular gable at the east end with a new lancet of three lights between the top of the central window and the apex of the gable. The arcades were not reconstructed, leaving an open interior covered by a single-span timber ceiling beneath a steeply pitched roof. In its time, Cousin's restoration of Old Greyfriars was "acclaimed as a sign that Presbyterianism had admitted Art as a handmaid of religion". Around the time of the 1930s restoration, however, Andrew Landale Drummond would criticise the "effect of bleak though ornate ugliness". A re-ordering of Old Greyfriars' interior was undertaken by Herbert Honeyman in 1912.

==== 1932 onwards ====
The present appearance of the church dates from a restoration of 1932 to 1938 overseen by Henry F. Kerr. Kerr removed the partition wall to reunite the interior and reconstructed the arcade in the eastern four bays. He maintained the plaster vaulted ceiling over the two western bays and separated these from the rest of the church by a lateral arch. Over the remaining six bays, he installed a barreled ceiling of California redwood. The woodwork of New Greyfriars was used to form a gallery under the western arch. In 1989, this was replaced by a new organ loft, accessed by a staircase made from redundant pitch pine pews.

Kerr replaced David Cousin's pitched roof over Old Greyfriars with a two-stage roof in continuity with that over the western half of the church. He also recreated the pediment over the eastern gable.

== Features ==
=== Stained glass ===
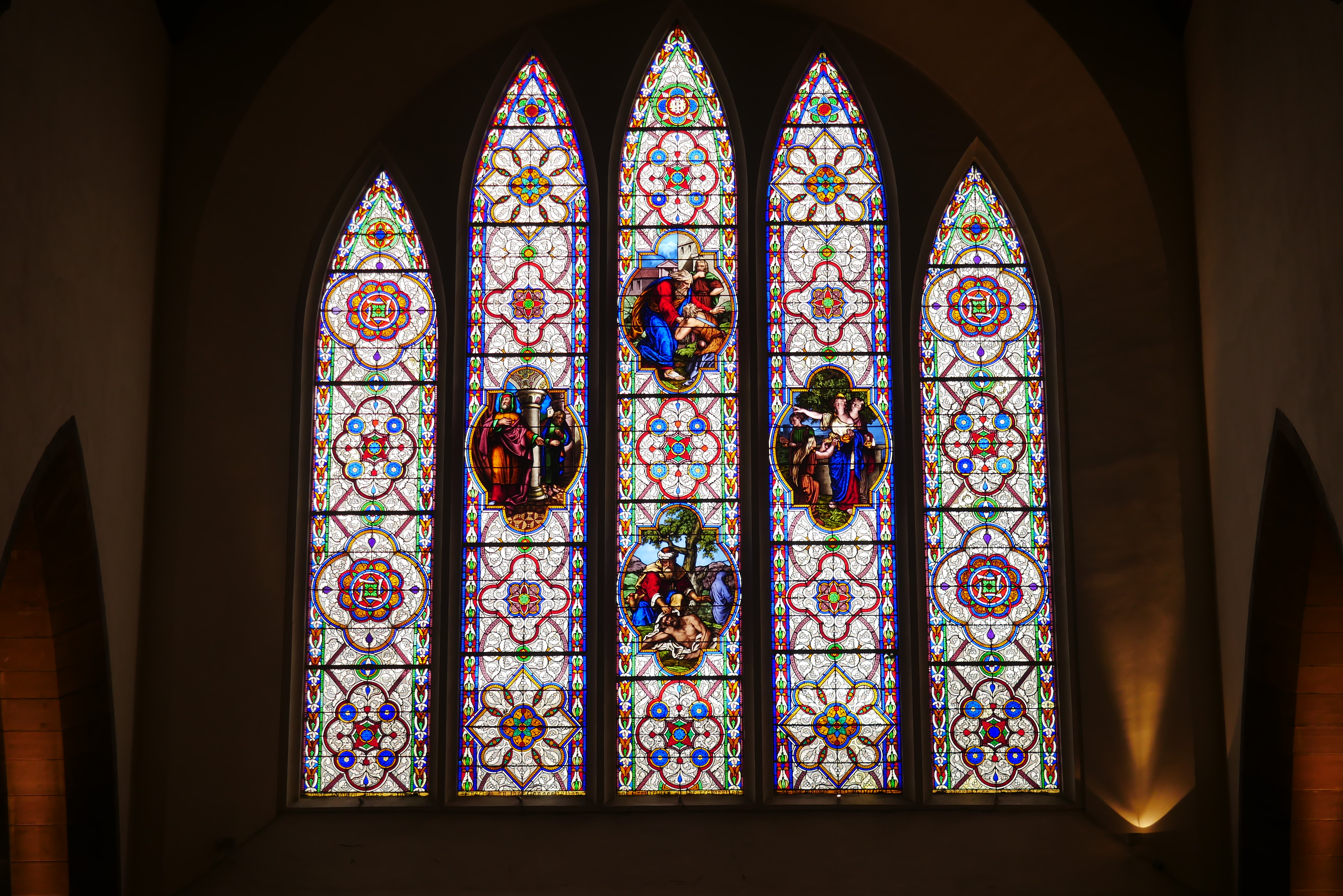
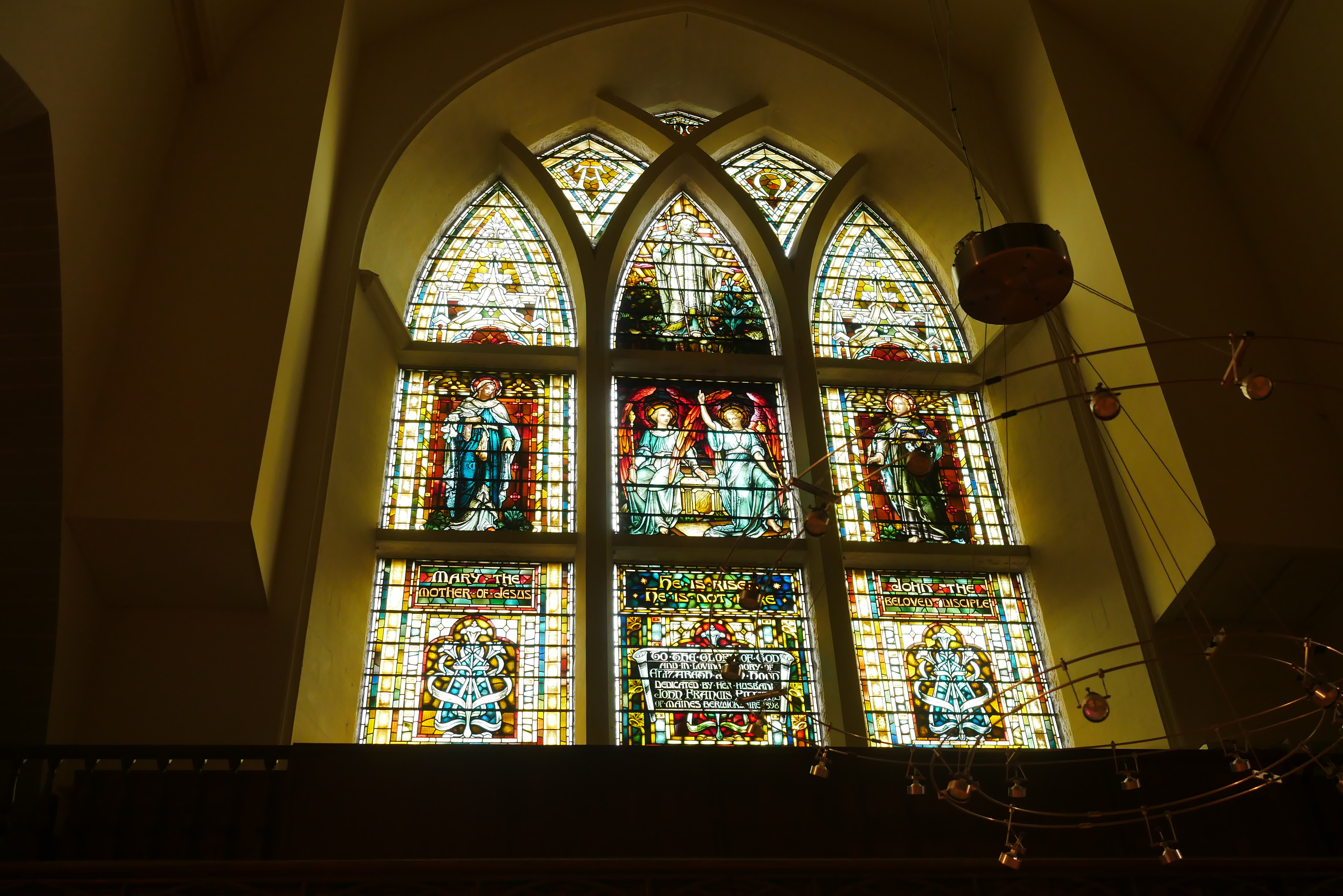

The windows of the eastern four bays of the church are the oldest stained glass windows in a Church of Scotland building: when they were added at the direction of Robert Lee in 1857, they were the first coloured windows in a Scottish parish church since the Reformation. These windows are effectively grisaille with abstract patterning except the east window, which also incorporates medallions depicting the Prodigal Son, the Wise and Foolish Virgins, the Good Samaritan, and the Pharisee and the Publican. Windows of this period commemorate John Erskine, Robert Traill, George Buchanan, William Robertson, and John Inglis. These windows were all executed by Ballantine and Allen except the Anderson memorial window in the north aisle, which is by Francis Barnett.

Further west along the south aisle, the Saint John the Baptist window was removed from Highland, Tolbooth, St John's in 1979. It had been presented there in 1945 by David Young Cameron to commemorate St John's Church. Next to this is a window by Marjorie Kemp in memory of Helen Pearl Gardiner; this depicts Saint Helen and Saint Margaret. The central window of the west end shows the morning of the Resurrection; it was executed by Ballantine and Gardiner in 1898. A millennium window depicting an abstract Celtic cross was designed by Douglas Hogg and added in 2000.

=== Organs ===
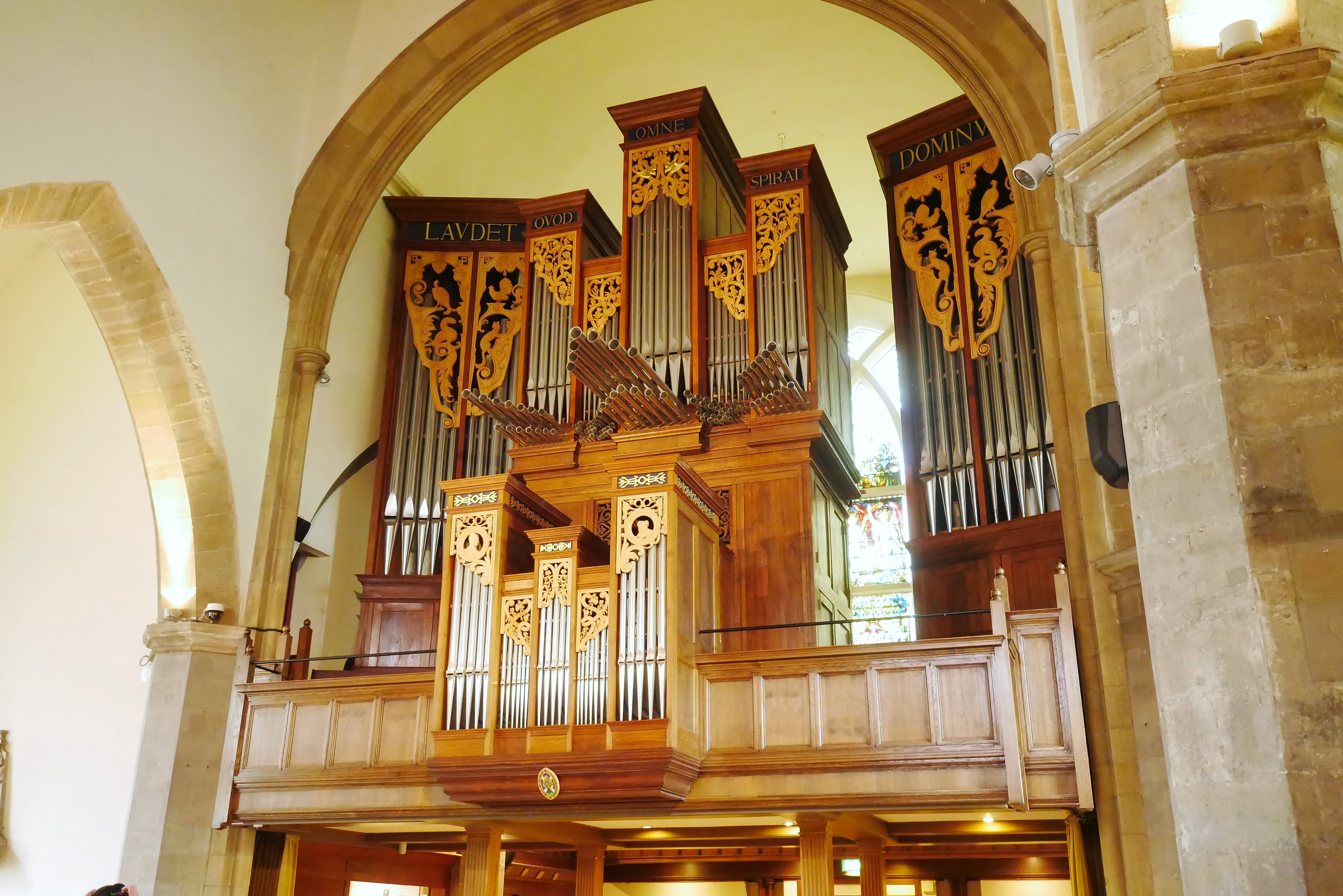
The pipe organ, built by Peter Collins and installed in 1989

The current three-manual organ stands at the west end of the church and was built by Peter Collins of Melton Mowbray in 1989. The organ possesses almost 3,400 pipes, which are arranged in towering cases with trumpets en chamade. Carved details on the cases by Derek Riley show Scottish plants and animals, a Franciscan Friar, and Greyfriars Bobby. Along the frieze of the towers runs the penultimate phrase of Psalm 150: "Laudate Dominum onme quod spirat" ("Let everything that hath breath praise the Lord"). A chamber organ stands in the north aisle: this was built around 1845 by David Hamilton of Edinburgh and purchased in 1968.

The first organ in Greyfriars was a harmonium installed against the west wall of Old Greyfriars in 1863, during the ministry of Robert Lee. This was the first successful attempt to introduce an organ in a Church of Scotland building. The harmonium was replaced in 1865 with a two-manual pipe organ by D. & T. Hamilton of Edinburgh. This was rebuilt and enlarged to three manuals in 1883 by Brindley & Foster of Sheffield. In 1932, after the union of Old and New Greyfriars, the organ was donated to St Columba's Church, Blackhall.

In 1899, D. & T. Hamilton of Edinburgh installed a three-manual organ against the east wall of New Greyfriars. This had originally been made in 1866 by the same firm for Park Parish Church, Glasgow. It was overhauled in 1901 by Charles and Frederick Hamilton of Edinburgh. When the dividing wall between Old and New Greyfriars was removed in 1938, this organ was rebuilt in the north-west gallery by Gray & Davison of London. The console was placed at ground level under the opposite arcade until it was moved to the east end during the 1950s. It was overhauled again in 1960 by H. Hilsdon of Glasgow and scrapped in 1990 after its replacement by the current organ.

=== Memorials ===
Margaret, Lady Yester, benefactor of Lady Yester's Kirk, is commemorated by a 17th-century plaque on the south wall; this was removed from Lady Yester's Kirk after its union with Greyfriars in 1938. Next to this stands Lady Yester's headstone, which was discovered in 1951 during excavations in Tweeddale Court off the High Street.

John Hutchison is responsible for the marble memorial to Robert Lee on the north wall (1870): this includes a relief portrait of Lee. Hutchison also executed a memorial plaque to William Robertson (1883). On the south wall, a stone tablet commemorates Robert Adam: this was installed in 1992 and was made to one of Adam's designs. Other individuals commemorated by plaques in Greyfriars include Thomas Ruddiman, Robert Wallace, and Alexander Nisbet, and Walter Scott.

=== Furnishings ===
The dais and oak wainscot and communion table at the east end of the church were added in 1912 to designs of Herbert Honeyman. The table is decorated with bronze panels that show the symbols of the four Evangelists and an Evangelist at work. The wainscot, whose Canopy incorporates depictions of the wounds of Christ, was adorned by the addition of gilt cross to the central panel in 1963: this was donated by City of Edinburgh (Fortress) Royal Engineers. The communion table and wainscot were altered in 1971 by George Hay.

Herbert Honeyman designed the Jacobean-style canopied pulpit: its back panel bears the arms of Scotland, Edinburgh, and the University of Edinburgh. In 1951, George Hay altered the pulpit and moved it from the first pillar on the south side to the third: this places it in the same position as the first pulpit of the church. The church also possesses brass and oak eagle lecterns; the latter dates to 1893 and came from Lady Yester's Kirk.

The font was brought from Rome in 1912 by William Moir Bryce; it likely dates from the early Renaissance. The communion table of the New North Church stands at the east end of the north aisle while the communion table of New Greyfriars stands at the east end of the south aisle. The furnishings in the western part of the south aisle were moved from the St John's Chapel of Highland, Tolbooth, St John's. Pitch pine pews added to the nave during Henry F. Kerr's restoration of 1932–1938 were replaced by chairs in 1989.

=== Bells, plate, and artefacts ===
The bell of Greyfriars hangs in a bracketed wooden shelter on the exterior of the north porch. The bell was made in the 1860s for St Paul's Church, Waterhouses, County Durham and donated to Greyfriars in 1991 by Nancy Bryson. From 1640, the bell of the Magdalen Chapel tolled to announce services at Greyfriars. The first bell of Greyfriars was installed taken from the Tron Kirk in 1684 and installed in the west tower. This was removed in 1690 and replaced by a bell made in 1691 by Edinburgh's Meikle family of founders. This bell was destroyed along with the west tower in the explosion of 1718.

Plate in possession Greyfriars includes four communion cups, two dated 1633 and two dated 1644, as well as four cups donated to Lady Yester's Kirk by the minister, Thomas Wilkie, in 1708 and, from Old Greyfriars, a laver and baptismal basin, made 1649 and renewed 1707. Embossed pewter alms dishes of 1703 and 1711 also came from Lady Yester's; the church possesses another pewter alms dish of 1733 from Greyfriars along with pewter plates and flagons. The church possess two silver cups dated 1642 and two dated 1643 as well as cups dated 1775 from the Highland congregation and plates of 1717 from the Tolbooth Kirk.

Historic items on display in Greyfriars include an original copy of the National Covenant, Robert Traill's sword, and an 1867 portrait of Greyfriars Bobby by John Macleod. A U.S. flag hangs in the north aisle: this was given by the Consul General of the United States of America in 1970 to commemorate the 350th anniversaries of both the landing of the Pilgrims at Plymouth Rock and the opening of Greyfriars.

== Ministry ==
=== Ministers and elders ===
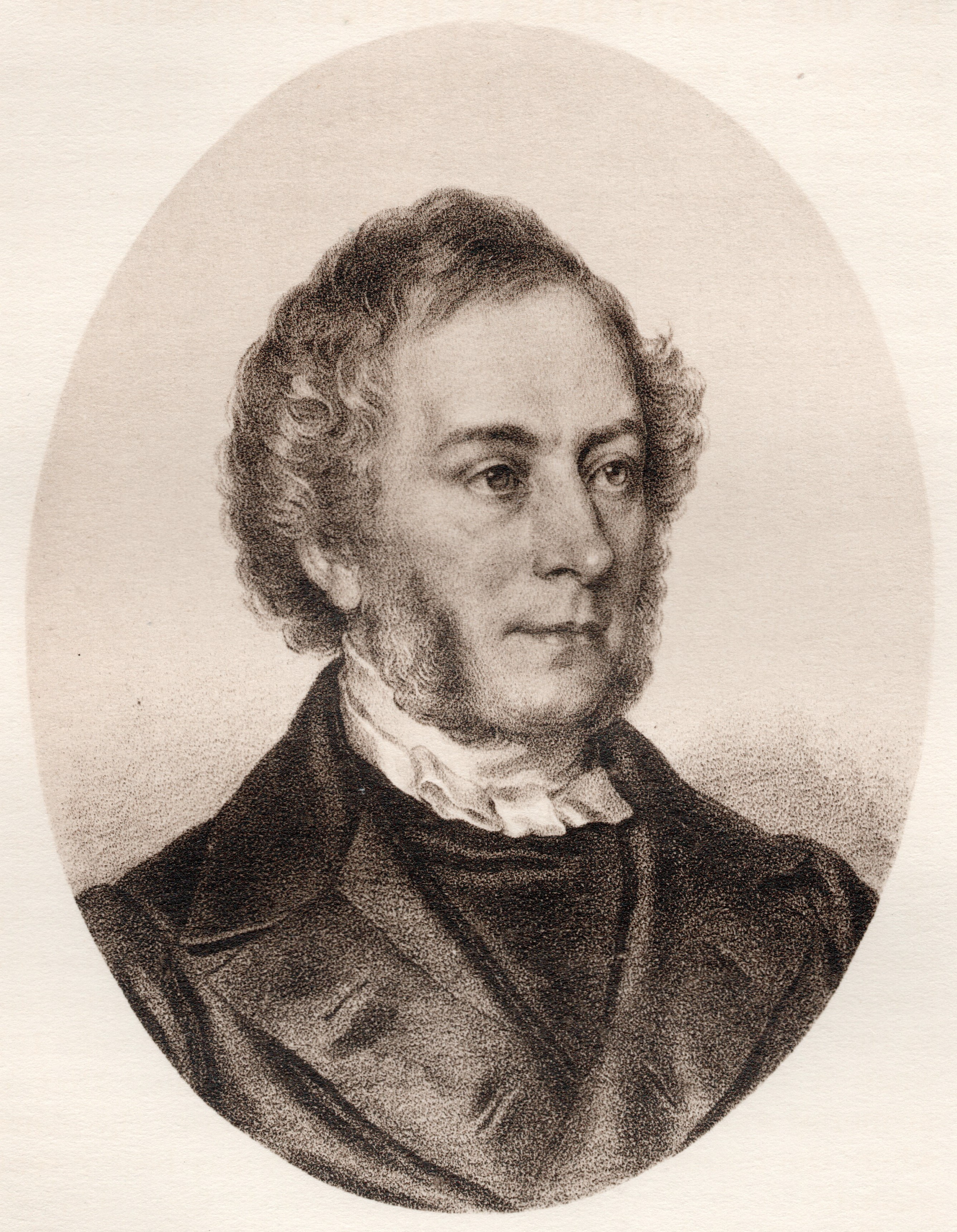
Robert Lee, who pioneered a number of liturgical reforms while minister of Old Greyfriars.

Richard Frazer has been minister of Greyfriars since 2003. He was ordained as a minister in 1986 and previously served as minister of St Machar's Cathedral, Old Aberdeen.

Both Old and New Greyfriars were burgh churches: this meant the town council held the right to nominate the churches' ministers until the abolition of patronage within the Church of Scotland in 1874. The first ministers of the South-West Parish, which became Old Greyfriars, were Robert Rollock and Peter Hewat. The charge of Greyfriars continued with two ministers until 1840, when St John's Church, Victoria Street, was erected and the last minister of the second charge, Thomas Guthrie became the first minister of the new church. New Greyfriars was, from its establishment in 1722, served by one minister. The town council often appointed promising ministers to New Greyfriars on the understanding that they would be promoted to one of the city's two-charge churches soon afterwards. For this reason, many ministers of New Greyfriars served relatively short incumbencies. In 1929, William Wallace Dunlop Gardiner, the last minister of New Greyfriars, became the first minister of the united charge of Greyfriars.

Three ministers of Old Greyfriars were elected moderator of the General Assembly of the Church of Scotland during their incumbencies: George Kay in 1755, William Robertson in 1763, John Inglis in 1804. Two ministers of New Greyfriars were elected to this role during their incumbencies: Robert Henry in 1774 and James Nicoll Ogilvie in 1918. In 2003, Alison Elliot, an elder of Greyfriars, was elected to serve as moderator of the 2004 General Assembly. Elliot was the first woman moderator and the first lay person to hold the office since George Buchanan in 1567. Other notable ministers of Greyfriars include the Covenanters, Robert Douglas, Robert Traill, and Gilbert Rule; the statesman, William Carstares; the philanthropist, Thomas Guthrie; and the liturgical reformer, Robert Lee.

=== Mission ===
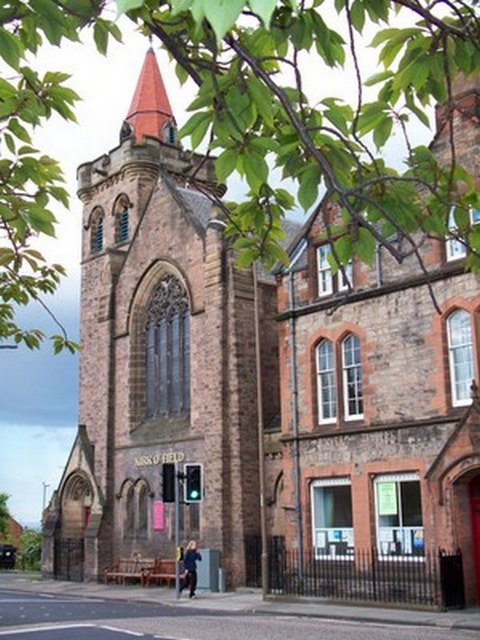
Since 2016, the congregation has operated the Greyfriars Charteris Centre in the former Kirk o' Field Parish Church.

Since the 18th century, the congregations of Greyfriars have maintained missions, church centres, and projects outwith the main church building. New Greyfriars was especially active in mission work, using the Gaelic Chapel in Castle Wynd and, in 1846, founding the Vennel Ragged School: one of the first of its kind in Edinburgh. In 1886, the congregation built the Robertson Memorial Mission in the Grassmarket. From 1835, Old Greyfriars rented the Magdalen Chapel as a preaching station to the poor of the Cowgate.

Since 1982, the congregation has worked with the Grassmarket Mission. Together, they have developed the Grassmarket Community Project, which offers community and training to homeless people and individuals with physical and mental health needs. Since 2016, Greyfriars Kirk has operated the Greyfriars Charteris Centre in the former buildings of Kirk o' Field Parish Church and the St Ninian's Centre on the Pleasance. The centre, named for Archibald Charteris, offers halls for the use of the local community.

In 2002, Greyfriars Kirk, Augustine United Church (United Reformed), and St Columba's-by-the-Castle (Episcopal) committed "to work together to establish a united and positive Christian presence in the centre of Edinburgh". In 2006, this grouping was recognised as a Local Ecumenical Partnership by the Scottish Churches National Sponsoring Body. The congregations engage in joint services during Holy Week; the congregations are also members of Action of Churches Together in Scotland and Edinburgh Churches Together.

The minister of Greyfriars is a member of the chaplaincy team of the University of Edinburgh. The church also hosts services and events in co-operation with the university chaplaincy.

=== Worship and choir ===
Greyfriars' main weekly services takes place at 11 a.m. every Sunday. Communion is held monthly and a prayer service is held every Thursday at 1.10 p.m.

Greyfriars played a leading role in the development of liturgy in the Church of Scotland: during the ministry of Robert Lee in Old Greyfriars, practices such as standing for praise, the use of prepared prayers, kneeling for prayer, and the playing of a harmonium to accompany praise. Lee's innovations led to the foundation of the Church Service Society, whose library is kept in Greyfriars.

Greyfriars' mixed, non-professional choir sings at the 11 a.m. Sunday services and at special services throughout the year. The choir is led by choirmaster and organist, Henry Wallace. The tradition of choral music at Greyfriars began in 1865, when Joseph Geoghegan, musical director between 1857 and 1883, founded Greyfriars Choral Society.

==== Gaelic worship ====
A Gaelic language service is held every Sunday in Greyfriars at 12.30 p.m. in the St John's Aisle. Since the death of the Reverend Ewen Maclean in 2000, an ecumenical roster of ministers and preachers have led services; worship also features the unaccompanied singing of the Psalms. The church also hosts the annual Highland lecture on Gaelic subjects and, during the General Assembly, a Gaelic service.

Gaelic services have been held in Greyfriars since 1979, when the congregation united with Highland, Tolbooth, St John's. Gaelic worship in Edinburgh began in 1704, when the General Assembly made provision for Gaelic-speaking soldiers stationed in Edinburgh Castle. The first Gaelic chapel opened on Castle Wynd in 1769; the congregation united with its own chapel of ease in Horse Wynd (now Chambers Street) in 1815 and became a parish quoad sacra in 1834. In 1875, the congregation, by then known as St Oran's, moved to the former Catholic Apostolic Church in Broughton. The congregation moved again in 1948, when it united with St Columba's – which had been founded as a congregation of the Free Church in 1843 – based on Cambridge Street in Tollcross. In 1956, the congregation united with Tolbooth St John's.

== See also ==
- Church of Scotland
- Covenanters
- Greyfriars Kirkyard
- List of Church of Scotland parishes
- Robert Lee

== Sources ==
=== Bibliography ===
- Bryce, William Moir (1912). History of the Old Greyfriars' Church Edinburgh. Edinburgh: William Green and Sons.
  - Fleming, D. Hay
    - "The Subscribing of the National Covenant in 1638"
- Drummond, Andrew Landale (1934). The Church Architecture of Protestantism. T. & T. Clark
- Dunlop, A. Ian (1988). The Kirks of Edinburgh: 1560-1984. Scottish Record Society. ISBN 0-902054-10-4
- Forrester, Duncan and Murray, Douglas (1984). Studies in the History of Worship in Scotland (Second edition). T&T Clark Ltd ISBN 0-567-08504-X
  - Murray, Douglas
    - "Chapter Six: Disruption to Union"
- Gifford, John; McWilliam, Colin; Walker, David (1984). The Buildings of Scotland: Edinburgh. Penguin Books. ISBN 0-14-071068-X
- Gray, William Forbes (1940). Historic Edinburgh Churches. The Moray Press.
- Hay, George (1957). The Architecture of Scottish Post-Reformation Churches: 1560 to 1843. Oxford University Press.
- Maxwell, William D. (1955). A History of Worship in the Church of Scotland. Oxford University Press.
- Steele, Alan (1993). The Kirk of the Greyfriars, Edinburgh. Society of Friends of the Kirk of the Greyfriars. ISBN 0-9521115-0-0
- Scott, Hew (1915). Fasti ecclesiae scoticanae; the succession of ministers in the Church of Scotland from the reformation. Vol. 1. Edinburgh: Oliver and Boyd. pp. 37–48.
- Royal Commission on the Ancient and Historical Monuments of Scotland (1951). An Inventory of the Ancient and Historical Monuments of the City of Edinburgh with the Thirteenth Report of the Commission. His Majesty's Stationery Office.

=== Online databases ===
- Historic Environment Scotland. "Edinburgh, Franciscan Friary (Site no. NT27SE 22)".
- Historic Environment Scotland. "Edinburgh, 4 Grassmarket, Robertson Memorial Mission Church (Site no. NT27SE 676)".
- Historic Environment Scotland. "GREYFRIARS PLACE, GREYFRIARS CHURCH (CHURCH OF SCOTLAND) (LB27018)".
- National Pipe Organ Register (NPOR)
  - "Midlothian Edinburgh, Greyfriars Tolbooth & Highland Kirk, (pre-1979 Greyfriars Kirk), 86 Candlemaker Row [N09208]". National Pipe Organ Register. British Institute of Organ Studies.
  - "Midlothian Edinburgh, Greyfriars Tolbooth & Highland Kirk, (pre-1979 Greyfriars Kirk), 86 Candlemaker Row [D06991]". National Pipe Organ Register. British Institute of Organ Studies.
  - "Midlothian Edinburgh, Greyfriars Tolbooth & Highland Kirk, (pre-1979 Greyfriars Kirk), 86 Candlemaker Row [E01340]". National Pipe Organ Register. British Institute of Organ Studies.
  - "Midlothian Edinburgh, Greyfriars Tolbooth & Highland Kirk, (pre-1979 Greyfriars Kirk), 86 Candlemaker Row [N11948]". National Pipe Organ Register. British Institute of Organ Studies.
