= List of Church of Scotland parishes =

What follows is a list of Church of Scotland parishes (separate pages exist for places of worship and charges/ministers). A complete list of parishes with statistical data will be found in the Church of Scotland Yearbook (known as the Red Book). The Church of Scotland, the national church of Scotland, divides the country into regional bodies called presbyteries, which in turn are subdivided into parishes, each served by a parish church, usually with its own minister. Unions and readjustments may however result in a parish having more than one building, or several parishes sharing a minister (these are known as "linked charges"). The Church of Scotland has presbyteries outwith Scotland: these presbyteries have "gathered congregations" rather than parishes.

== Abbreviations ==
- C = Presbytery of Clyde
- CEI = Presbytery of Cleir Eilean I
- E = Presbytery of England
- EWL = Presbytery of Edinburgh and West Lothian
- F = Presbytery of Fife
- FVC = Presbytery of Forth Valley and Clydesdale
- G = Presbytery of Glasgow
- I = International Presbytery
- L = Presbytery of Lewis
- LB = Presbytery of Lothian and Borders
- NENI = Presbytery of the North East and Northern Isles
- P = Presbytery of Perth
- SW = Presbytery of the South West

== Presbytery of Edinburgh and West Lothian ==
Formed on 1 January 2022 from a merger of the Presbytery of Edinburgh and the Presbytery of West Lothian.

Parish	Pres.	Ppn	Created	Civil parishes	Places of worship
Abercorn, Pardovan, Kingscavil & Winchburgh	EWL	6,324	2024	Abercorn; Ecclesmachan (part); Linlithgow (part)	1) Kingscavil; 2) Winchburgh
Aberlady and Gullane	LB	4,617		Aberlady; Dirleton (part)	1) Aberlady; 2) Gullane
Ale and Teviot	LB	1,750		Ancrum; Crailing; Eckford; Lilliesleaf	1) Ancrum; 2) Crailing; 3) Lilliesleaf
Armadale	EWL	12,590	1929	Bathgate (part); Torphichen (part)	Armadale
Ayton and District	LB	2,797		Ayton; Foulden; Mordington; Coldingham (part)	1) Ayton; 2) Foulden; 3) Reston
Bathgate	EWL	18,204		Bathgate	Bathgate
Bathgate: Boghall	EWL	4,231	1974	Bathgate (part)	Boghall
Belhaven and Spott	LB	2,839		Spott; Dunbar (part)	1) Belhaven; 2) Spott
Berwick-upon-Tweed: St Andrew's Wallace; Green and Lowick	LB	N/A	1988	N/A	Berwick-upon-Tweed
Blackridge	EWL	2,215	1929	Torphichen (part); Shotts (part)	Blackridge
Bonnyrigg	LB	4,107	1929	Cockpen (part); Lasswade (part)	Bonnyrigg
Bowden and Melrose	LB	7,937		Bowden; Melrose	1) Bowden; 2) Melrose
Broxburn and Uphall	EWL	13,202	2025	Ecclesmachan; Uphall	1) Broxburn; 2) St Nicholas, Uphall
Caddonfoot	LB	1,111	1867	Caddonfoot	Caddonfoot
Carlingwark	SW	6,903	2025	Buittle; Kelton; Kirkpatrick Durham; Rerrick; Parton (part)	1) Auchencairn; 2) Castle Douglas; 3) Kirkpatrick Durham
Carlops	LB	383	1929	West Linton (part); Penicuik (part)	Carlops
Cavers and Kirkton	LB	538	1976	Cavers	Cavers
Channelkirk and Lauder	LB	2,839		Channelkirk; Lauder	1) Channelkirk; 2) Lauder
Cheviot	LB	1,497		Hownam; Linton; Morebattle; Yetholm	1) Morebattle; 2) Kirk Yetholm
Cockenzie and Port Seton	LB	5,385		Prestonpans (part)	Cockenzie & Port Set.
Cockpen and Carrington	LB	10,019	1975	Cockpen; Carrington	Cockpen Kirk
Coldingham and St Abbs	LB	1,019		Coldingham	Coldingham Priory
Coldstream and District	LB	2,992		Coldstream; Ladykirk; Swinton	Coldstream
Colvend, Southwick & Kirkbean	SW	1,362	1978	Colvend & Southwick; Kirkbean	1) Colvend; 2) Southwick
Dalbeattie and Kirkgunzeon	SW	4,327		Kirkgunzeon; Urr (part)	Dalbeattie
Dalkeith: St John's and Newton	LB	7,731		Newton; Dalkeith (part); Newbattle (part)	St John's Dalkeith
Dirleton	LB	1,591	Ancient	Dirleton	Dirleton Kirk
Dryburgh District	LB	3,615		Maxton; Mertoun; St Boswells; Melrose (part)	1) Maxton; 2) Mertoun; 3) Newtown St Bosw. 4) St Boswells
Dumfries: Maxwelltown West and New Abbey	SW	6,285	2025	New Abbey; Troqueer (part)	1) Maxwelltown West; 2) New Abbey
Dumfries: Northwest	SW	7,565		Holywood; Terregles (part)	Dumfries Northwest
Dumfries: Troqueer and Caerlaverock	SW	8,629	2025	Caerlaverock; Troqueer	1) Troqueer; 2) Caerlaverock
Dunbar	LB	9,065	1966	Dunbar	Dunbar
Dunglass	LB	1,376	1994	Cockburnspath; Innerwick; Oldhamstocks	Cockburnspath
Duns and District	LB	5,113		Abbey St Bathans; Bunkle & Preston; Cranshaws; Duns; Edrom; Langton; Longformacus; Polwarth	1) Bonkyl; 2) Cranshaws; 3) Duns; 4) Edrom; 5) Gavinton
Dunscore	SW	826	1940	Dunscore	Dunscore
Earlston	LB	2,118		Earlston	Earlston
East Calder, Kirknewton and Ratho	EWL	13,204		Kirknewton; Ratho	1) East Calder; 2) Ratho
Eccles and Leitholm	LB	791		Eccles	Leitholm
Eddleston	LB	638		Eddleston	Eddleston
Edinburgh: Balerno	EWL	6,651	1929	Currie (part)	Balerno
Edinburgh: Barclay Viewforth	EWL	12,775		Edinburgh (part)	Barclay Viewforth
Edinburgh: Blackford and Grange	EWL	8,259	2026	Edinburgh (part)	1) Marchmont St Giles; 2) Reid Memorial
Edinburgh: Blackhall St Columba's	EWL	6,154	1922	Edinburgh (part)	Blackhall St Columba's
Edinburgh: Broughton St Mary's	EWL	11,882	1992	Edinburgh (part)	Broughton St Mary's
Edinburgh: Canongate	EWL	3,344	Ancient	Edinburgh (part)	Canongate Kirk
Edinburgh: Corstorphine Old and New	EWL	17,403	2026	Edinburgh (part)	1) Corstorphine Old Kirk; 2) Craigsbank
Edinburgh: Corstorphine St Anne's	EWL	4,596	1915	Edinburgh (part)	Corstorphine St Anne's
Edinburgh: Corstorphine St Ninian's	EWL	4,368	1929	Edinburgh (part)	Corstorph. St Ninian's
Edinburgh: Craiglockhart	EWL	4,402	1897	Edinburgh (part)	Craiglockhart
Edinburgh: Currie	EWL	8,116	Ancient	Currie	Currie
Edinburgh: Dalmeny and Queensferry	EWL	10,443		Dalmeny	1) Dalmeny; 2) Queensferry
Edinburgh: Davidson's Mains	EWL	6,718	1929	Edinburgh (part)	Davidson's Mains
Edinburgh: Duddingston Richmond Craigmillar	EWL	18,535	2026	Edinburgh (part)	1) Duddingston Kirk; 2) Richmond Craigmillar
Edinburgh: Drylaw	EWL	5,620	1952	Edinburgh (part)	Drylaw
Edinburgh: Fairmilehead	EWL	7,529	1938	Edinburgh (part)	Fairmilehead
Edinburgh: Gorgie and Palmerston Place	EWL	24,170		Edinburgh (part)	1) Gorgie; 2) Palmerston Place
Edinburgh: Granton	EWL	12,738	1889	Edinburgh (part)	Granton
Edinburgh: Greenbank	EWL	4,266	1929	Edinburgh (part)	Greenbank
Edinburgh: Greyfriars St Cuthbert's	EWL	18,849	2026	Edinburgh (part)	1) Greyfriars Kirk; 2) St Cuthbert's
Edinburgh: High (St Giles')	EWL	2,167	Ancient	Edinburgh	St Giles' Cathedral
Edinburgh: Holy Trinity	EWL	8,116	1959	Edinburgh (part)	Wester Hailes
Edinburgh: Inverleith St Serf's	EWL	7,713		Edinburgh (part)	Inverleith
Edinburgh: Kirkliston	EWL	6,256	1941	Kirkliston	Kirkliston
Edinburgh: Leith and Restalrig	EWL	28,120	2025	Edinburgh (part)	1) Leith Walk; 2) Restalrig
Edinburgh: Leith North and South	EWL	21,828		Edinburgh (part)	South Leith
Edinburgh: Meadowbank and Willowbrae	EWL	20,560	2023	Edinburgh (part)	Meadowbank
Edinburgh: Morningside	EWL	11,166		Edinburgh (part)	Morningside
Edinburgh: Morningside United (CoS/URC)	EWL	3,423	1980	Edinburgh (part)	Morningside United
Edinburgh: Murrayfield	EWL	6,816	1913	Edinburgh (part)	Murrayfield
Edinburgh: New Town	EWL	6,979	2024	Edinburgh (part)	New Town
Edinburgh: Newhaven	EWL	5,894	1974	Edinburgh (part)	Newhaven
Edinburgh: Newington Trinity	EWL	16,457	2025	Edinburgh (part)	Newington Trinity
Edinburgh: Northwest	EWL	20,653		Edinburgh (part)	1) Cramond; 2) Pennywell
Edinburgh: Pentlands	EWL	12,688		Edinburgh (part)	1) Colinton; 2) Juniper Green
Edinburgh: Polwarth	EWL	8,108	1981	Edinburgh (part)	Polwarth
Edinburgh: Portobello and Joppa	EWL	13,604		Edinburgh (part)	Portobello & Joppa
Edinburgh: St Andrew's Clermiston	EWL	6,781	1955	Edinburgh (part)	St Andrew's Clermiston
Edinburgh: St Catherine's Argyle	EWL	5,126	1968	Edinburgh (part)	St Catherine's Argyle
Edinburgh: St David's Carrick Knowe	EWL	13,311		Edinburgh (part)	Carrick Knowe
Edinburgh: St John's Colinton Mains	EWL	8,873		Edinburgh (part)	Colinton Mains
Edinburgh: St Martin's	EWL	4,479	1967	Edinburgh (part)	St Martin's
Edinburgh: St Michael's	EWL	7,558	1887	Edinburgh (part)	St Michael's
Edinburgh: St Nicholas' Sighthill	EWL	6,279	1939	Edinburgh (part)	St Nicholas Sighthill
Edinburgh: St Stephen's Comely Bank	EWL	7,845	1929	Edinburgh (part)	Comely Bank
Edinburgh: Slateford Longstone	EWL	4,258	1955	Edinburgh (part)	Slateford Longstone
Edinburgh: South East	EWL	38,405		Edinburgh (part)	1) Gilmerton; 2) Liberton; 3) Liberton Northfield; 4) Moredun
Edinburgh: Stockbridge	EWL	8,206	1992	Edinburgh (part)	Stockbridge
Edinburgh: Wardie	EWL	1,616	1929	Edinburgh (part)	Wardie
Ervie Kirkcolm	SW	669	1950	Kirkcolm	Kirkcolm
Ettrick and Yarrow	LB	578		Ettrick; Kirkhope; Yarrow	1) Ettrick; 2) Kirkhope; 3) Yarrow
Eyemouth	LB	3,698		Eyemouth; Ayton (part)	Eyemouth
Fauldhouse and Harthill: St Andrew's	EWL	8,333		Shotts (part); Whitburn (part); West Calder (part)	1) Fauldhouse; 2) Harthill
Fogo	LB	167		Fogo	Fogo
Galashiels	LB	12,665		Galashiels	Galashiels
Galloway Dee	SW	1,587		Balmaghie; Crossmichael; Parton	1) Parton; 2) Crossmichael (hall)
Gatehouse and Borgue	SW	1,931		Anwoth; Borgue; Girthon	Gatehouse of Fleet
Gladsmuir	LB	1,917		Gladsmuir	Gladsmuir
Glasserton, Isle of Whithorn & Whithorn St Ninian's Priory	SW	1,643		Glasserton; Whithorn	1) Isle of Whithorn; 2) Whithorn
Glencairn and Moniaive	SW	890	1957	Glencairn	Moniaive
Glenkens	SW	1,851		Balmaclellan; Carsphairn; Dalry; Kells	1) Balmaclellan; 2) Carsphairn; 3) Dalry; 4) Kells
Gordon: St Michael's	LB	1,101		Gordon; Westruther	Gordon
Gorebridge	LB	7,779		Temple; Borthwick (part); Newbattle (part); Cockpen (part)	Gorebridge
Greenlaw	LB	709		Greenlaw	Greenlaw
Haddington St Mary's	LB	11,856		Haddington	1) Haddington St Mary's; 2) Haddington West
Hawick: Burnfoot	LB	2,727		Hawick (part)	Burnfoot
Hawick: South	LB	7,929		Hawick; Roberton	Hawick South
Hawick: Wilton	LB	3,523		Hawick (part)	Wilton
Innerleithen, Traquair and Walkerburn	LB	5,256		Innerleithen; Traquair	1) Innerleithen; 2) Traquair
Irongray, Lochrutton & Terregles	SW	2,375		Kirkpatrick Irongray; Lochrutton; Terregles	1) Irongray; 2) Terregles
Jedburgh and Oxnam	LB	5,085		Jedburgh; Oxnam	1) Jedburgh; 2) Oxnam
Kelso: North and Country	LB	7,615		Kelso (part); Ednam; Hume; Makerstoun; Nenthorn; Roxburgh; Smailholm; Stichill	1) Kelso North; 2) Stichill
Kelso: Old and Sprouston	LB	1,855		Kelso; Sprouston	1) Kelso Old; 2) Sprouston
Kirk of Calder	EWL	5,018	1956	Mid Calder	Kirk of Calder
Kirkconnel	SW	2,361	1983	Kirkconnel	Kirkconnel
Kirkcowan	SW	758	1954	Kirkcowan	Kirkcowan
Kirkcudbright	SW	3,203	1983	Kirkcudbright	Kirkcudbright
Kirkmabreck l/w Monigaff	SW	980		Kirkmabreck	Creetown
Kirkmabreck l/w Monigaff	SW	1,731	Ancient	Minnigaff	none
Kirkmaiden	SW	680		Kirkmaiden	Drummore
Kirkurd and Newlands	LB	915		Kirkurd; Newlands	Newlands
Lammermuir	LB	2,643		Bolton; Garvald & Bara; Humbie; Morham; Saltoun; Yester	1) Humbie; 2) Saltoun; 3) Yester
Lasswade and Rosewell	LB	6,510		Lasswade	1) Lasswade; 2) Rosewell
Legerwood	LB	307		Legerwood	Legerwood
Leswalt	SW	709		Leswalt	Leswalt
Linlithgow and Avon Valley	EWL	15,790		Linlithgow; Torphichen; Muiravonside (part); Slamannan (part)	1) Avonbridge; 2) Linlithgow; 3) St Nin's Craigmailen; 4) Torphichen
Livingston: Old	EWL	15,604		Livingston; Bathgate (part); Mid Calder (part)	1) Livingston Old; 2) Deans
Livingston United (CoS/SEC/Meth/URC)	EWL	37,626	1998	Mid Calder (part); Livingston (part); Uphall (part)	Livingston United
Loanhead and Bilston	LB	9,677		Lasswade (part)	1) Bilston; 2) Loanhead
Longniddry	LB	2,631		Gladsmuir (part)	Longniddry
Luce Valley and Inch	SW	2,564		Inch; New Luce; Old Luce	1) Glenluce; 2) Inch
Lyne and Manor	LB	200		Lyne; Manor	1) Lyne; 2) Kirkton Manor
Millisle	SW	1,151		Kirkinner; Sorbie	Garlieston
Mochrum	SW	1,169	Ancient	Mochrum	Mochrum
Musselburgh: Northesk	LB	11,863		Inveresk (part)	Northesk
Musselburgh: St Andrew's High	LB	10,240		Inveresk (part)	St Andrew's High
Musselburgh: St Michael's Inveresk	LB	6,309		Inveresk	St Michael's Inveresk
Newbattle: St Nicholas Buccleuch	LB	26,668		Dalkeith; Newbattle	1) Easthouses; 2) Newtongrange
North Berwick: Abbey	LB	4,286		North Berwick	Abbey
North Berwick: St Andrew Blackadder	LB	3,766		North Berwick (part)	St Andrew Blackadder
Ormiston	LB	2,701		Ormiston	Ormiston
Penninghame	SW	3,176		Penninghame	Newton Stewart
Penpont, Keir and Tynron	SW	1,185	1980	Keir; Penpont; Tynron	Penpont
Portpatrick	SW	900		Portpatrick	Portpatrick
Sanquhar St Bride's	SW	2,299		Sanquhar	Sanquhar
Stoneykirk	SW	1,179		Stoneykirk	Sandhead
Stranraer	SW	10,852		Stranraer; Inch (part); Leswalt (part)	Stranraer
Tarff and Twynholm	SW	1,538		Tongland; Twynholm	Twynholm
Uphall South	EWL	4,249		Uphall (part); Ecclesmachan (part)	Uphall South
Urr	SW	683		Urr	Haugh of Urr
West Calder and Polbeth	EWL	6,744	2026	West Calder; Mid Calder (part)	1) Polbeth; 2) West Calder
Whitburn Burnfield Valley North	EWL	12,111		Whitburn (part); Livingston (part)	1) Blackburn; 2) Whitburn Brucefield
Whitburn Burnfield Valley South	EWL	13,184		Whitburn; West Calder (part)	1) Bents; 2) Whitburn South
Wigtown	SW	1,168		Wigtown	Wigtown

== Presbytery of Lothian and Borders ==
Formed on 1 January 2023 from the Presbyteries of Lothian; Melrose and Peebles; Duns; and Jedburgh.

Parish(es)	Population	Buildings	Founded
Ormiston l/w Pencaitland	2,221	Ormiston	MPC (1938)
Ormiston l/w Pencaitland	2,298	Pencaitland	MPC
Penicuik: North	8,493	Penicuik North	
Penicuik: Trinity	8,366	Penicuik Trinity	
Prestonpans: Prestongrange	9,272	Prestongrange (Prestonpans)	MPC (1774)
Roslin	1,901	Roslin	
Tranent	12,227	Tranent	MPC (1800)
Traprain	4,300	Athelstaneford Church; Prestonkirk Church, East Linton (medieval, rebuilt 1770); Stenton Church	
Tyne Valley	3,692	Cranstoun	
Tyne Valley	3,692	Fala	
Stow: St Mary of Wedale and Heriot	1,528	St Mary of Wedale, Stow	MPC (1876)
Stow: St Mary of Wedale and Heriot	1,528	Heriot (to close)	MPC (1875)
Selkirk and Ashkirk	6,647	Selkirk	Medieval
Upper Tweeddale l/w West Linton: St Andrew's [West Tweeddale]	956	Broughton (in village hall)	Medieval
Upper Tweeddale l/w West Linton: St Andrew's [West Tweeddale]	956	Skirling	Medieval
Upper Tweeddale l/w West Linton: St Andrew's [West Tweeddale]	956	Tweedsmuir	
Upper Tweeddale l/w West Linton: St Andrew's [West Tweeddale]	2,093	St Andrew's W. Linton	Medieval
Peebles: Old	5,042	Peebles Old	Medieval
Stobo and Drumelzier	183	Stobo	Medieval
Peebles: St Andrew's Leckie	3,712	St Andrews Leckie, Peebles	C19th (1877)
Whiteadder	2,394	Chirnside	Medieval
Whiteadder	2,394	Paxton	1908
Teviothead	146	Teviothead (services to be in hall)	
Ruberslaw Country	2,001	Hobkirk	Medieval
Ruberslaw Country	2,001	Denholm	1844

== Presbytery of the South West ==
Formed on 30 September 2022 when the presbyteries of Ardrossan; Irvine and Kilmarnock; Ayr; Wigtown and Stranraer; Annandale and Eskdale; and Dumfries and Kirkcudbright merged to become the Presbytery of the South West.

Parish(es)	Pop'n	Buildings	Founded
Annan: Old and Dornock	7,754	Annan Old	Medieval
Annan: Old and Dornock	7,754	Eastriggs (in village hall)	
Annan: St Andrew's and St Bryde's	4,804	St Andrew's, Annan	
Annan: St Andrew's and St Bryde's	4,804	Brydekirk, Annan	
Border Kirk	N/A	Border Kirk, Carlisle	
Border Kirk	N/A	Longtown (Meth/CoS)	
Canonbie United (LEP)	1,192	Canonbie	
Eskdale and Liddesdale	4,015	Langholm	1843
Eskdale and Liddesdale	4,015	Westerkirk (Bentpath)	
Eskdale and Liddesdale	4,015	Liddesdale (Newcastleton)	
Gretna Old, Gretna St Andrew's, Half Morton and Kirkpatrick Fleming	4,994	Gretna Old	Medieval
Gretna Old, Gretna St Andrew's, Half Morton and Kirkpatrick Fleming	4,994	St Andrew's, Gretna	1917
Hoddom, Kirtle-Eaglesfield and Middlebie	2,564	Middlebie	Medieval
Hoddom, Kirtle-Eaglesfield and Middlebie	2,564	Eaglesfield	
Lochmaben	3,792	Lochmaben	
Lockerbie Dryfesdale, Hutton, Corrie and Applegarth	5,843	Lockerbie (Dryfesdale) (in hall)	Medieval
Tundergarth	141	Tundergarth (locally owned)	
Upper Annandale	3,962	St Andrew's, Moffat	Medieval
Carlingwark	7,185	Auchencairn	
Carlingwark	7,185	Castle Douglas	
Carlingwark	7,185	Kirkpatrick Durham	Medieval
Kirkmahoe	2,774	Kirkmahoe	Medieval
Kirkmahoe	2,774	Dalswinton	
Colvend, Southwick and Kirkbean	1,525	Colvend	Medieval
Colvend, Southwick and Kirkbean	1,525	Southwick (Caulkerbush)	Medieval
Cummertrees, Mouswald and Ruthwell	1,299	Ruthwell	Medieval
Dumfries: St George's	3,770	St George's, Dumfries	1843
Dumfries: St Michael's and South	10,106	St Michael's, Dumfries	Ancient
Dunscore l/w Glencairn and Moniaive	826	Dunscore	
Dunscore l/w Glencairn and Moniaive	890	St Ninian's, Moniaive	1887
Mid-Nithsdale	4,531	Closeburn	Medieval
Mid-Nithsdale	4,531	Penpont	Medieval
Mid-Nithsdale	4,531	Thornhill	
Kirkcudbright	3,203	Kirkcudbright	MPC (1838)
Kirkmichael, Tinwald and Torthorwald	5,273	Kirkmichael (Parkgate)	Medieval
Kirkmichael, Tinwald and Torthorwald	5,273	Tinwald	Medieval
Kirkmichael, Tinwald and Torthorwald	5,273	Torthorwald	Medieval
Alloway and Fisherton	6,783	Alloway	
Annbank l/w Tarbolton	3,645	Annbank (Mossblown)	
Annbank l/w Tarbolton	2,210	Tarbolton	
Auchinleck l/w Catrine	4,063	Auchinleck	
Auchinleck l/w Catrine	2,236	Catrine (in village hall)	1793
Ayr: Auld Kirk of Ayr (St John the Baptist)	3,127	Ayr Auld Kirk	MPC (1654)
Ayr: Castlehill	9,146	Ayr Castlehill	
Ayr: North Ayr Parish Church	15,509	Newton Wallacetown (Lochside?)	
Ayr: St Andrew's	3,397	St Andrew's, Ayr (in hall)	
Ayr: St Columba	6,357	St.Columba's	
Ayr: St Leonard's	2,804	St Leonard's, Ayr	1886
Ayrshire: Kyle Community	8,632	Coylton	
Ayrshire: Kyle Community	8,632	Schaw Kirk, Drongan	
Ayrshire: Kyle Community	8,632	Ochiltree	Medieval
Dalrymple	1,917	Dalrymple	
Ballantrae and St Colmon	1,588	Ballantrae	
Ballantrae and St Colmon	1,588	St Colmon's, Colmonell	
Craigie, Dundonald and Symington	5,747	Symington	Medieval
Craigie, Dundonald and Symington	5,747	Dundonald	
Dalmellington	3,170	Bellsbank	
Patna: Waterside	2,284	Waterside, Patna	
Girvan Valley	8,480	Barr (LMC)	
Girvan Valley	8,480	Dailly (LMC)	1766
Girvan Valley	8,480	St Cuthbert's, Girvan	MPC (1884)
Kirkmichael	815	Kirkmichael	
Straiton: St Cuthbert's	320	St Cuthbert's, Straiton	
South East Ayrshire Parish Church	15,909	Lugar	
South East Ayrshire Parish Church	15,909	Muirkirk	
South East Ayrshire Parish Church	15,909	New Cumnock	
South East Ayrshire Parish Church	15,909	Old Cumnock: Old	
Mauchline l/w Sorn	4,529	St Michael's, Mauchline	MPC (1829)
Mauchline l/w Sorn	770	Sorn	
Monkton and Prestwick Trinity	8,681	Prestwick North	1843
Monkton and Prestwick Trinity	8,681	Prestwick South	1882
North Carrick	7,431	Kirkoswald	Medieval
North Carrick	7,431	Crosshill	
North Carrick	7,431	Maybole	
Stair	314	Stair	1706
Prestwick: Kingcase	5,043	Kingcase	1912 (1934)
Prestwick: St Nicholas	3,615	St Nicholas, Prestwick	1908
Troon	15,396	Portland, Troon	
Troon	15,396	St Meddan's, Troon	1889
Caldwell and Dunlop	2,285	Caldwell (Uplawmoor)	1889
Caldwell and Dunlop	2,285	Dunlop	
Crosshouse	3,528	Crosshouse	
Fenwick	1,655	Fenwick	1643
Hurlford	5,840	Hurlford	
Irvine: Old	4,920	Irvine Old	
Irvine United	34,470	Fullarton, Irvine	
Irvine United	34,470	Dreghorn	
Irvine United	34,470	Girdle Toll, Irvine	1990
Irvine United	34,470	Mure Relief, Irvine	
Irvine Valley	12,436	Darvel	1888
Irvine Valley	12,436	Galston	Medieval
Irvine Valley	12,436	Newmilns (in hall)	Medieval
Kilmarnock: Kay Park	6,009	Kay Park, Kilmarnock	1732 (1907)
Kilmarnock: New Laigh	16,707	New Laigh, Kilmarnock	pre-1732
Kilmarnock: St Kentigern	5,439	St Kentigern's, Kilmarnock	1969
Kilmarnock: St Marnock's	18,222	St Marnock's, Kilmarnock	1836
Ayrshire Mission to the Deaf	18,222	St Marnock's, Kilmarnock	
Kilmaurs: St Maur's Glencairn	3,041	St Maur's Glencairn, Kilmaurs	Medieval
Stewarton: John Knox	2,951	John Knox, Stewarton	
Stewarton: St Columba's	4,864	St Columba's, Stewarton	
Ardrossan and Saltcoats: Kirkgate	17,070	Saltcoats Kirkgate	C17th
Ardrossan	6,768	Ardrossan	1857 (1959)
Beith	7,369	Beith	Medieval
Cumbrae, Fairlie and Largs	14,367	Clark Memorial, Largs	1783
Cumbrae, Fairlie and Largs	14,367	Fairlie	1834
Cumbrae, Fairlie and Largs	14,367	Cumbrae (Millport)	Medieval
Dalry: St Margaret's	6,252	Trinity, Dalry	
Isle of Arran	4,660	St Bride's, Brodick	1910
Isle of Arran	4,660	St Bride's, Lochranza	Medieval
Isle of Arran	4,660	St Molios, Shiskine	1886
Isle of Arran	4,660	Whiting Bay	
Kilbirnie: New	7,730	Kilbirnie New	1843
Kilwinning	17,208	Kilwinning Abbey	1590 (1774)
Kilwinning	17,208	Mansefield Trinity, Kilwinning	
Stevenston	9,418	Stevenston	
West Kilbride	5,233	West Kilbride	Medieval

== Presbytery of Clyde ==
Parish(es)	Population	Buildings	Founded
Barrhead: Bourock	9,296	Bourock, Barrhead	
Barrhead: St Andrew's	8,894	St Andrew's, Barrhead	1793
Bishopton	5,239	Bishopton	Medieval(1815)
Bridge of Weir	5,141	Bridge of Weir	1737
Elderslie and Linwood	14,728	Elderslie	1840
Erskine	9,818	Erskine	1972 (1977)
Houston and Killellan	6,650	Houston	Medieval
Langbank	1,089	Langbank	c. 1875
Howwood l/w	1,744	Howwood	
Kilbarchan	7,788	Kilbarchan	Medieval(1787)
Inchinnan	7,718	Inchinnan	Medieval
Johnstone: High	6,436	Johnstone High	1792
Johnstone Kirk	9,994	St Paul's, Johnstone	
Neilston	6,114	Neilston	Medieval
Paisley: Abbey	5,220	Paisley Abbey	Medieval
Paisley: North	17,409	Paisley North	1913
Paisley: Oakshaw Trinity (CoS/URC)	1,753	Oakshaw Trinity, Paisley	1754
Paisley: St George's	16,423	St George's, Paisley	1738
Paisley: St Mark's Oldhall	4,986	St Mark's Oldhall, Paisley	
Paisley:SherwoodGreenlaw	6,682	Sherwood Greenlaw, Paisley	1889
Paisley: South	13,231	Paisley South	1830s
Paisley: West	12,268	Paisley West	1808
Renfrew: North	10,094	Renfrew North	
Renfrew: Trinity	10,497	Trinity, Renfrew	1862
Gourock: St John's	5,367	St John's, Gourock	
Greenock: St Ninian's	13,379	[closed]	
Old Gourock and Ashton	13,379	Old Gourock & Ashton, Gourock	1769 (1832)
Greenock: East End	8,738	East End, Greenock (in comm. centre)	
Greenock: Mount Kirk	5,509	Mount Kirk, Greenock	
Greenock: Lyle Kirk	13,641	Lyle Kirk, Greenock	1591
Greenock: Lyle Kirk	13,641	StMargaret's, Greenock	1960s
Greenock: Wellpark Mid Kirk	3,131	Wellpark Mid, Greenock	
Greenock: Westburn	4,912	Westburn, Greenock	1841
Inverkip, Skelmorlie and Wemyss Bay	8,081	Inverkip	Medieval
Inverkip, Skelmorlie and Wemyss Bay	8,081	Skelmorlie	1856
Kilmacolm	5,264	Kilmacolm Old	Medieval(1831)
Port Glasgow: Hamilton Bardrainney	6,609	Hamilton Bardrainney, Port Glasgow	1963
Port Glasgow: New	9,088	Port Glasgow New	
Arrochar	912	Arrochar	1733 (1847)
Luss	367	St Kessog's, Luss	MPC (1875)
Rhu and Shandon	2,095	Rhu	C17th?
Baldernock	871	Baldernock	MPC (1795)
Milngavie: St Paul's	3,428	St Paul's, Milngavie	1841 (1906)
Bearsden: Baljaffray	4,149	Baljaffray, Bearsden	1973 (1993)
Bearsden: Boclair	9,762	Killermont, Bearsden	1935 (1957)
Bearsden: Boclair	9,762	Westerton, Bearsden	1957
Bearsden: Cross	6,707	Cross, Bearsden	1874
Bearsden: New Kilpatrick	6,881	New Kilpatrick	1649 (1807)
Bonhill	9,062	Bonhill	MPC (1836)
Renton: Trinity	2,301	Trinity, Renton	1883 (1892)
Cardross	2,604	Cardross	MPC (1872)
Clydebank: Faifley and Duntocher	12,401	Faifley	1845 (1966)
Clydebank: Kilbowie St Andrew's	5,883	Kilbowie St Andrew's, Clydebank	1897 (1904)
Clydebank: Waterfront	14,382	Waterfront, Clydebank	1876 (1978)
Dalmuir: Barclay	8,059	Barclay, Dalmuir	c. 1850 (1990)
Dumbarton	19,601	Dumbarton	MPC (1811)
Helensburgh	14,220	Helensburgh	1822 (1853)
Lochside	5,519	Craigrownie (Cove)	1853
Lochside	5,519	Garelochhead (in hall)	
Lochside	5,519	St Modan's, Rosneath	Medieval
Lomond	14,245	Lomond (Alexandria)	
Milngavie: Cairns	2,769	Cairns, Milngavie	1787
Milngavie: St Luke's	6,832	St Luke's, Milngavie	1843
Old Kilpatrick Bowling	4,939	Old Kilpatrick Bowling	MPC (1812)

== Presbytery of Glasgow ==
Parish(es)	Population	Buildings	Founded
Bishopbriggs: Kenmure p/l/w Cadder	3,882	Kenmure, Bishopbriggs	1855
Bishopbriggs: Springfield Cambridge	9,863	Springfield Cambridge, Bishopbriggs	1833
Broom	5,528	Broom	1941
Burnside Blairbeth	8,715	Burnside	
Busby	4,717	Busby	1835
Cadder	7,981	Cadder	Medieval(1825)
Cambuslang	17,686	Cambuslang	Medieval
Cambuslang: Flemingston Hallside	9,771	Flemingston Hallside, Cambuslang	1841
Campsie p/u/w Milton of Campsie	4,730	Campsie (Lennoxtown)	
Chryston	3,767	Chryston	
Eaglesham	3,946	Eaglesham	Medieval(1790)
Fernhill and Cathkin	4,637	Fernhill	
Gartcosh l/w Glenboig	3,396	Gartcosh	1929
Gartcosh l/w Glenboig	2,933	Glenboig	1889
Giffnock: Orchardhill	5,768	Orchardhill, Giffnock	c. 1900
Giffnock: South	2,857	Giffnock South	1912
Giffnock: The Park	2,686	Park, Giffnock	1940
Glasgow: Ballieston Mure Memorial	7,461	Mure Memorial, Baillieston	1873
Glasgow: Baillieston St Andrew's	9,136	St Andrew's, Baillieston	1833
Glasgow: Barlanark Greyfriars	5,731	Barlanark Greyfriars	1953
Glasgow: Blawarthill	3,824	Blawarthill	1941 (1964)
Glasgow: St Columba	N/A	St Columba's, Glasgow	1770
Glasgow: Bridgeton St Francis in the East	6,559	Bridgeton St Francis in the East	
Gl: Broomhill Hyndland	8,580	Broomhill	1902
Glasgow: Calton Old	19,455	Calton Old	
Glasgow: Cardonald	7,082	Cardonald	1887 (1889)
Glasgow: Carmunnock	3,824	Carmunnock	
Glasgow: Carmyle and Kenmuir Cornerstone	7,952	Kenmuir Cornerstone	
Glasgow: Carntyne and Cranhill	11,907	Carntyne	
Glasgow: Carnwadric	7,105	Carnwadric	
Glasgow: Castlemilk	12,614	Castlemilk	
Glasgow: Cathcart	12,347	Cathcart Trinity	1893
Glasgow: Cathedral (High or St Mungo's)	4,390	St Mungo's Cathedral	Medieval
Glasgow: Causeway (Tollcross)	8,157	Causeway (Tollcross)	
Glasgow: Clincarthill	5,903	Clincarthill	1865
Glasgow: Colston Milton	6,659	Colston Milton	
Glasgow: Colston Wellpark	3,472	Colston Wellpark	1915
Glasgow: Croftfoot	4,656	Croftfoot	1843 (1936)
Glasgow: Dennistoun New	9,985	Dennistoun New	c. 1875
Glasgow: Drumchapel St Andrew's and Yoker	19,296	Drumchapel St Andrew's	1893
Glasgow: Drumchapel St Mark's	6,805	Drumchapel St Mark's	1955
Glasgow: Easterhouse	8,934	Easterhouse	
Glasgow: Eastwood	7,329	Eastwood	
Glasgow: Gairbraid	5,031	Gairbraid	1855
Glasgow: Garthamlock, Ruchazie and Craigend	8,211	Garthamlock	1956
Stepps	6,634	Stepps	1900
Glasgow: Gorbals	12,875	Gorbals	1730 as a Chapel of Ease
Glasgow: Govan and Linthouse	15,326	New Govan	1873
Glasgow: Hillington Park and Priesthill Trinity	22,561	Hillington Park	1908
Glasgow: Ibrox	4,630	Ibrox	1863
Glasgow: Jordanhill	3,916	Jordanhill	1854
Glasgow: Kelvin West	20,420	Wellington	1792
Glasgow: Kelvinside Hillhead	4,723	Kelvinside Hillhead	1871
Glasgow: King's Park	6,188	King's Park	
Glasgow: Kinning Park	5,055	Kinning Park	
Glasgow: Knightswood Anniesland Trinity	23,445	St David's, Knightswood	1929
Glasgow: Knightswood Anniesland Trinity	23,445	Temple Anniesland	1892
Glasgow: Langside	5,839	Langside	1902
Glasgow: Maryhill Ruchill	22,441	Maryhill	
Glasgow: Merrylea	4,939	Merrylea	1904
Glasgow: Newlands South	2,530	Newlands South	1899
Glasgow: Partick Trinity	6,936	Partick Trinity	1863
Glasgow: Partick Victoria Park	12,877	Partick Victoria Park	1823
Glasgow: Pollokshaws	3,169	Pollokshaws	
Glasgow: Pollokshields	9,749	Pollokshields	1875
Glasgow: Possilpark (to be l/w or u/w Colston Milton)	6,939	Possilpark	
Glasgow: Queen's Park Govanhill	18,499	Queen's Park Govanhill	1833
Glasgow: Robroyston	6,132	Robroyston	1998
Glasgow: St Andrew and St Nicholas	10,700	St Nicholas' Cardonald	1937
Glasgow: St Andrew's East	5,753	[closed]	
Glasgow: St Andrew's West	13,079	St Andrew's West	1874
Glasgow: St Enoch's Hogganfield	5,413	St Enoch's, Hogganfield	
Glasgow: St George's Tron	3,708	St George's Tron	1808
Glasgow: St James' Pollok	9,473	St James, Pollok	1893
Glasgow: St John's Renfield	8,952	St John's Renfield	1819 (1931)
Glasgow: St Paul's	9,670	St Paul's, Provanmill	
Glasgow: St Rollox	4,364	St Rollox, Sighthill	
Glasgow: Sandyford Henderson Memorial	5,456	Sandyford Henderson Memorial	1856
Glasgow: Sandyhills	3,915	Sandyhills	
Glasgow: Scotstoun	6,121	Scotstoun	1902
Glasgow: Shawlands Trinity	11,797	Shawlands Trinity	1900
Glasgow: Sherbrooke Mosspark (to be u/w Ibrox)	9,394	Sherbrooke Mosspark	1894
Glasgow: Shettleston New	9,800	Shettleston New	1896
Glasgow: Springburn	8,673	Springburn	
Glasgow: Toryglen	4,921	Toryglen	1954
Glasgow: Trinity Possil and Henry Drummond	4,337	Trinity Possil & Henry Drummond	
Glasgow: Tron St Mary's	4,996	Tron St Mary's	1965
Glasgow: Wallacewell	5,492	Wallacewell [wound up?]	
Glasgow: Whiteinch (d/l/w Scotstoun)	5,082	Whiteinch (in comm. centre)	2000
Greenbank	5,514	Greenbank (Clarkston)	1884
Kilsyth: Anderson	5,349	Anderson, Kilsyth	1768
Kilsyth: Burns and Old	6,970	Burns & Old, Kilsyth	1816
Kirkintilloch: St Columba's Hillhead	13,914	Hillhead, Kirkintilloch	1948
Kirkintilloch: St Columba's Hillhead	13,914	St Columba's, Kirkintilloch	1968
Kirkintilloch: St David's Memorial Park	3,181	St David's Memorial Park, Kirkintilloch	1843
Kirkintilloch: St Mary's	2,745	St Mary's, Kirkintilloch	Medieval
Lenzie: Old (to be u/w the below)	5,403	Lenzie Old	1873
Lenzie: Union	3,745	Union, Lenzie	
Maxwell Mearns (Castle)	6,431	Maxwell Mearns Castle	
Mearns	6,825	Mearns	1813
Milton of Campsie	4,136	Milton of Campsie	
Moodiesburn	7,056	Moodiesburn	1994
Netherlee/and/Stamperland	8,168	Netherlee	1928
Newton Mearns	6,565	Newton Mearns	1743
Rutherglen: Old	7,769	Rutherglen Old	Ancient
Rutherglen: Stonelaw	3,382	Stonelaw, Rutherglen	1834
Rutherglen: West and Wardlawhill	4,016	West/Wardlawhill, Rutherglen	
Thornliebank	7,313	Thornliebank	1836
Torrance	2,375	Torrance	1869
Williamwood	3,250	Williamwood, Clarkston	1937
Cumbernauld: Abronhill (to be u/w Condorrat)	8,792	Abronhill, Cumbernauld	
Cumbernauld: Condorrat	10,840	Condorrat, Cumbernauld	1875
Cumbernauld: Trinity	34,446	Cumbernauld Trinity	Medieval

== Presbytery of Forth Valley and Clydesdale ==
Parishes	Pop'n	Building	Founded
Biggar l/w Black Mount	3,454	Biggar	
Biggar l/w Black Mount	545	Dolphinton	
Carluke: Forrest Kirk	10,511	St Andrew's, Carluke	Medieval
Carluke: Forrest Kirk	10,511	St John's, Carluke	1843
Carluke: Kirkton	4,374	Kirkton, Carluke	
Carnwath l/w Carstairs	2,329	Carnwath (in town hall)	
Carnwath l/w Carstairs	2,298	Carstairs	
Clydesdale Trinity	5,140	Cairngryffe	Medieval
Clydesdale Trinity	5,140	St Bride's, Douglas	1781
Coalburn and Lesmahagow	7,187	Coalburn	1893
Crossford and Kirkfieldbank	2,148	Crossford	
Forth: St Paul's	3,837	St Paul's, Forth	1875
Kirkmuirhill	4,806	Kirkmuirhill	1868
Lanark: Greyfriars	4,524	Greyfriars, Lanark	
Lanark: St Nicholas'	5,458	St Nicholas, Lanark	Medieval
Law	3,501	Law	
Upper Clyde	2,024	Abington	
Airdrie: Cairnlea l/w Calderbank	8,928	Cairnlea, Airdrie	
Airdrie: Cairnlea l/w Calderbank	2,538	Calderbank	
Airdrie: Clarkston	7,631	Clarkston, Airdrie	
Airdrie: High l/w Caldercruix and Longriggend	3,912	Airdrie High	1839
Airdrie: High l/w Caldercruix and Longriggend	3,181	Caldercruix	1893
Airdrie: Jackson	6,744	Jackson, Airdrie	1843
Airdrie: New Monkland l/w Greengairs	3,860	New Monkland (Glenmavis)	Medieval?
Airdrie: New Monkland l/w Greengairs	1,462	Greengairs	
Airdrie: New Wellwynd	3,669	St Columba's, Airdrie	
Airdrie: St Columba's	7,137	New Wellwynd, Airdrie	
Bellshill: Central	12,184	Bellshill Central	1874
Bellshill and Bothwell	9,274	Bellshill West (in church hall)	1877
Bellshill and Bothwell	6,615	Bothwell	Medieval
Blantyre: St Andrew's l/w Blantyre: Livingstone Memorial	8,181	St Andrew's, Blantyre	1843
Blantyre: St Andrew's l/w Blantyre: Livingstone Memorial	5,853	Livingstone Memorial, Blantyre	1876
Blantyre: Old	3,345	Blantyre Old	Medieval
Chapelhall l/w Kirk o' Shotts	6,496	Chapelhall	1857
Chapelhall l/w Kirk o' Shotts	1,496	Kirk o' Shotts	Medieval
Coatbridge: Blairhill-Dundyvan l/w Coatbridge: Middle	3,474	Blairhill-Dundyvan, Coatbridge	
Coatbridge: Blairhill-Dundyvan l/w Coatbridge: Middle	5,410	Coatbridge Middle	
Coatbridge: Calder l/w Coatbridge: Old Monkland	11,227	Calder, Coatbridge	
Coatbridge: Calder l/w Coatbridge: Old Monkland	12,928	Old Monkland	
Coatbridge: New St Andrew's	7,675	New St Andrew's, Coatbridge	1837
Coatbridge: Townhead	5,917	Townhead, Coatbridge	
Dalserf	2,635	Dalserf	1593
Dalserf	2,635	Rorison Mem., Ashgill	1889
East Kilbride: Calderglen	19,933	Claremont, East Kilbride	1970
East Kilbride: Greenhills	11,487	Greenhills, East Kilbride	1972
East Kilbride: Moncrieff	11,011	Moncrieff, East Kilbride	
East Kilbride: Mossneuk	7,698	Mossneuk, East Kilbride	c. 1990
East Kilbride: Old	4,921	East Kilbride Old	Medieval
East Kilbride: West Kirk and Stewartfield	10,793	East Kilbride West	1791
East Kilbride: Westwood	9,048	Westwood, East Kilbride	
Hamilton: Cadzow	5,938	Cadzow, Hamilton	1877
Hamilton: Gilmour and Whitehill	8,799	Gilmour and Whitehill, Hamilton	1877
Hamilton: Hillhouse	9,630	Hillhouse, Hamilton	1955
Hamilton: Old	8,377	Hamilton Old	Medieval(1734)
Hamilton: Old	8,377	Hamilton West	1874
Hamilton: St John's	2,274	St John's, Hamilton	
Hamilton: South l/w Quarter	6,676	Hamilton South	
Hamilton: South l/w Quarter	1,587	Quarter	
Hamilton: Trinity	10,992	Trinity, Hamilton	
Holytown l/w New Stevenston: Wrangholm Kirk	5,254	Holytown	pre-1688
Holytown l/w New Stevenston: Wrangholm Kirk	3,592	Wrangholm, New Stevenston	1843
Larkhall: New	15,048	Chalmers, Larkhall	1860
Larkhall: New	15,048	St Machan's, Larkhall	1835
Motherwell: Kirk at the Cross	9,776	Crosshill, Motherwell	1881
Motherwell: Kirk at the Cross	9,776	Dalziel St Andrew's, Motherwell	Medieval
Motherwell: North and Craigneuk	11,035	Motherwell North	
Motherwell: St Margaret's	6,969	St Margaret's, Motherwell	
Motherwell: St Mary's	3,507	St Mary's, Motherwell	c. 1900
Motherwell: South	4,733	Motherwell South	
Newarthill and Carfin	12,192	Newarthill	1802
Newmains: Bonkle and Coltness Memorial	5,951	Bonkle	1740
Newmains: Bonkle and Coltness Memorial	5,951	Coltness Memorial	
Overtown	4,278	Overtown	pre-1876
Shotts: Calderhead Erskine	10,326	Calderhead Erskine, Shotts	Medieval
Shotts: Calderhead Erskine	10,326	Allanton	
Stonehouse: St Ninian's (CoS/URC)	5,713	St Ninian's, Stonehouse	Medieval
Strathaven: Avendale Old and Drumclog	4,266	Avendale Old, Strathaven	Medieval
Strathaven: Avendale Old and Drumclog	4,266	Drumclog Memorial	
Strathaven: Trinity	6,377	Chapelton	Medieval
Strathaven: Trinity	6,377	Glassford	pre-1633
Strathaven: Trinity	6,377	Strathaven Trinity	1777
Uddingston: Burnhead	6,459	Burnhead, Uddingston	
Uddingston: Old	5,382	Uddingston Old	
Uddingston: Viewpark	9,020	Viewpark, Uddingston	1866
Wishaw: Cambusnethan North	3,708	Cambusnethan North, Wishaw	
Wishaw: New Kirk	16,461	St Mark's (New), Wishaw	
Wishaw: South Wishaw	8,029	South Wishaw	1874
Bo'ness	15,619	Bo'ness	1637
Bonnybridge: St Helen's	11,757	St Helen's, Bonnybridge	1877
Denny Old and Haggs	7,984	Denny Old	Medieval
Denny Old and Haggs	7,984	Haggs (Banknock)	1840
Denny: Westpark	4,336	Westpark, Denny	1843
Dunipace	2,928	Dunipace	Medieval
Falkirk: Camelon	12,981	Camelon, Falkirk	1842
Falkirk: Grahamston United (CoS/Meth/URC)	13,857	Grahamston United	1875
Falkirk: Laurieston l/w Redding and Westquarter	2,852	Laurieston, Falkirk	1889
Falkirk: Laurieston l/w Redding and Westquarter	3,415	Redding & Westquarter	1907
Falkirk: Trinity	8,653	Trinity, Falkirk	Medieval
Falkirk: Upper Braes	17,119	Brightons	1843
Falkirk: Upper Braes	17,119	Slamannan	Medieval
Grangemouth: Kirk of the Holy Rood	4,753	Holy Rood, Grangemouth	1963
Grangemouth: Parkview	12,620	Parkview, Grangemouth	1837
Larbert Cross	14,109	Bothkennar	Medieval
Larbert Cross	14,109	Larbert Old	Medieval
Larbert Tryst	16,758	Tryst	1843
Polmont: Old	5,394	Polmont Old	1724
81 parishes	650,152	106 buildings	

=== Closed churches ===
Church	Founded	Closed
St Kentigern's, Lanark	Medieval	1668
Kinneil Church	Medieval	1669
Quothquan Church	Medieval	1724
Old St Bride's, Douglas	Medieval	1781
Longriggend Church		C20th?
South Church, Airth	1806	1956
Broompark Church, Denny	1797	1963
Blackbraes Church	1860	1963
Carron Church	1878	1963
Tattie Kirk and Grahams Road Church, Falkirk	1747	1972
Trinity Church Camelon, Falkirk	1904	1973
West Church, Grangemouth	1893	1978
St Modan's, Falkirk		1986
Dunipace Old Church		1988
West Church, Falkirk	1767	1990
Dennyloanhead Church	1746	1991
Grange Church, Grangemouth	1853	1991
St Columba's, Morningside	1904	1994
Pettinain Church		1994
Covington Church		1994
St Helen's Church, Bonnybridge	1897	1990s
St Andrew's, Motherwell	1904	1996
Whitehill Church, Hamilton		1999
Orbiston Church, Bellshill	1954	2001
St John's Camelon, Falkirk		2003
Limerigg Church	1885	2003
Thornlie Church, Wishaw		2004
Cairneymount Church	1904	2005
Carronshore Church	1874	2005
Dundas Church, Grangemouth	1893	2006
Ferniegair Church, Hamilton	1902	2006
South Dalziel Church, Motherwell	1789	2007
Clifton Church, Coatbridge	1875	2008
Carfin Church		2012
Hamilton North Church		2012
Burnbank Church, Hamilton		2013
Erskine Church, Falkirk	1738	2014
Leadhills Church		pre-2014
Carstairs Junction Church	1879	2015
Douglas Water and Rigside Church	1681	30 Aug 2015
Broomknoll Church, Airdrie		2016
Culter Church		2016
St James, Falkirk		2018
East Church, Strathaven		2018
Lesmahagow-Abbeygreen	1843	2020 (left for Free Church)
Bargeddie Church	1876	2021
Blackness Church	pre-1949	c. 2021
Kirkfieldbank Church		2022
Cleland Church	1878	c. 2023
Carriden Church, Bo'ness	Medieval	2023
Lesmahagow Old Church	Medieval	2023
Blackbraes and Shieldhill Church, Shieldhill	1864	2024
Muiravonside Church	Medieval	2024
South Church, East Kilbride	c. 1964	2024
Cambusnethan Old Church	Medieval	2024
Libberton Church		2024
Wishaw Old Church	1840	2024
Bainsford Church, Falkirk	c1850 (1888)	29 Dec 2024
Trinity Church, Larkhall		2025
Airth Church	Medieval	2025
West Church, Larbert	1898	2025
Stenhouse and Carron Church, Stenhousemuir	1899	2025
Craigneuk and Belhaven Church, Wishaw	1897	2025
Abbotsgrange Church, Grangemouth	1897	2025
St Andrew's West, Falkirk	1843	2025
Bellshill West Church, Bellshill	1877	2025
St Andrew's Church, Bo'ness	1843	2025

== Presbytery of Fife ==
The former presbyteries of Dunfermline, Kirkcaldy and St Andrews merged in January 2021.

Parish(es)	Population	Buildings	Founded
Beath and Cowdenbeath: North	5,288	Cowdenbeath North	Medieval
Cairneyhill l/w Limekilns	2,576	Cairneyhill	1752
Cairneyhill l/w Limekilns	1,916	Limekilns	1781
Carnock and Oakley	4,347	Oakley	
Cowdenbeath: Trinity	8,972	Trinity, Cowdenbeath	
Cowdenbeath: Trinity	8,972	Crossgates	
Culross and Torryburn	4,606	Valleyfield	
Dunfermline: Abbey	4,467	Dunfermline Abbey	Medieval
Dunfermline: East	9,162	Dunfermline East	
Dunfermline: Gillespie Memorial	3,089	Gillespie Memorial, Dunfermline	1752
Dunfermline: North	6,521	Dunfermline North	
Dunfermline: St Columba's	7,473	St Columba's, Dunfermline	
Dunfermline: St Leonard's	10,023	St Leonard's, Dunfermline	1894
Dunfermline:St Margaret's	6,582	St Margaret's, Dunfermline	1825
Dunfermline: St Ninian's	7,118	St Ninian's, Dunfermline	
Forthview	31,902	St Fillan's, Aberdour	Medieval
Forthview	31,902	Dalgety	Medieval
Forthview	31,902	Inverkeithing	Medieval
Forthview	31,902	North Queensferry	1859
Forthview	31,902	Rosyth	1917
Kelty	6,506	Kelty	
Lochgelly and Benarty: St Serf's	12,610	Ballingry	
Lochgelly and Benarty: St Serf's	12,610	Lochgelly	
Saline and Blairingone l/w Tulliallan and Kincardine	2,138	Saline	Medieval
Saline and Blairingone l/w Tulliallan and Kincardine		Kincardine	
Auchterderran Kinglassie	7,745	St Fothad's, Auchterderran	Medieval
Auchterderran Kinglassie	7,745	Kinglassie	Medieval
Auchtertool	623	Auchtertool	Medieval
Burntisland and Kinghorn	9,354	Burntisland	1592
Burntisland and Kinghorn	9,354	Kinghorn	Medieval
Dysart: St Clair	6,916	St Clair's, Dysart	
Heart of Fife (Glenrothes, Leslie, Markinch and Thornton)	48,277	Christ's Kirk, Glenrothes	1978
Heart of Fife (Glenrothes, Leslie, Markinch and Thornton)	48,277	St Columba's, Glenrothes	
Heart of Fife (Glenrothes, Leslie, Markinch and Thornton)	48,277	St Margaret's, Glenrothes	1953
Heart of Fife (Glenrothes, Leslie, Markinch and Thornton)	48,277	St Ninian's, Glenrothes	c. 1967
Heart of Fife (Glenrothes, Leslie, Markinch and Thornton)	48,277	Trinity, Leslie	
Heart of Fife (Glenrothes, Leslie, Markinch and Thornton)	48,277	Markinch	Medieval
Heart of Fife (Glenrothes, Leslie, Markinch and Thornton)	48,277	Thornton	
Kennoway, Windygates and Balgonie: St Kenneth's l/w Leven	7,884	Kennoway	
Kennoway, Windygates and Balgonie: St Kenneth's l/w Leven	9,004	Leven	
Kirkcaldy: Hope	16,986	Hope (Torbain), Kirkcaldy	
Kirkcaldy: Langtoun Central	20,959	Abbotshall, Kirkcaldy	1650
Kirkcaldy: Langtoun Central	20,959	Bennochy, Kirkcaldy	1885
Kirkcaldy: Langtoun Central	20,959	Linktown, Kirkcaldy	1737
Kirkcaldy: Langtoun Central	20,959	St Bryce's, Kirkcaldy	1843
Kirkcaldy: Pathhead	4,914	Pathhead, Kirkcaldy	
Methil: Wellesley	5,786	Wellesley, Methil	
New Hope Kirk Levenmouth	12,469	West Wemyss	
New Hope Kirk Levenmouth	12,469	Methil	
Balmerino and Wormit	2,351	Balmerino	Medieval
Balmerino and Wormit	2,351	Wormit	1895
Boarhills, Dunino and St Andrews: Holy Trinity	6,376	Dunino	Medieval
Boarhills, Dunino and St Andrews: Holy Trinity	6,376	Holy Trinity, St Andrews	Medieval
Creich, Flisk and Kilmany	743	Creich, Flisk & Kilmany (Luthrie)	
Cupar: Old and St Michael of Tarvit l/w Monimail	5,994	Old and St Michael of Tarvit, Cupar	Medieval
Cupar: Old and St Michael of Tarvit l/w Monimail	653	Old and St Michael of Tarvit, Cupar	Medieval
Cupar: St John's and Dairsie United	4,157	St John's, Cupar	1843
East Fife Rural Parish Church l/w Ceres, Kemback and Springfield	1,991	Carnbee	
East Fife Rural Parish Church l/w Ceres, Kemback and Springfield	1,991	Kilrenny	Medieval
East Fife Rural Parish Church l/w Ceres, Kemback and Springfield	1,991	Kingsbarns	
East Fife Rural Parish Church l/w Ceres, Kemback and Springfield	1,991	Largoward	1835
East Fife Rural Parish Church l/w Ceres, Kemback and Springfield	3,432	Ceres	
East Fife Rural Parish Church l/w Ceres, Kemback and Springfield	3,432	Springfield	
Fife Coastal Trinity	5,793	Elie	1831
Fife Coastal Trinity	5,793	Kilconquhar	1821
Fife Coastal Trinity	5,793	Largo	
Fife Coastal Trinity	5,793	St Monans (in church hall)	
Fife Eden Tay	13,176	Falkland	
Fife Eden Tay	13,176	Freuchie	
Fife Eden Tay	13,176	Kettle (Kingskettle)	1636(1832)
Fife Eden Tay	13,176	Abdie (Lindores)	
Fife Eden Tay	13,176	Newburgh	
Fife Eden Tay	13,176	Auchtermuchty	APC(1780)
Fife Eden Tay	13,176	Strathmiglo	APC(1784)
Leuchars: St Athernase and Tayport	9,569	St Athernase, Leuchars	Medieval
Leuchars: St Athernase and Tayport	9,569	Tayport	
Newport-on-Tay	3,168	Newport-on-Tay	
St Adrian's East Neuk l/w Crail Church	4,651	Anstruther	
St Adrian's East Neuk l/w Crail Church	4,651	Cellardyke	
St Adrian's East Neuk l/w Crail Church	4,651	Pittenweeem	
St Adrian's East Neuk l/w Crail Church	1,812	Crail	
St Andrews: New Kirk	12,594	Hope Park, St Andrews	1733
St Andrews: New Kirk	12,594	Cameron	
St Andrews: New Kirk	12,594	St Leonard's, St Andrews	

=== Closed churches ===
Church	Founded	Closed
St Andrews Cathedral	Medieval	1561
Lathrisk Church (Old Kettle)		1636
Kerr Memorial Church, Ladybank	C19th	1940s
Kettle West Church		1950s
Balmalcolm Church, Kettle		1950s
Newburn Church	Medieval	1958
Dairsie Old Church	1621	1966
Flisk Church		1971
St Kenneth's, Milton of Balgonie		1980s
Kilmany Church	Medieval	c. 1990
Tulliallan Church		c. 2000
St Andrew's, Leven		2000
Denbeath Church, Buckhaven		c. 2005
Blairingone Church		2006
St Peter's, Inverkeithing		2007
Edenshead Church, Gateside	1823	2007
Dunbog Church		2008
St Andrew's, Kirkcaldy	1885	2010
Kirkcaldy Old Church	Medieval	2010
Innerleven East Church, Methil		2012
Leslie Old Church		2012
Collessie Church	1839	2015
St Columba's, Rosyth		2016
Colinsburgh Church		2016
Boarhills Church		2016
St David's, Largo		c. 2017
Kilmany Church		2017
Colinsburgh Church		c. 2018
Gauldry Church		2019
St Andrew's, Buckhaven		2019
Carnock Church	1840	2021
Cults Church	APC (1793)	2021
Windygates Church		2022
Viewforth Church, Kirkcaldy	1875	2022
Collessie Church	APC (1839)	2022
Ladybank Church	C19th	c. 2022
Strathkinness Church	1864	2022
Templehall Church, Kirkcaldy	1952	2023
Kemback Church	APC (1814)	2023
Kingseat Church		2024
Townhill Church, Dunfermline		2024
Dairsie United Church	Medieval	2024
Monimail Church		2025
Culross Abbey	Medieval	2025

== Presbytery of Perth ==
Parish	Pop'n	Buildings	Founded
Carse of Gowrie	5,139	Abernyte	Medieval
Carse of Gowrie	5,139	Inchture	
Carse of Gowrie	5,139	Longforgan	
Carse of Gowrie	5,139	Invergowrie	
Dundee: Balgay	5,838	[closed]	
Dundee: Broughty Ferry	17,344	Barnhill St Margaret's, Broughty Ferry	1884 (1895)
Dundee: Broughty Ferry	17,344	Queen Street East, Broughty Ferry	1826 (1865)
Dundee: Broughty Ferry St Stephens' and West	2,119	St Stephen's & West, Broughty Ferry	1871
Dundee: Dundee (St Mary's)	1,982	St Mary's, Dundee	Medieval
Dundee: Craigowl	12,170	Craigowl, Dundee	1851 (1968)
Dundee: Downfield Mains	9,898	Downfield Mains	
Dundee: Kingsgait	5,046	Kingsgait (St Andrew's), Dundee	1774
Dundee: Law	16,291	Coldside, Dundee	
Dundee: Law	16,291	Steeple, Dundee	1789
Dundee: Northeast	29,080	Douglas & Mid Craigie	
Dundee: Northeast	29,080	Fintry	
Dundee: Stobswell Trinity	13,144	Trinity, Dundee	1841
Dundee: Westgait	33,910	Lochee, Dundee	1871
Dundee: Westgait	33,910	Menzieshill, Dundee	
Dundee: Westgait	33,910	Logie/StJohn's/Cross	1759
Monifieth South Angus	13,397	Monifieth	Medieval(2019)
Sidlaw	4,722	Auchterhouse	
Sidlaw	4,722	Muirhead	1843
Arbroath and District	29,194	Carmyllie	Medieval(1609)
Arbroath and District	29,194	St Andrew's, Arbroath	1889
Arbroath and District	29,194	St Vigean's, Arbroath	Medieval
Arbroath and District	29,194	West Kirk, Arbroath	1879
Arbroath and District	29,194	Friockheim (in comm. centre)	1835 (1882)
Arbroath and District	29,194	Inverkeilor	Medieval
Brechin and Farnell	8,582	Gardner Memorial, Brechin	
Brechin and Farnell	8,582	Farnell	
Carnoustie: Trinity	12,110	Barry	Medieval
Carnoustie: Trinity	12,110	Carnoustie	
Carnoustie: Trinity	12,110	Newton	1843
Edzell	2,309	Edzell	
Forfar: All Souls	13,118	Aberlemno	Medieval
Forfar: All Souls	13,118	Letham	
Forfar: All Souls	13,118	All Souls (Lowson Memorial), Forfar	
Forfar: East, Old and Inverarity	5,803	East & Old, Forfar	Medieval(1791)
Forfar: East, Old and Inverarity	5,803	Inverarity	1754
Isla Parishes	1,289	Kilry (Bridge of Craigisla)	1877
Montrose Trinity	15,991	Old & St Andrew's, Montrose	Medieval
Montrose Trinity	15,991	Inchbrayock (Ferryden)	Medieval
Montrose Trinity	15,991	Hillside	
Oathlaw Tannadice l/w The Glens and Kirriemuir United	630	Tannadice	Ancient
Oathlaw Tannadice l/w The Glens and Kirriemuir United	7,247	Kirriemuir United	Ancient
Aberdalgie and Forteviot	664	Aberdalgie	
Aberdalgie and Forteviot	664	Forteviot	
Dunbarney and Forgandenny	3,963	Dunbarney (Bridge of Earn)	
Dunbarney and Forgandenny	3,963	Forgandenny	
Aberuthven and Dunning	1,776	Aberuthven	
Aberuthven and Dunning	1,776	Dunning	
Almondbank and Tibbermore l/w Methven and Logiealmond	1,688	St Serf's, Almondbank	1905
Almondbank and Tibbermore l/w Methven and Logiealmond	2,683	Methven	Med (1793)
Ardoch and Blackford	2,784	Ardoch (Braco)	
Ardoch and Blackford	2,784	Blackford	
Auchterarder	4,231	Auchterarder	
Auchtergaven and Moneydie l/w Redgorton and Stanley	1,669	Bankfoot	
Auchtergaven and Moneydie l/w Redgorton and Stanley	3,292	Stanley (in village hall)	
Cargill Burrelton l/w Collace	1,255	Burrelton	1855
Cargill Burrelton l/w Collace	528	Collace	Med (1813)
Cargill Burrelton l/w Collace	346	Kinclaven	Medieval
Comrie and Dundurn	2,471	Comrie	Med (1805)
Comrie and Dundurn	2,471	Dundurn (St Fillans)	
Crieff	7,945	St Andrew's, Crieff	
Errol	2,554	Errol	Medieval
Kinross-shire	11,255	Orwell (Milnathort)	
Kinross-shire	11,255	Fossoway (Crook of Devon)	1729
Kinross-shire	11,255	Kinross	
Kirk of St Bride Abernethy	3,027	Abernethy	
Mid Strathearn	1,080	St Bean's, Fowlis Wester	
Mid Strathearn	1,080	Findo Gask	
Mid Strathearn	1,080	Madderty	
Muthill	1,531	Muthill	Medieval(1828)
Perth: Craigie and Moncreiffe	5,463	Moncrieffe, Perth	1950 (1977)
Perth: Kinnoull	3,785	Kinnoull	Med (1827)
Perth: Letham St Mark's	9,554	Letham St Mark's, Perth	
Perth: North	5,661	Perth North	1880
Perth: Riverside	7,040	Riverside, Perth	
Perth: Riverside	7,040	Bertha Park Mission	2023
Perth: St John's Kirk of Perth	3,524	St John's, Perth	Medieval
Perth: St Leonard's-in-the-Fields	7,013	St Leonard's-in-the-Fields, Perth	1835 (1882)
Perth: St Matthew's	4,974	St Matthew's, Perth	1871
St Madoes and Kinfauns	1,909	St Madoes (Glencarse)	
Scone and St Martins	6,154	Scone Old	
Scone and St Martins	6,154	Scone New	
Aberfeldy	1,986	Aberfeldy	
Dull and Weem	421	Weem	Medieval(1875)
Grantully, Logierait and Strathtay	1,178	Logierait	Medieval(1805)
Grantully, Logierait and Strathtay	1,178	Strathtay	1899
Alyth	3,054	Alyth (High)	1839
Bendochy l/w Coupar Angus: Abbey	67	Bendochy	Medieval
Bendochy l/w Coupar Angus: Abbey	2,328	Coupar Angus Abbey	Medieval
Blair Atholl and Struan l/w Pitlochry	767	Blair Atholl	Medieval
Blair Atholl and Struan l/w Pitlochry	3,055	Pitlochry	Medieval
Blairgowrie	6,346	Blairgowrie	
Fortingall, Glenlyon, Kenmore and Lawers l/w Rannoch	880	Fortingall	MPC (1902)
Fortingall, Glenlyon, Kenmore and Lawers l/w Rannoch	625	(Kinloch) Rannoch	1829
Dunkeld	4,199	Dunkeld Cathedral	Medieval
Dunkeld	4,199	Amulree	
Dunkeld	4,199	Little Dunkeld	
Kirkmichael, Straloch and Glenshee l/w Rattray	971	Kirkmichael	
Kirkmichael, Straloch and Glenshee l/w Rattray	3,279	Rattray	
Strathmore	3,720	Kettins	Medieval
Strathmore	3,720	Meigle	Ancient
Strathmore	3,720	Newtyle	1872
Strathmore	3,720	St Fergus', Glamis	Medieval
Tenandry	264	Tenandry	1836
Aberfoyle	1,151	Aberfoyle	
Alloa: Ludgate	7,214	Ludgate, Alloa	
Alloa: St Mungo's	6,838	St Mungo's, Alloa	Medieval
Alva	4,773	Alva	
Balfron and Fintry l/w Drymen and East Loch Lomond	2,702	Balfron	MPC (1830s)
Balfron and Fintry l/w Drymen and East Loch Lomond	1,873	Drymen	Medieval
Balquhidder l/w Killin and Ardeonaig	785	Balquhidder	
Balquhidder l/w Killin and Ardeonaig	970	Killin	
Bannockburn: Allan (d/u/w Ladywell)	5,166	Allan, Bannockburn	1838
Bannockburn: Ladywell	4,813	Ladywell, Bannockburn	1843 (1957)
Bridge of Allan	4,953	Bridge of Allan	
Buchlyvie and Gartmore	1,189	Buchlyvie	1835
Buchlyvie and Gartmore	1,189	Gartmore	1790
Callander	3,463	St Kessog's, Callander	1735
Callander	3,463	Trossachs (Brigo'Turk)	1849
Cambusbarron: The Bruce Memorial	3,146	Bruce Memorial, Cambusbarron	
Clackmannan l/w Sauchie and Coalsnaughton	3,773	Clackmannan	Ancient
Clackmannan l/w Sauchie and Coalsnaughton	7,433	Sauchie	
Cowie and Plean l/w Fallin	5,017	Plean	1839
Cowie and Plean l/w Fallin	3,136	Fallin	1908
East Hillfoots	2,943	Dollar	
East Hillfoots	940	(Pool of) Muckhart	
Dunblane Cathedral, Kilmadock and Blair Drummond	9,895	Dunblane Cathedral	Medieval
Dunblane: St Blane's l/w Lecropt	2,292	St Blane's, Dunblane	1758 (1854)
Dunblane: St Blane's l/w Lecropt	88	Lecropt	MPC (1827)
Gargunnock l/w Kippen and Norrieston l/w Port of Menteith	1,049	Gargunnock	
Gargunnock l/w Kippen and Norrieston l/w Port of Menteith	2,128	Kippen	Medieval
Gargunnock l/w Kippen and Norrieston l/w Port of Menteith	2,128	Norrieston (Thornhill)	c. 1650
Gargunnock l/w Kippen and Norrieston l/w Port of Menteith	370	Port of Menteith	
Killearn l/w Strathblane	2,382	Killearn	Medieval
Killearn l/w Strathblane	2,342	Strathblane	
Logie	5,383	Logie	Medieval
Menstrie	2,804	Menstrie	
Stirling:HolyRude/Viewfield	7,132	Holy Rude, Stirling	Medieval
Stirling:HolyRude/Viewfield	7,132	Viewfield, Stirling	1752
Stirling: North	4,758	North, Stirling	
Stirling: Park	3,984	Park, Stirling	
Stirling: St Mark's	4,370	St Mark's, Stirling	
Stirling: St Ninian's Old	5,155	St Ninian's Old, Stirling	Medieval
Tillicoultry	5,281	Tillicoultry	
Tullibody: St Serf's	9,806	St Serf's, Tullibody	Medieval

^{1}formerly in the Presbytery of Angus

=== Closed churches ===
Church	Founded	Closed
Navar Church	Medieval	1727
Tullibole Church	Medieval	1729
Old (St Moloc's) Church, Alyth	Medieval	C17th-19th
St Mary's, Grantully	c. 1533	1892
Lunan Church	Medieval	C20th
St Andrew's Church, Perth	1885	C20th
Cargill Church	Medieval (1831)	C20th
Kirkden Church	Medieval	1952
Lethnot Church	Medieval	1953
Erskine Church, Arbroath		1957
St Ninian's, Arbroath		1959
Straloch Church		c. 1960
Old South Church, Crieff	1882	1964
Wilson Church, Perth		1965
Scott Street Church, Perth		1965
Bridgend Church, Perth		1965
Perth Middle Church	1887	1965
Kinnell Church	1855	1967
Ladyloan Church, Arbroath		1973
Lawers Church	1669	late C20th
Alyth Barony Church	1745	1976
Old St Paul's and St David's, Dundee	1582	1981
Tealing Church	Medieval (1808)	1982
St Leonard's, Perth	1836	1985
St Paul's, Perth	1807	1986
Ardler Church	1885	1986
Tibbermore Church	Medieval	1986
Kinfauns Church		1989
(Ladyloan) St Columba's, Arbroath	1867	1990
Arbroath Old Church	1590 (1896)	1992
Dron Church		1995
Menmuir Church	Medieval	1990s
Dull Church	Medieval	c. 2000
Rhynd Church, Perth		2001
St Mary's South, Blairgowrie		2002
St David's North Church, Dundee		2003
Kinnettles Church	Medieval	2006
Newbigging Church	1790	2007
South Church, Monifieth	mid-C19th	2008
Panmure Church, Monifieth	1935	2008
Kingoldrum Church	Medieval	2009
St Meddan's, Airlie	Medieval	2010
Ruthven Church	Medieval	2010
Glenisla Church	Medieval	2010
Lintrathen Church	Medieval	2011
Dunnichen Church		2011
Fairmuir Church, Dundee		2011
St Aidan's, Broughty Ferry		2012
St Michael's, Crieff	1882	2012
St David's, Dundee	1928	2014
Nevay Church		2015
Downfield South Church		c. 2015
Struan Church		c. 2015
Cowie Church		2017
Lundie Church	Medieval	2017
Knox's Church, Arbroath	1866	2018
Melville South Church, Montrose	1861	2018
Liff Church	1839	2019
Foss Church	Medieval	2019
St Anne's, Dowally		2019
St David's, Stormontfield		2019
St Andrew's, Kirriemuir		30 Jun 2019
St Rule's, Monifieth		Sept 2019
Allan Park South Church, Stirling		2020
St David's High Kirk, Dundee	1877	2020
Craigiebank Church, Dundee	1938	2021
Stracathro Church		2021
Holy Trinity Cathedral, Brechin	Ancient	2021
Trinity Gask Church	Medieval (1770)	c. 2022
Kilspindie Church		2022
Dun Church	Medieval (1834)	2022
Kinnaird Church	1815	2022
Meadowside St Paul's Church, Dundee		2022
Stobswell Church, Dundee	1868	27 Feb 2022
Panbride Church, Carnoustie		2022
Monikie Church, Kirkton of Monikie	Medieval (1812)	2023
Murroes Church		2023
Maule Memorial Church Glenesk, Cairncross	1857	2023
Careston Church	1635	2023
Fern Church	Medieval (1883)	2023
Cortachy Church	1828	2023
Whitfield Church, Dundee	1969	2023
Colliston Church	1871	31 Mar 2024
Old and Abbey Church, Arbroath	Medieval	7 Apr 2024
Arbirlot Church	Medieval (1832)	21 Apr 2024
Clunie Church	Medieval	2025
Caputh Church	Medieval	2025
Buchanan Church, Milton of Buchanan		2025
Glenshee Church	1822	2025
Dundee: West	1884	2026

== Presbytery of the North East and Northern Isles ==
The presbyteries of Aberdeen and Shetland merged on 1 June 2020. The presbytery of Aberdeen and Shetland then merged with the presbyteries of Moray, Orkney, Gordon, Buchan, and Kincardine and Deeside to form the current presbytery.

Since 1 October 2024 the Church of Scotland's congregations in Orkney have been united in a single Orkney Islands Church of Scotland, retaining most church buildings and staffed by a team ministry.

The former Presbytery of Orkney was split into the three presbyteries of Cairston, Kirkwall and North Isles in 1725. It is not known exactly when they reunited, though it is likely to have occurred with the union of the United Free Church of Scotland the Church of Scotland on 2 October 1929.

Parish(es)	Population	Buildings	Founded
Aberdeen: Bridge of Don Oldmachar	11,263	Oldmachar, Bridge of Don	
Aberdeen: Devana	34,315	Ferryhill	
Aberdeen: Devana	34,315	South Holburn	
Aberdeen: Fountainhall	20,498	Queen's Cross	1881
Aberdeen: Fountainhall	20,498	Midstocket	
Aberdeen: Hillside	19,813	Hillside	
Aberdeen: Mannofield	4,951	Mannofield	1881
Aberdeen: North	22,717	Aberdeen North	1954
Aberdeen: St Columba's Bridge of Don	11,253	St Columba's, Bridge of Don	1983
Aberdeen: St Machar's Cathedral	16,038	St Machar's Cathedral	Ancient
Aberdeen: St Stephen's	7,369	St Stephen's, Aberdeen	1879
Aberdeen: South	26,162	Torry St Fittick's	1899
Aberdeen: Springfield	10,826	Springfield	1873
Aberdeen: Stockethill	4,062	Stockethill (in comm. centre)	1949
Brimmond	8,005	Brimmond (Newhills)	
Cults	9,059	Cults	1843
Dyce l/w New Machar	5,908	Dyce	MPC (1890s)
Dyce l/w New Machar	4,063	Newmachar	
Kingshill	20,394	Skene	Medieval(1801)
Kingshill	20,394	Trinity, Westhill	1981
Peterculter	7,676	Peterculter	
Aberdour	763	St Drostan's, New Aberdour	MPC (1818)
Auchterless/and/Auchaber	2,065	Auchterless	
Banff	4,948	Banff	
Crimond l/w Lonmay	851	Crimond	1812
Crimond l/w Lonmay	1,699	Lonmay	
Cruden	3,502	St Olaf's, Cruden	
Deer	3,274	Deer (Old Deer)	
Fraserburgh and District	18,010	Fraserburgh	1843
Fraserburgh and District	18,010	Pitsligo (Rosehearty)	1882
Fraserburgh and District	18,010	Inverallochy	
Fyvie l/w Rothienorman	1,502	Fyvie	
Fyvie l/w Rothienorman	1,642	Rothienorman	
Longside	3,342	Longside	
Banffshire East	7,042	Macduff	
Banffshire East	7,042	Whitehills	
Maud and Savoch l/w New Deer: St Kane's	1,880	Maud	
Maud and Savoch l/w New Deer: St Kane's	1,703	[closed]	
Mormond West	2,988	Strichen	
Ordiquhill and Cornhill	485	Cornhill	
Peterhead: New	13,536	Peterhead New	
Peterhead: St Andrew's	7,021	St Andrew's, Peterhead	
Portsoy	2,531	Portsoy	
East Caithness		Argyle Square, Wick	
East Caithness		Lybster	
Strathdeveron	11,025	Marnoch (Aberchirder)	
Strathdeveron	11,025	Monquhitter (Cuminestown)	
Strathdeveron	11,025	St Andrew's, Turriff	
Strathdeveron	11,025	St Ninian's, Turriff	
Belhelvie	5,082	Belhelvie	
Bennachie	14,256	Chapel of Garioch	1813
Bennachie	14,256	Echt	c. 1800
Bennachie	14,256	Kemnay	1845
Bennachie	14,256	Kintore	Medieval (1819)
Bennachie	14,256	Monymusk	Medieval
Culsalmond and Rayne l/w Daviot	1,432	Rayne	
Culsalmond and Rayne l/w Daviot	855	Daviot	
Ellon	12,322	Ellon	
Fintray Kinellar Keithhall	1,485	Fintray	Medieval
Formartine	4,761	Tarves	Medieval (1798)
Formartine	4,761	Pitmedden	1843 (1864)
Foveran	2,393	Holyrood Chapel, Newburgh	1882
Huntly Cairnie Glass	3,779	Huntly Cairnie Glass	
Insch Leslie Premnay Oyne	3,685	St Drostan's, Insch	MPC (1883)
Inverurie: St Andrew's	4,949	St Andrew's, Inverurie	Medieval
Inverurie: West	7,767	Inverurie West	1843
Meldrum and Bourtie	3,938	Meldrum (Oldmeldrum)	Medieval
Methlick	1,092	Methlick	MPC (1867)
Strathbogie Drumblade	2,525	Strathbogie (Huntly)	1843
West Gordon (Alford, Strathdon, Rhynie)	7,749	Alford	1866
West Gordon (Alford, Strathdon, Rhynie)	7,749	Strathdon	1853
West Gordon (Alford, Strathdon, Rhynie)	7,749	Rhynie	1823
Aboyne-Dinnet l/w Cromar	3,024	Aboyne	1761
Aboyne-Dinnet l/w Cromar	1,667	Coull	Ancient
Aboyne-Dinnet l/w Cromar	1,667	St Moluag's, Tarland	Medieval
Arbuthnott, Bervie and Kinneff	4,191	Inverbervie (Bervie)	1837
Banchory-Ternan: East	6,268	Banchory-Ternan East	MPC (1825)
Banchory-Ternan: West	2,647	Banchory-Ternan West	
Birse and Feughside	1,443	Feughside (Finzean)	1863
Braemar and Crathie	808	Crathie	Medieval
Glenmuick (Ballater)	1,919	Glenmuick (Ballater)	1800
Howe o' the Mearns	7,661	Aberluthnott (Luthermuir)	
Howe o' the Mearns	7,661	Fettercairn	
Howe o' the Mearns	7,661	Fordoun (Auchenblae)	Medieval
Howe o' the Mearns	7,661	Glenbervie	
Howe o' the Mearns	7,661	Laurencekirk	
Kincardine Coastal	11,905	Newtonhill	
Kincardine Coastal	11,905	Portlethen	
Maryculter Trinity	1,943	Maryculter	Medieval
Mid Deeside	3,656	Torphins	
St Cyrus	2,754	St Cyrus	Medieval
Stonehaven: Carronside	6,000	Dunnottar, Stonehaven	1852
Stonehaven: Fetteresso	6,511	Fetteresso, Stonehaven	Medieval
Aberlour	2,204	Aberlour (Charlestown)	
Aberlour	2,204	Craigellachie	
Bellie and Speymouth	4,940	Bellie (Fochabers)	Medieval(1798)
Buckie: North and Rathven	5,624	Buckie North	
Buckie: South, West and Enzie	4,661	Buckie South & West	1850
Cullen and Deskford	1,817	Cullen Old	Medieval
Cullen and Deskford	1,817	Cullen Hall	
Laich of Moray	11,316	Duffus	Medieval
Laich of Moray	11,316	Hopeman	1857
Laich of Moray	11,316	St James, Lossiemouth	1841
Elgin	24,652	St Columba's, Elgin	1906
Elgin	24,652	St Giles, Elgin	Medieval
Findochty l/w Portknockie	1,209	Findochty	1863
Findochty l/w Portknockie	1,269	Portknockie	1868
Keith: Kirk of St Rufus, Botriphnie and Grange	4,243	St Rufus, Keith	Medieval
Keith: Kirk of St Rufus, Botriphnie and Grange	4,243	(Davoch of) Grange	
Keith: North, Newmill, Boharm and Rothiemay	3,613	Keith North	1845
Keith: North, Newmill, Boharm and Rothiemay	3,613	Rothiemay (Milltown)	Medieval
Knockando/Elchies/Archiestown	834	Knockando	Medieval
Mortlach and Rothes	3,698	Mortlach (Dufftown)	Medieval
Mortlach and Rothes	3,698	Rothes	Medieval
St Andrew's-Lhanbryd and Urquhart	3,301	St Andrew's, Lhanbryde	Medieval
Orkney	19,743	East Mainland (Holm)	
Orkney	19,743	North Ronaldsay (in school)	
Orkney	19,743	Cross Kirk, Sanday (building locally owned)	
Orkney	19,743	St Magnus Cathedral	Medieval
Orkney	19,743	Flotta (building locally owned)	
Orkney	19,743	Rousay (in school)	
Orkney	19,743	Eday	
Orkney	19,743	Moncur Memorial, Stronsay	1955
Orkney	19,743	Kirkwall East	1796
Orkney	19,743	North, Shapinsay	
Orkney	19,743	St Margaret's, St Margaret's Hope	
Orkney	19,743	St Columba's, Longhope, South Walls	1832
Orkney	19,743	St Peter's, Stromness*	
Orkney	19,743	Milestone, Dounby	
Orkney	19,743	Firth (Finstown)	
Orkney	19,743	Orphir	
Orkney	19,743	Westray	
Orkney	19,743	St Ann's, Papa Westray	
Evie and Rendall	729	Hackland, Rendall	
Shetland	23,167	Aith	
Shetland	23,167	St John's, Baltasound	
Shetland	23,167	Brae	
Shetland	23,167	Burra Isle (Bridgend)	
Shetland	23,167	Cullivoe, Yell	
Shetland	23,167	St Columba's, Lerwick	pre-1828
Shetland	23,167	Ollaberry (Northmavine)	
Shetland	23,167	Sandwick	
Shetland	23,167	Scalloway	
Shetland	23,167	St Margaret's, Vidlin (in Meth. Chapel)	
Shetland	23,167	St Paul's, Walls	
Shetland	23,167	Whalsay (Symbister) (in hall)	
Shetland	23,167	(meetings on Fetlar)	
Shetland	23,167	(meetings on Foula)	
Shetland	23,167	(meetings on Out Skerries)	

== Closed, redundant, ruined, abandoned and former churches ==
Church	Founded	Closed
Elgin Cathedral	Medieval	1560
Philorth Church	Medieval	1574
St Magnus, Egilsay	Medieval	
St Olaf's, Kirkwall	Medieval	C17th
Westside Church, Westray	Medieval	post-C17th
Catterline Church	Medieval	1719
Kinnernie Church	Medieval	1743
St Nicholas, Stronsay*	Medieval	C18th
St Peter's, Stronsay*	Medieval	C18th
Orphir Round Church (St Nicholas')	Medieval (1757)	1953
Old St Peter's, Peterhead	Medieval	1771
Kinkell Church	Medieval	1771
St Andrew's, Kirkhill		1783
St Olaf's, Unst	Medieval	1785
Tullich Church	Medieval	1798
Burray Church	Medieval	c. 1800
Foot of Gairn Old Church	Medieval	c. 1805
Forglen Church	Medieval	1806
Forbes Church	Medieval	1808
St Mary's, Auchindoir	Medieval	1810
Dundurcas Church	Medieval	C19th
Cross Church, Sanday	Medieval	C19th
Dalmaik Church, Drumoak	1062	1836
Old King Edward Church	Medieval	1848
Lady Kirk, Westray	Medieval (1674)	1879
St Boniface's, Papa Westray	Medieval	1920
St Ninian's, Oyne	1807	1940
Hoy Church	Medieval	C20th
Lady Church, Sanday	Medieval	C20th
Graemsay Church	Medieval	C20th
Rathen East Church, Gowanhill		C20th?
Savoch Church, Auchnagatt		C20th
Elchies Church		C20th
Archietown Church		C20th
Cabrach Church		C20th
Inverkeithny Church		C20th
Ythan Wells Church		C20th
Blairdaff Old Church		1954
Drainie Old Church	mid-C17th	1950s
Drumoak West Church	1880	1956
Sourin Church, Rousay		1960s
East and Belmont Church, Aberdeen		1972
Deerness Church	Medieval	1974
Kinneff Old Church	1242	1976
Rickarton Church	1871	1979
Culsalmond Church		c. 1980
St Peter's, Sandwick*	Medieval	1984
Boharm Church	Medieval	1987
Urquhart Church	Medieval	1988
Stoneywood Church	1879	1988
Oyne Church, prev. Oyne West Church	1843	1988
Leslie Church	1815	1989
New Byth Church	1794	c. 1990
Ordiquhill Church	1805	1990
Newmill Church		c. 1990
St Andrew's, Tankerness*	Medieval	c. 1990
Premnay Church	1792	1993
Logie Coldstone Church	1618	1993
St John's, Deskford	Medieval	1990s
Dinnet Church		c. 1995
Kincardine O'Neil Church		c. 1995
St Magnus, Birsay	Medieval (1664)	1996
Clatt Church	1799	1996
Pitsligo Church, Peathill	1635 (1890)	1997
St Margaret's, Forgue	Medieval (1821)	1998
Keig Church		1999
Tullynessle Church		1999
Rousay Church	C19th	pre-2013
Cairnie Church	Medieval	c. 2000
Elgin South Church		c. 2000
Cookney Church	1744	2000
Stenness Church	Medieval	c. 2000
St John's, North Walls	1883	2001
Birse Church		c. 2003
Strachan Church		c. 2003
Benholm Church	1832	2004
Garvock Church	1778	2004
Kinellar Church		2004
Corgarff Church		2005
Migvie Church		c. 2005
Foveran Church	Medieval	2006
Glass Church		2007
Cruden West Church	1843	30 Dec 2007
Birsay Church, Twatt*	Medieval	2008
Sandwick Church, Quoyloo	C19th	2008
Cove Church		c. 2010
Kinneff Church	1843	2010
Fordyce Church		2011
Greyfriars John Knox Church, Aberdeen	1532	2011
St Michael's, Harray*	Medieval	2012
Gilcomston Church		2013 (left CoS)
Drumblade Church	Medieval (1773)	c. 2013
Banchory-Devenick Church	Medieval	2013
Glengairn Kirk		2014
Lumphanan Church		2014
Johnshaven Church	1860	2015
Trinity Church, Boddam		2016
Peterhead Old Church		2016
Queen Street Trinity Church, Aberdeen	1844	2017
Fetterangus Church		2018
Uyeasound Church, Unst	1843	2018
Keithhall Church		2018
Middlefield Church		2019
Garthdee Church		2020
Bressay Church	1722	2020
Fair Isle Church		2020
Quarff Church	1830^{TC}	2020
St Ola's, Housabister, Nesting	1794	2020
Weisdale Church	1863	2020
St Magnus, Hamnavoe, Yell	1838	2020
Fetlar Church		2020
Sullom Church, Northmavine		2020
St Ninian's, Bigton		2020
Sand (Sandsting) Church		2020
Hillswick Church, Northmavine		2020
Voe (Delting) Church		2020
Cunningsburgh Church		2020
Dunrossness Church		2020
Foula Church		2020
Skerries Church		2020
Tingwall Church		2020
Sandness Church		2020
Whalsay Church		2020
North Roe Church	1870	c. 2020
Marnoch Old Church, Bridge of Marnoch		2020
Kirk of St Nicholas Uniting, Aberdeen	Medieval	Dec 2020
Evie Church, Stenso*		c. 2020
Northfield Church, Aberdeen		2021
Summerhill Church, Aberdeen	1959	2021
South Church, Stonehaven	1843	2021
Bucksburn Stoneywood Church, Aberdeen	1844	2022
St George's Tillydrone, Aberdeen		2022
Udny Church, Udny Green	Medieval (1821)	2022
Auchaber Church, Aucharnie		2022
St Peter's, Eastside, South Ronaldsay		c. 2022
Rubislaw Church, Aberdeen	1874	2023
Holburn West Church, Aberdeen	1837 (1893)	2023
Ruthrieston West Church, Aberdeen	1872	2023
Woodside Church, Aberdeen		2023
Kingswells Church	1857	2023
St Mark's, Aberdeen	1892	2023
Blairdaff Church	1850	2023
Lumsden Church		2023
Cushnie Church, Leochel Cushnie		2023
Aberluthnott Church, Marykirk	Medieval	2023
Bourtie Church, Kirkton of Bourtie	Medieval	2023
Birnie Kirk	Medieval	19 Nov 2023
St Gerardine's High Church, Lossiemouth	late C19th	31 Dec 2023
Pluscarden Church		2023
Midmar Church	Medieval (1787)	2024
Gulberwick Church	1898	17 Mar 2024
Cluny Church	Medieval (1789)	16 June 2024
Towie Church		2024
Tough Church, Kirkton of Tough		2024
Drumoak Church	Medieval	2024
Barthol Chapel Church	1875	2024
West Church, Fraserburgh		2024
Fraserburgh Old Church	1571	2024
Rathen West Church, Rathen	Medieval	2024
St Andrew's, Tyrie		2024
New Pitsligo Church	1799 (1853)	2024
Sandhaven Church		2024
Enzie Church, Portgordon		2024
Speymouth Church, Mosstodloch		Aug 2024
Elgin High Church	1840s	2024
St John's for Deaf People, Aberdeen^{1}		2024
South St Nicholas Kincorth Church, Aberdeen		2024
King Edward Church	1848	2024
Rathven Church	1794	2024
Durris Church, Kirkton of Durris	Medieval	27 Feb 2025
Botriphnie Church, Drummuir	Medieval	2025
Braemar Church	Medieval	2025
St Mary's, Aberdeen	1939	2025
St Kane's, New Deer		2025
St Cuthbert's, East Calder	Medieval	C17th
Holyrood Abbey (as parish church)	C16th	C18th
Trinity College Kirk, Edinburgh	Medieval	1848
Lady Yester's Kirk	1644	1938
St Cuthbert's Chapel / Buccleuch Church	1756	1969
Newington and St Leonard's Church, Edinburgh	1822	1976
St Thomas', Edinburgh	1831	1979
Highland Tolbooth St John's, Edinburgh	1843	1979
Addiewell Church	1871 (1885)	2000
Stoneyburn Church	1925	2000
Cluny Church, Morningside		2003
Pardovan Church, Philpstoun	1890	c. 2005
Viewforth Church, Edinburgh	1871	2009
St Thomas', Leith		2009
St Columba's, Livingston	1966	2010
St Colm's, Edinburgh		2011
Inverleith Church	1874	2011
St Paul's Ladywell, Livingston	1972	2012
The Lanthorn, Livingston	1970s	2012
St George's West, Edinburgh	1866	2013
Kirk o' Field Church, Edinburgh	1739	2013
St Andrew's Muirhouse, Edinburgh		2014
St James, Portobello		2014
Portobello Old Church	1810	2014
London Road Church, Edinburgh	1876	2016
Stenhouse St Aidan's, Edinburgh		2016
Dean Church, Edinburgh	1830s	2016
St Christopher's Craigentinny		2016
St John's, Oxgangs	1950s	2016
Bristo Memorial Church, Craigmillar		2022
St John's, Bathgate	1895	2023
Greenside Church, Edinburgh	1839	2024
Craigmillar Park Church, Edinburgh	1879	2024
North Leith Church	Medieval	2024
St David's Broomhouse, Edinburgh	1958	2024
St Andrew's Leith, Edinburgh	1881	29 Dec 2024
Kirknewton Church	MPC (1750)	2024
Abercorn Church		2025
St Machan's, Ecclesmachan	Medieval	2025
Willowbrae Church (prev. New Restalrig Church)	1892	2025
Rutherford Church*	Medieval	
Old Jedworth*, Upper Crailing*, Longnewton*, Maxwell*, Roxburgh Holy Sepulchre*, Roxburgh St James*, Mow*, Spital*	Medieval	C16th onwards
Lindean Church	Medieval	C16th
Buccleuch or Rankilburn Church*	Medieval	C16th
Church of St Mary's Loch*	Medieval	c. 1640
Hume Church	Medieval	1640
Lempitlaw Church	Medieval	C17th
St Andrew's Old Church, North Berwick	Medieval	1656
Kailzie Church	Medieval	1674
Hassendean Church	Medieval	1690
Bothans Church	Medieval	1708
Preston Church	Medieval	1718
Dunglass Collegiate Church	Medieval	C18th
Kelso Abbey (as parish church)	Medieval	1771
Nisbet Church	Medieval	pre-C19th
Kilbucho Church	Medieval	1810
Glenholm Church	Medieval	C19th
Abbotrule Church	Medieval	mid-C19th
St Andrew's at Kirk Ports, North Berwick	1664	1883
Fishwick Church	Medieval	1914
Edenside Church, Kelso		1932
North Church, Kelso	1837	1941
Megget Church	Medieval	1948
Nenthorn Church	Medieval	1974
Duns South Church	1762	1976
Trinity North Church, Kelso		1980
Kirkurd Church	Medieval	1985
Mordington Church		1989
Grantshouse Church	1888	c. 1990
Crichton Collegiate Church	Medieval	1992
Drumelzier Church	Medieval	c. 2000
Houndwood Church	1794	2003
Polwarth Church	Medieval	2004
St Aidan's, Galashiels		2005
St Abb's Church		2006
Eckford Church	Medieval	2006
Trinity Church, Jedburgh	1738	2007
Walkerburn Church	1876	2009
Abbey Church, Abbey St Bathans	Medieval	2011
Whitsome Church		2013
Roxburgh Church	Medieval	2015
Smailholm Church	Medieval	2015
Kirkton Church	Medieval	2015
Edgerston Church	1838	2018
Borthwick Church		2019
Burnmouth Church		c. 2019
Whittingehame Church	1722	2020
St Mary's, Whitekirk	Medieval	2021
Glencorse Church		2022
St John's Church, Whitecraig		2022
Penicuik South and Howgate Church		2022
Ladykirk Kirk O'Steil	1500	2022
Westruther Church	1838	2022
Newbattle Church	historic	2023
Newton Church	Built 1742	start of 2023
Swinton Church	Medieval	Easter 2023
Eccles Church		Easter 2023
Garvald Church	Medieval	5 May 2024
Hownam Church	Medieval	2024?
Hoselaw Chapel		2024?
Hutton Church	Medieval	2024
Ednam Church	Medieval	2024
Makerstoun Church	Medieval	2024
Cockenzie and Port Seton Old Church		2024
Ashkirk Church	Medieval	2024
Lasswade Church		2024
St John's, Galashiels	1971	c. 2024
Innerwick Church	MPC (1784)	2024
St Clement's and St Ninian's, Musselburgh		29 Sep 2024
Oldhamstocks Church	MPC	26 Jan 2025
Dalkeith St Nicholas Buccleuch Church	Medieval	15 Jun 2025
Broughton Church	1804	2025
Lyne Church	Medieval	2025
Bedrule Church*	Medieval (1804)	2025
Minto Church*	Medieval	2025
Southdean Church, Chesters*	Medieval	2025
St Cuthbert's, Maxton	Medieval	2025
St Ninian's, Mertoun	Medieval (1652)	2025
Saltoun Church	Medieval	2025
Trinity Church, Galashiels	1742 (1884)	2025
Bolton Church	1810	2025
St Fillan's, Killellan*	Medieval	c. 1775
Helensburgh Old Church	1843	1956
St Bride's, Helensburgh	1867	1981
St Matthew's, Paisley	1907	1988
Ashton Church, Gourock		1989
Dalmuir Overtoun Church	1894	1990
St John's, Paisley	1843	1991
Union Street Church, Greenock	1843	1992
Orr Square Church, Paisley	1843	1994
Greenlaw Church, Paisley	1889	1997
Bearsden North Church	1899	2006
St George's North, Greenock		2007
Castlehead Church, Paisley	1781	2011
Ardgowan Church, Greenock	1793	2011
Old West Kirk, Greenock	1591	2011
St Columba's, Helensburgh	1839	2013
Renfrew Old Church	Medieval	2013
Soulseat Church*	Medieval	C16th
Ettleton, and Wheelkirk	Medieval	C17th
Corrie Church	Medieval	C17th
Sibbaldbie Church	Medieval	C17th
St Fechan's, Ecclefechan	Medieval	C17th
Clayshant Church*	Medieval	C17th
Toskarton or Kirkmadrine Church*	Medieval	C17th
Eggerness or Kirkmadrine Church*	Medieval	C17th
Redkirk Church	Medieval	1675
Longcastle Church*	Medieval	C18th
St Glastian's, Rerrick	Medieval	1866
Ervie Church		1970
St Andrew's (formerly Trinity), Girvan	1870	1973
Chalmers Church, Girvan	1857	1974
Glengarnock Church		1978
Cruggleton Church*	Medieval	c. 1980
St Cuthbert's, Monkton	Medieval	1981
South and Townhead Church, Dumfries		c. 1983
Johnstone Church	Medieval	1980s
Half Morton Church	1744	1992
Tarff Church		1997
Keir Church	Medieval	1997
Tynron Church	Medieval	1997
West High Church, Kilmarnock		2000
Arnsheen Church, Barrhill		2003
Greyfriars Church, Dumfries	1720s	2004
St Andrew's, Stranraer	1898	2004
Lochend Church, Beeswing		c. 2007
Union for Grange Church, Kilmarnock		2009
Lochrutton Church	Medieval	c. 2010
Buittle Church	1808	2010
Kirkbean Church	Medieval	2010
Hoddom Church, Ecclefechan		2010
Kirtlebridge Church		2010
Overton Church, West Kilbride	1794	2010
Trinity Church, Beith	1761	2011
Cummertrees Church	Medieval	2012
Mouswald Church	Medieval	2012
Holywood Church	Medieval	2012
Old High Church, Kilmarnock	1732	2012
Shortlees Church, Kilmarnock	1950	2012
Rerrick Church, Dundrennan	1865	2013
Barony St John's Church, Ardrossan	C17th	2013
Kirkgunzeon Church	Medieval	Oct 2013
St Ninian's, Stranraer	1884	2013
Craigie Church		2014
Balmaghie Church	Medieval	2015
Hightae Church		c. 2015
Ardwell Church	1881	2015
Glencairn Church, Kirkland	Medieval	c. 2016
New Luce Church	1821	2017
Borgue Church		19 Aug 2018
Kilmarnock South Church		c. 2019
Mouswald Church		2020
Bourtreehill Relief Church, Irvine	1773	2020
Glasserton Church	MPC	2020
Kirkmaiden Old Kirk	MPC	2020
Tundergarth Church	1770 (1900)	2020
Kirkpatrick Fleming Church		2022
Eskdalemuir Church	1826	2022
Trinity Church, Stranraer		2022
Dornock Church	1734	2022
Ardeer Church, Stevenston		2022
Lockerbie Dryfesdale Church	1757 (1898)	2023
Monigaff Church	Medieval	2023
St Mungo's, Kettleholm	late C19th	2023
St John's, Largs	1843	24 Sept 2023
Dalton Church		2023
St Kennera's, Kirkinner	MPC	c. 2023
Saltcoats North Church	1836	2023
St Cuthbert's, Saltcoats	Medieval	2023
High Kirk, Stevenston	Medieval	2023
Dalmellington Church	1843	2023
Kirkpatrick Juxta Church, Beattock	Medieval	31 Dec 2023
Ewes Church	1867	2024
Hutton and Corrie Church	Medieval	2024
Applegarth Church, Applegarthtown	Medieval	2024
St John's Onthank, Kilmarnock	building 1956	2024
Riccarton Church, Kilmarnock	Medieval (1823)	2024
St Columba's, Largs	Ancient (1892)	30 June 2024
Corrie Church (Isle of Arran)		2024
Pirnmill Church (Isle of Arran)		2024
Kilmory Church (Isle of Arran)	Medieval	2024
Lamlash (Kilbride) Church (Isle of Arran)	Medieval	2024
St Andrew's, Irvine		2024
Troon Old Church	1830s	2024
South Church, Girvan	1842	2024
Kilbirnie Auld Kirk	MPC	2024
St Mary's Greyfriars, Dumfries	1720s (1837)	2024
Balmaclellan Church	Medieval	2025
Brydekirk		2025
Ayr: St James	1885	2025
Auchincruive (St Quivox)	13th Century	2025
Friockheim Church	1835 (1882)	30 Jun 2024
Strathmartine Church	C18th (1848)	2024
St James, Broughty Ferry	1890	2024
St Luke's (and Queen St), Broughty Ferry	1876	2024
Glendevon Church		2024
Guthrie Kirk	Medieval (1826)	2024
St Margaret's, Forfar		2024
Glenlyon Church, Innerwick	late C18th	2024
Monzie Church		2024
Craigie Church, Perth	1787	2024
Arngask Church, Glenfarg		2024
Rescobie Church		2024
Balgay Church, Dundee	1902	2024
St Marnock's, Fowlis	Medieval	2024
Cleish Church		2024
St Martins Church	Medieval (1842)	23 Feb 2025
Fintry Kirk	Medieval (1823)	2025
Camperdown Church, Dundee		2025
Kincardine-in-Menteith Ch, Blairdrummond	1816	2025
Kilmadock Church, Doune		2025
Portmoak Church, Scotlandwell		2025
Kenmore Church	MPC (1760)	2025
Dalmilling	1953	2025
South and Levern Church, Barrhead	1846	2013
Kilbarchan West Church	Medieval	2015
Park Church, Helensburgh	1863	2015
St James, Paisley		2016
St Cuthbert's, Clydebank		2017
Kilmaronock Old Church	Medieval	2017
St Martin's, Port Glasgow	1944	2019
Jamestown Church	1869	2019
Lochwinnoch Church		2020
St Luke's, Paisley	1830s	2020
St Ninian's Ferguslie, Paisley		2020
Glenburn Church, Paisley	1962	2021
St Ninian's, Larkfield, Greenock	1960	2021
St Columba's Foxbar, Paisley		2023
Duntocher Trinity Church	1836 (1952)	2024
St Andrew's, Dumbarton		2024
West Kirk, Dumbarton	1793	2024
Radnor Park Church, Clydebank	1890s (1960s)	28 Jul 2024
Linwood Church	1860	2024
St Andrew's Trinity, Johnstone		c. 2024
Garelochhead Church		2025
St Machar's Ranfurly, Bridge of Weir	1878	2025
St Columba's, Kilmacolm	1903	c. 2025
Collegiate Church of SS Mary & Anne, Glasgow	Medieval	1940
Queen's Cross Church, Glasgow	pre-1896	1970s
Strathbungo Church	1833	1979
St David's, Glasgow	1720	1983
Dowanhill Church	1865	1984
St Andrew's in the Square	1739	1993
Crosshill Queen's Park Church		2000
Kelvinside Church		2000
Cathcart New Church		2002
Carntyne Old Church	1890	2007
Blackfriars Church, Dennistoun	1876	2007
St Andrew's, Cambuslang		2008
Trinity St Paul's, Cambuslang		2008
Govan Old Church	Medieval	2008
St Kenneth's, Linthouse		2008
Kirkhill Church (Cambuslang Old), Cambuslang		2009
North Kelvinside Church		2010
Mount Florida Church		2010
Martyrs' Church, Townhead		2011
Gardner Street Gaelic Church, Glasgow		2011
St Mary's Drumry, Drumchapel		2011
Castlemilk West Church		2012
St Christopher's, Hillhousewood		2013
South Carntyne Church		2016
Shawlands South Church	1913	2017
Shawlands Old Church	1885	2017
Mosspark Church	1927	2017
Hyndland Church	c. 1880	2017
Anderston Kelvingrove Church, Glasgow		2019
John Ross Memorial Church for Deaf People	1820	2019
Banton Church		2021
Glasgow St Andrew's Penilee		2021
Twechar Church		2022
Stamperland Church, Clarkston	1940	2022
Kildrum Church, Cumbernauld	1962	2022
Rodger Memorial Church, Blairbeth		c. 2022
Balshagray Victoria Park Church	1908	2023
Ruchazie Church		2023
Carmyle Church	1907	2024
Cranhill Church	1954	2024
Yoker Church		2024
Ruchill Kelvinside Church	1903	2024
St Mungo's, Cumbernauld		2024
Kelvin Stevenson Memorial Church (Kelvinbridge P. C.)	1898	2024
Knightswood St Margaret's Church	1925 (1932)	2024
Cathcart Old Church	Medieval	2025
St Thomas, Gallowgate		c. 2013
Lansdowne Church	1863	2014
Shettleston Old Church		2015
Govanhill Trinity Church		2015
Lochwood Church		2015
St Margaret's, Tollcross Park		2016
Linton Church	Medieval	2025
Spynie Church	Medieval	26 April 2026
Arbuthnott Church	1242	31 May 2026
Colston Wellpark	1915	7 June 2026

|} ^{1}united with Aberdeen: Devana and continues to hold meetings as part of that church and parish

== Outwith Scotland ==
=== Presbytery of England ===
- Crown Court Church, London
- St Columba's Church, London
- Corby, St Ninian's
- Jersey, St Columba's
- Guernsey, St Andrew's in the Grange
- Newcastle, St Andrew's
- Liverpool, St Andrew's (dissolved 2017)

=== International Presbytery ===
Session Clerk; Rev. John Cowie BSc B.D. (Minister of English Reformed Church, Amsterdam)

==== Europe ====
- English Reformed Church, Amsterdam (1607)
- English-speaking Christian Congregation, Bochum, Germany
- St Andrew's Church, Brussels (1898) (Vacant as of 18 July 2025)
- St Columba's, Budapest, Hungary
- The Scots Kirk, Lausanne, Switzerland (1874)
- Scots Kirk, Geneva (linked with Lausanne) (Linked charge vacant as of 18 July 2025)
- St Andrew's Church, Lisbon (1866)
- St. Andrew's Scots Church, Valletta, Malta
- The Scots Kirk, Paris
- English Language Congregation, Regensburg, Germany (closed?)
- St Andrew's Church, Rome
- The Scots International Church, Rotterdam (deferred linkage with Paris)
- Church of Scotland, Turin, Italy (closed?)

==== North America ====
- Christ Church in Warwick, Bermuda (1719) (Vacant as of 18 July 2025)
- St Ann's, Port of Spain, Trinidad
- Former: St Andrew's United Church, Toronto (1830–1925)
- Former: St Andrew's Church, Toronto (1876–1925)

==== Asia ====
- St Andrew's Scots Kirk, Colombo, Sri Lanka

=== Presbytery of Jerusalem ===
- St Andrew's Church, Jerusalem (1930)
- St Andrew's Church, Tiberias, Galilee
- Haifa
- Jaffa

== Other Church of Scotland buildings and institutions ==
- Trinity College, Glasgow
- St Mary's College, St Andrews
- New College, Edinburgh
- Christ's College, Aberdeen
- Church of Scotland Offices, 121 George St, Edinburgh
- General Assembly Hall of the Church of Scotland
- St Ninian's Centre, Crieff (now closed)

== Recent sales of church buildings ==
2021 (19): Collessie, Cross Ness Mission Hall, Fair Isle, Fetlar West, Isle of Eigg, Kilchoan, Kirkton of Cults, Lomond Jamestown, Port Glasgow St Martin's, Portsoy, Quarff, Roxburgh, Sand (Shetland), Shetland St Ninian's, Shieldaig, Smailholm, Sullom, Tundergarth, Weisdale

2022 (39): Aberdeen Summerhill, Alvie, Banton, Bargeddie, Barrhead St Andrew's, Carnoch, Dores, Dun, Edderton, Elphin, Eskdalemuir, Falkirk St John's, Glasgow Cranhill, Glasgow Gallowgate, Glencoe St Munda's, Glencorse, Harthill Eastfield, Hillswick, Innellan, Keithhall, Kilberry, Kinnaird, Kirkpatrick Fleming, Ladykirk, Lochailort Mission Hall, Lochwinnoch, Logie Easter, Melness, Monifieth St Rule's, Newbattle, Paisley North, Paisley St Luke's, Paisley St Ninian's Ferguslie, Sandness, The Glens & Kirriemuir United St Andrew's, Udny Green, West Lochfyneside, Westruther, Whitekirk

2023 (45): Auchaber, Bengairn Parishes, Brechin Cathedral, Catrine, Coatbridge Calder, Cunningsburgh North, Daviot & Dunlichity, Dornock, Dulnain Bridge, Dundee St David's, Dunross Ness, Edinburgh Bristo Memorial, Elgol, Ewes, Foveran North, Glasgow Cranhill, Glasgow Queen's Park Govanhill, Glasgow St Columba, Glasserton, Greenock Old West, Gulberwick, Innerwick, Inverkeithing, Inverness Old High, Kilfinan, Kilmarnock Riccarton, Kilspindie & Rait, Kirkinner, Lunna St Margaret's, Monigaff, Mull St Ernan's, Musselburgh St John's, Oldhamstocks, Penicuik South, St Mungo, Scone St Martin's, Shetland St Magnus, Skerries, Stamperland, Stracathro, Strathkinness, Strontian, Twechar, Voe, Whalsay

2024 (80): Aberdeen Holburn West, Aberdeen Kingswell, Aberdeen Rubislaw, Aberdeen Ruthrieston West, Aberdeen Woodside, Ardfern, Arngask, Avoch, Balgay, Barthol St Katherine's, Blairdaff, Bolton, Bourtie, Bucksburn & Stoneywood, Burnside Blairbeth, Campbeltown Highland, Caol, Carestone, Cluny, Coatbridge Old Monkland, Colintraive, Corby St Andrew's, Cowal High, Creich, Crieff St Michael's, Cromarty, Cullen, Cushnie, Dairsie, Dalarossie, Dalavich, Dalmellington, Dundee Camperdown, Dundee Craigiebank, Dysart St Clair, Fearn Abbey, Fern, Flotta, Fogo, Garvald, Glasgow Hyndburn, Greenock St Ninian's, Hoy St Columba's, Hutton, Inverness Inshes East, Inverness Trinity, Kemback, Kilchrenan, Kilmeny, Kincardine (Carrbridge), Kincardine (nr Edderton), Kirknewton, Kirkpatrick Juxta, Lasswade, Lismore, Marykirk, Maule Memorial, Midmar, Monikie, Morham, Murroes, Onthank St John's, Paisley West, Paxton, Peterhead Muckle Kirk, Petty East, Portnahaven, Rathven, St Andrew's Lhanbryd, Saltoun, Sanday Cross, Stonehaven South, Strathmiglo, Swinton, Templehall, Thornton, Thrumster (Wick), Tough, Trinity Gask, Urray

2025: Abercorn, Aberdeen Kirk of St Nicholas, Aberdeen St Nicholas South of Kincorth, Alness, Applegarth, Arbirlot, Arisaig, Ashkirk, Blackbraes & Shieldhill, Blackness, Botriphine, Braemar, Broughton, Buckhaven, Carriden, Cathcart Old, Cleland, Clydebank Radnor Park, Cockenzie Old, Colliston, Corrie (Arran), Corrimony, Cortachy, Crianlarich, Drumoak, Dryfesdale, Dumbarton St Andrew's, Dumfries St Mary's, Dundee Camperdown, Dundee North East Whitfield, Dundee Stobswell, Dunfermline Kingseat, Dunfermline Townhill, Durris, East Kilbride South, Edinburgh Craigmillar Park, Edinburgh St David's Broomhouse, Edinkillie, Elgin High, Enzie, Ewes, Evie, Findhorn, Friockheim, Garelochhead, Glasgow Carmyle, Glasgow Kelvinbridge, Glasgow Knightswood St Margaret, Glasgow Ruchazie, Guthrie (near Forfar), Hutton & Corrie, Kilmory (Arran), Kincardine-in-Menteith, King Edward, Kirkfieldbank, Knockbain, Laggan, Lamlash, Lasswade, Lemreway, Lesmahagow Old, Libberton & Quothquan, Lossiemouth St Gerardine's, Lumsden, Lyne, Maxton, Mertoun, Monimail, Monzie, Muiravonside, New Deer St Kane's, New Pitsligo, Newton (near Dalkeith), Panbride, Perth Craigie, Portmoak, Rescobie, Speymouth, Stirling Viewfield, Strathmartine, Struy, Towie, Traquair, Trossachs, Tyrie, West Gordon Noth, Windygates

2026: Aberdeen Northfield, Aberdeen St George's Tillydrone, Airth, Arbuthnott, Auldearn, Ayr St Andrew's, Bedrule, Bellshill West, Bettyhill, Bo'ness St Andrew's, Bothkennar & Carronshore, Braes of Rannoch, Bridge of Weir St M's Ranfurly, Broughty Ferry St James, Broughty Ferry St Luke's & Queen St, Buchanan (Loch Lomond), Bunilidh, Bute Trinity, Carnbee, Caputh, Cawdor, Cleish, Clunie, Colintraive, Corsock, Coull, Cowdenbeath Crossgates, Craigellachie, Craigneuk & Belhaven (Motherwell), Culross, Cumbernauld Kildrum, Dalkeith St Nicholas Buccleuch, Dalton, Dunbeath, Dundee Balgay, Faifley & Duntocher, Durisdeer, Edinburgh Greenside, Edinburgh Willowbrae, Falkirk Bainsford, Falkirk Camelon, Fallin, Fintry, Fisherton, Forfar St Margaret's, Forres: St Laurence, Fraserburgh Old, Fraserburgh West, Gairbraid, Galashiels St John's, Gartocharn, Girvan South, Glasgow: Balshagray Victoria Park, Glasgow: Ibrox Old, Glasgow: St Christopher's Priesthill & Nitshill, Glenbervie, Glendevon, Glenshee, Grangemouth: Abbotsgrange, Gretna: Old, Haddington: West, Haggs, Hawick: St Mary's Old, Hownam, Inveravon, Irvine St Andrew's, Kenmore, Kilbirnie Auld, Killearnan, Kirkmaiden Old, Kirkmichael (Glenshee), Larbert West, Largs St Columba's, Leith North, Linton, Linwood, Loudoun, Minto, Musselburgh St Clement's & St Ninian's, Paisley Glenburn, Rafford, Rathven West, Rayne, Reay, Ruthven (Isla Parishes), St Andrew's (North Coast), St Callan's (Sutherland), St Colmon, St Monan's, Saltcoats North, Sandhaven, Southdean, Spynie, Stenhouse & Carron, Stevenston Ardeer, Strathbrock St Machan's, Stow, Symington, Syre, Troon Old, Wamphray, Watten, Wick St Fergus, Wishaw Old, Yoker

== Resources ==
- Vacant charges
- Church buildings
- Mission plans: Edinburgh and West Lothian Glasgow Clyde Forth Valley and Clydesdale Lothian and Borders South West Fife Perth North East and Northern Isles Cleir Eilean I Lewis
- Obsolete congregation names: 2025 2024 2017
- The Ancient Church in the North of Scotland

== See also ==
- List of Church of Scotland synods and presbyteries
- St Andrew's Garrison Church, Aldershot (affiliated garrison church)
- List of Free Church of Scotland congregations
- List of civil parishes in Scotland
