= St Athernase Church =

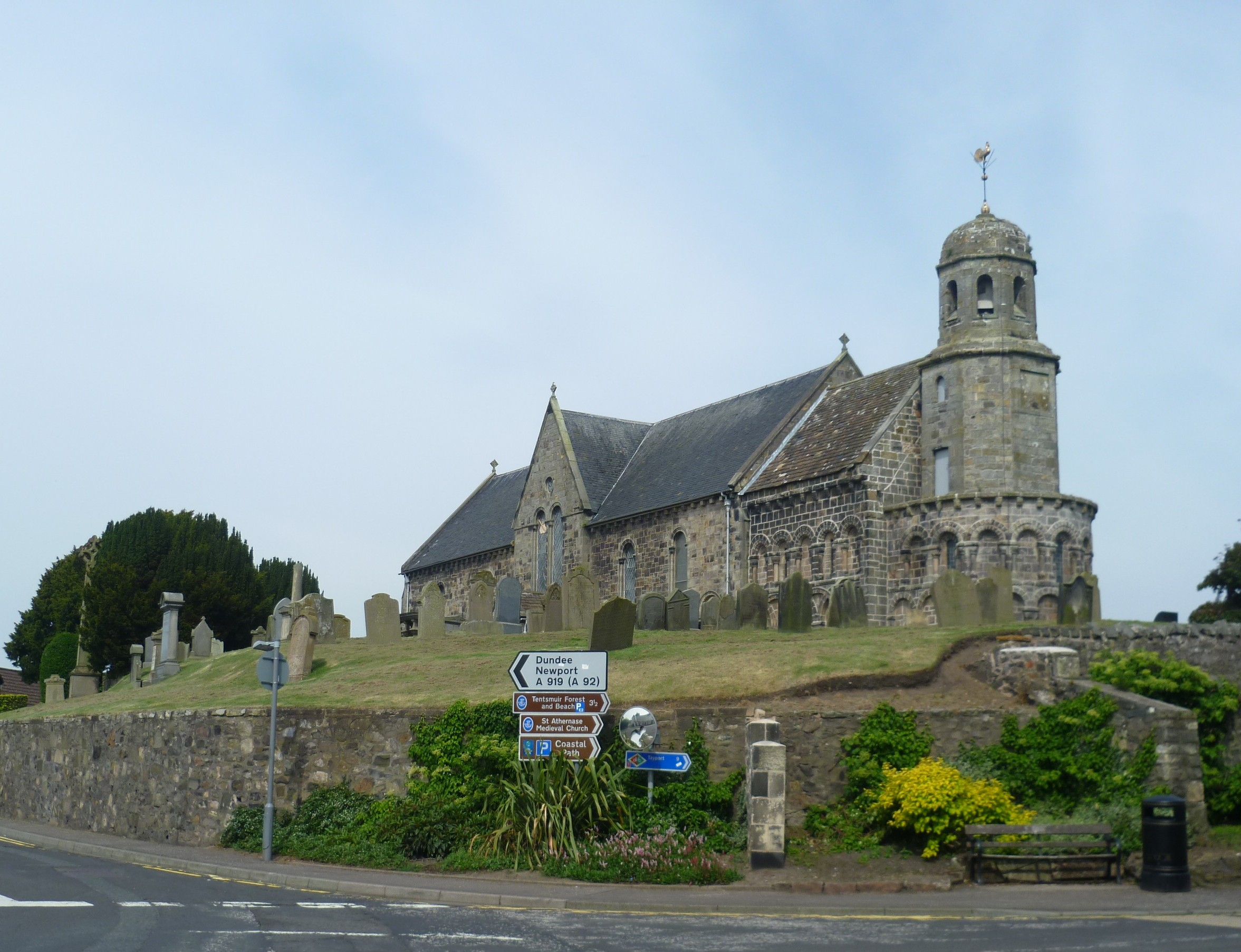
- St Athernase Church
- 56.38263°N 2.88417°W
- Location: Main Street, Leuchars
- Country: Scotland
- Denomination: Church of Scotland
- Website: "Leuchars St Athernase". Archived from the original on 11 August 2018.

Administration
- Parish: Leuchars

St Athernase Church is a Romanesque church located in Leuchars, Fife, Scotland. It is a Category A listed building and remains in use as a Church of Scotland parish church.

The chancel and half-round apse date from the 12th century with the exterior featuring blind arcades with typical Norman arches. The church was granted by Ness son of William, Lord of Leuchars, to the canons of St Andrews in 1185. Around 1700 a belfry was added, and in 1858 restoration was carried out to the nave.

The church is open to the public in summer, at other times by arrangement. Relics preserved inside include part of a 9th-century cross-slab found near the village (closely comparable to the large collection at St Andrews Cathedral), and three elaborate 16th century memorial stones of the Bruces of Earlshall, the local lairds. One of the latter shows a full length figure of a woman, naïve in execution, but valuable in documenting contemporary dress.

The oft-mentioned dedication of the medieval church of Leuchars to St Athernase is actually an error. It arises from a nineteenth-century misreading of a list of church dedications in the Register of St Andrews Priory, a medieval manuscript now in the National Archives of Scotland. Folio 155v. has a list of churches dedicated, or re-dedicated, by bishop David de Bernham of St Andrews in the 1240s. The eighth church in this list is 'ecclesia sancti Johannis euangeliste et sancti Athernisci confessoris de Losceresch (the church of St John the evangelist and St Athernase the confessor). However the church of Losceresch is not the church of Leuchars, which in medieval sources is spelt Lochris, Locres etc., but the parish church of Lathrisk (now Kettle parish in Fife), whose early spellings are Losresc (1170s), Loseresch, Losseresc (1227) and such like. Athernase is the patron saint not of Leuchars but of Lathrisk.

The patron of Leuchars is not known for certain, but some medieval sources indicate a local cult of St Bonoc, a name unknown outside the parish of Leuchars, and a chapel of St Bonoc, complete with chaplain, is known to have existed.

"Athernase" may be an anglicised form of the name Itharnán, found also in Fife at Kilrenny, and on the Isle of May, an Irish missionary who "died among the Picts" in 669 according to the Annals of Ulster.

== See also ==
- List of Church of Scotland parishes
