= Baillieston St Andrew's Church =

- Baillieston St Andrew's Parish Church
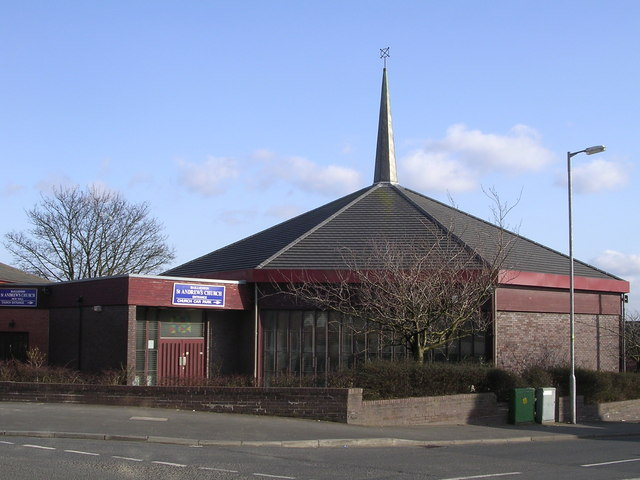
- Baillieston St Andrew's Church
- 55.850°N 4.107°W
- Location: Glasgow
- Country: Scotland
- Denomination: Church of Scotland
- Churchmanship: Presbyterian, Reformed
- Website: Church Website

History
- Status: Active
- Dedicated: December 1974

Architecture
- Functional status: Parish church

Administration
- Parish: Baillieston

Baillieston St Andrew's Church is a congregation of the Church of Scotland, a member of the Presbyterian Church. The church building is located on the corner of Bredisholm Road and Muirhead Road, Baillieston, Glasgow, Scotland. The church today serves the town of Baillieston.

== History ==
The congregation of Baillieston St Andrew's was established in November 1966, by the union of the Baillieston Old Parish and Rhinsdale Churches.

=== Baillieston Parish Church ===
The origins of Baillieston Parish Church go back to the late 1820s when George Scott of Daldowie donated a site on Crosshill Farm for the building of a church, to be known as the Crosshill Chapel of Ease, and provision of a cemetery for the village. Plans were prepared and building proceeded; the first church in Scotland under the First Church Extension Scheme of the Church of Scotland. The church in Church Street, Crosshill (now closed) cost £507 to build and was opened on 7 July 1833 with seating for 500. Prior to this the only church in the area was Old Monkland Parish Church. The first minister was the Rev. Andrew Gray who as a probationer of the Church also taught in the local school. He remained as minister until the Disruption in 1843 when he was called to be minister at Dumbarton. Over the next 123 years Baillieston Parish Church had a further six ministers until the union with Rhinsdale Church in 1966.

In June 1967 Rev. John J.C. Owen, took up his first charge at Baillieston Old Parish Church where he remained until December 1979, a period of twelve years. During his ministry a fund for the building of a new church was started and with the generosity of the congregation and members of the public, sufficient money was collected over some years to allow the building of the new church to proceed. The "Old Church" had served its purpose well, having been in constant use for about 140 years, but was now in need of almost continual and costly maintenance. This, coupled with the closure of Rhinsdale Church whose congregation had united with the "Old Church" in November 1966 causing a very considerable increase in its membership, made it necessary to build a new church.

=== Baillieston Parish Church War Memorial ===
The War Memorial to those who had fallen in the 1914-18 war was extended to include the names of those who gave their lives in the 2nd World War, 1939–45, and on Sunday, 15 April 1951 an Unveiling and Dedication Service was held. The Rev. Roy McVicar officiated. The memorial was unveiled by William Reid (VC). who also gave the address to a very full church. Other gifts were given by members of the congregation and these included a full suite of chairs for the choir along with a special chair in keeping with the design of the Communion chairs as a memorial.

=== Rhinsdale Parish Church ===
Rhinsdale Church, originally known in Baillieston as the U.P. Kirk (United Presbyterian) was first started by a number of people from Baillieston and district in March 1862. They met for services at school building at Fauldshill known as a preaching U.P. Church, getting their preachers from the U.P. Presbytery of Glasgow. James Hunter, a Glasgow merchant, who lived in Rhinsdale House then, and in all probability owned Fauldshill where the old school stood, was one who was responsible for the beginning of the congregation.

While the early members were using the school they resolved to have a church of their own and began to collect subscriptions for this purpose. In due course, with their subscriptions, plus assistance from the U.P. Building Fund and the Ferguson Bequest Fund, they had a total of £1,200. A site which latterly became well known in Baillieston was chosen. It was given to the church by James Beaumont Neilson, the inventor of hot blast which revolutionised iron smelting in Coatbridge in the 1830s. By October 1863 construction of the buildings was well ahead so the members, 81 of them, petitioned the Glasgow Presbytery of the U. P. Church for permission to form a congregation of the U.P. Church in Baillieston. This was granted and in January 1864 the U.P. Church in Baillieston was born. It was opened for worship on 17 February 1864. The new buildings were the church and at the rear the Session House and Vestry and above a small hail.

It was almost five months later before the new congregation called its first minister. He was the Rev. John Mcintyre and he was ordained on 1 June 1865. Over the next 100 years Rhinsdale Church had a further eight ministers until the union with Baillieston Old Parish Church in 1966.

Rhinsdale Church War Memorial: Many men from the Rhinsdale congregation saw active service, sixteen of them being killed in action. Their names were inscribed on a memorial plaque incorporated in the Communion Table.

== The new church ==
The congregation of Baillieston St Andrew's was established in November 1966, by the union of the Baillieston Old and Rhinsdale Churches. The new congregation appointed its first minister, the Rev John Owen in June 1967. During the first seven years of his ministry the Rev Owen worked with his congregation to plan and oversee the building of a new church building to replace the "Old" parish church. The new church was dedicated in December 1974.

== Ministers ==
=== Baillieston Old Parish Church ===
- Rev Andrew Gray (1833–1843)- First minister of Baillieston Parish Church
- Rev Matthew Graham (1843–1855)- Rev Graham was called from Calton Church
- Rev Hugh Ramsay (1856–1892)- called from Gartmore - during his ministry the seating accommodation was extended and a manse built.
- Rev Dr Alexander Andrew (1892–1940)- Mr Andrew was the longest serving minister in Baillieston (48 years). He had been an Assistant to Mr Ramsay.
- Rev Adrian G. Watt (1941–1948)- Rev Watt came from Aberdeen, he was called to St. Michael's Parish Church, Edinburgh
- Rev Roy McVicar (1949–1955)- Mr McVicar had been a missionary in Africa before coming to Baillieston Old Parish Church. He was called to Davidson Mains Church, Edinburgh
- Rev Cameron Walker (1956–1966)- Rev Walker was called from Tynecastle Church, Edinburgh

=== Rhinsdale Church ===
- Rev James McIntyre (1865–1871)- Rev McIntyre left to become a missionary in North China.
- Rev Alexander McLean (1872–1982)
- Rev Wm Yule (1883–1890)- Mr Yule left to take up a post in South Africa
- Rev John Gray (1891–1916)- died suddenly while still in post
- Rev Wm Brown (1916–1924)- was ordained in 1916 and soon after was granted leave of absence to become Chaplain to 1st/8th Royal Scots in France. On his return in 1919 he resumed his ministry at Rhinsdale until 1924 when he left to take up another ministry at St. George's Presbyterian Church, Southport, Lancashire
- Rev J.S. Crichton (1925–1930)- Mr Crichton was called to High Carntyne and later retired to Aberdeen
- Rev Robert Inglis (1931–1958)- his term of office was the longest in the history of this church. He came from the Martins Memorial Church in Stornoway, although he previously held charges in Forth, Midlothian, Carnoustie and Kilchattan Bay
- Rev John A Beattie (1958–1960)- Rhinsdale was only allowed to call a minister on a short-term basis, so the Rev Beattie came from a charge in Orkney to Rhinsdale, Baillieston in 1958 and remained for only about 2 years when he received a call to St. James Church of Scotland, Dulwich, London
- Rev Wm Martin (1960–1964) - Rhinsdale Church was linked to Kenmuir Mount Vernon Church where Mr Martin was the Minister

=== Baillieston St Andrew's Church ===
- Rev J.J.C. Owen (1967–1979) - Was the first minister of the newly formed St Andrew's Church and oversaw the building of the new church.
- Rev Tom C Houston (1980–2000)- Was a popular evangelical minister at Baillieston St Andrew's - he was previously the minister at St Andrew's Church, Jerusalem
- Rev Robert Gehrke (2001–2006) - Was minister for 5 years, he was called to Blackridge linked with St Andrew's, Harthill
- Rev Alisdair T MacLeod-Mair (2007–2011) - Alisdair was called to Baillieston St Andrew's Church from Bonnybridge: St Helen's Church as Parish Minister in 2007 and demitted in 2011.
- Rev Malcolm Cuthbertson (2012-2017) - Malcolm was introduced as Minister of the new linkage between Baillieston: Mure Memorial Church and Baillieston: St Andrew's Church at a service on 25 June 2013.
- Rev Fiona Morrison (2024 - date) - Fiona was inducted as the minister of linked churches (Mure Memorial and Baillieston St Andrew's) on 13 June 2024.

== See also ==
- List of Church of Scotland parishes
- Location: 2 Bredisholm Road, Baillieston, Glasgow, G69 7HL at grid reference NS681638
