= St Nicholas' Cardonald Church =

- St Andrew & St Nicholas Parish Church
- St Nicholas' Cardonald Church
- 55°51′07″N 4°21′30″W
- Location: Glasgow
- Country: Scotland
- Denomination: Church of Scotland
- Website: Parish Website

History
- Status: Active
- Dedication: Saint Nicholas
- Dedicated: 25 November 1937

Architecture
- Functional status: Parish church
- Architect: James Miller
- Architectural type: Church
- Completed: 1937

Administration
- Parish: St Andrew & St Nicholas

The Parish Church of Saint Nicholas, also known as St Nicholas' Cardonald, is a 20th century Parish church of the Church of Scotland, located in the Hillington and Cardonald areas of Glasgow.

== History of the Building and Congregation ==
St Nicholas' was designed by James Miller, and built in the 1930s. It was built of bricks, with pillars and round arches. It was completed in 1937, and was dedicated on 25 November 1937. Initially, church membership low, but by 1947, membership amounted to over a thousand, and by 1962 to nearly two thousand.

In 2015, the congregations of Penilee St Andrew and St Nicholas' united to form one parish named St Andrew and St Nicholas, with both churches still in use.
