= St Catherine's Argyle Church =

St. Catherine's Argyle
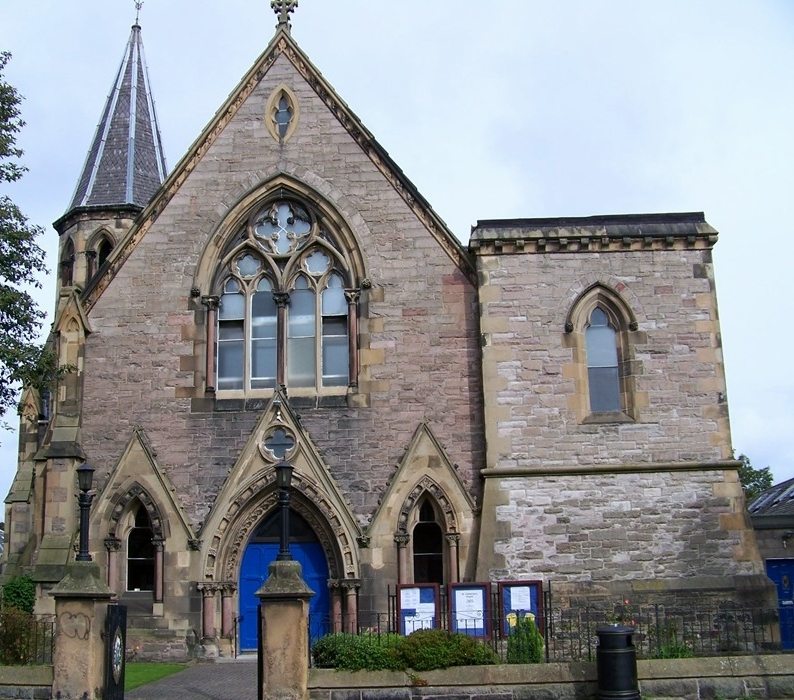

- Location within the City of Edinburgh council area

Religion
- Affiliation: Church of Scotland
- Region: Scotland
- Status: extant

Location
- Location: The Grange, Edinburgh
- Municipality: Edinburgh
- Coordinates: 55.9357°N 3.1903°W

Website
- St Catherine's Argyle Church, Edinburgh

St. Catherine's Argyle, or St. Cath's, is a Church of Scotland church located in the Grange, Edinburgh. The Scottish churchman and poet Horatius Bonar was its first minister. The present St Catherine's Argyle congregation was formed in 1968 from the union of two local churches - St Catherine's in the Grange (originating in 1861 as Chalmers Memorial Free Church) and the Argyle Place United Presbyterian Church (itself originally formed in April 1877).

The present building is that which was built by Chalmers Memorial Church, which first opened its doors on 6 December 1866. Built of grey stone, with several pink granite pillars, a proposed steeple to the East of the building was never completed, though the interior of the building has been repeatedly modernised. Most notably so in the early late 1960s when the union of St Catherine's with Argyle Place was completed. Initially plans would have seen the current St Catherine's building remodelled as halls for the church, with the Argyle Place church functioning as the main centre of worship. A devastating fire at the Argyle Place Church building, however, saw the St Catherine's building established as the ongoing centre of worship, though the building still also remains a busy hub of community bookings to this day.

In April 2008 the Rev. Victor Laidlaw retired after a 33 year long ministry to the congregation and parish.

The present minister is the Rev. Stuart Irvin.
