= Kingcase Parish Church =

Church in Preswick, Scotland

Coordinates: 55.48553°N 4.61577°W

- Kingcase Parish Church
- Denomination: Church of Scotland
- Churchmanship: Kirk Session
- Website: Kingcase

Administration
- Parish: Prestwick

Kingcase Parish Church is located in South Prestwick, South Ayrshire, Scotland. It is a parish church in the Church of Scotland, within the presbytery of Ayr.

The building dates from 1912, and is in red sandstone. The modern history of the church begins immediately after the Union of the Churches in 1929 which brought the four churches in Prestwick together within the Church of Scotland. A new congregation was formed in what was the New Prestwick mission hall of St Nicholas Church. This congregation was recognised as Prestwick Kingcase Church in 1934, becoming a parish church in 1950. The church was extended in 1956, and three of its stained-glass windows date from this decade.
