= Pollokshields Parish Church =

Pollokshields Church
- Pollokshields Parish Church
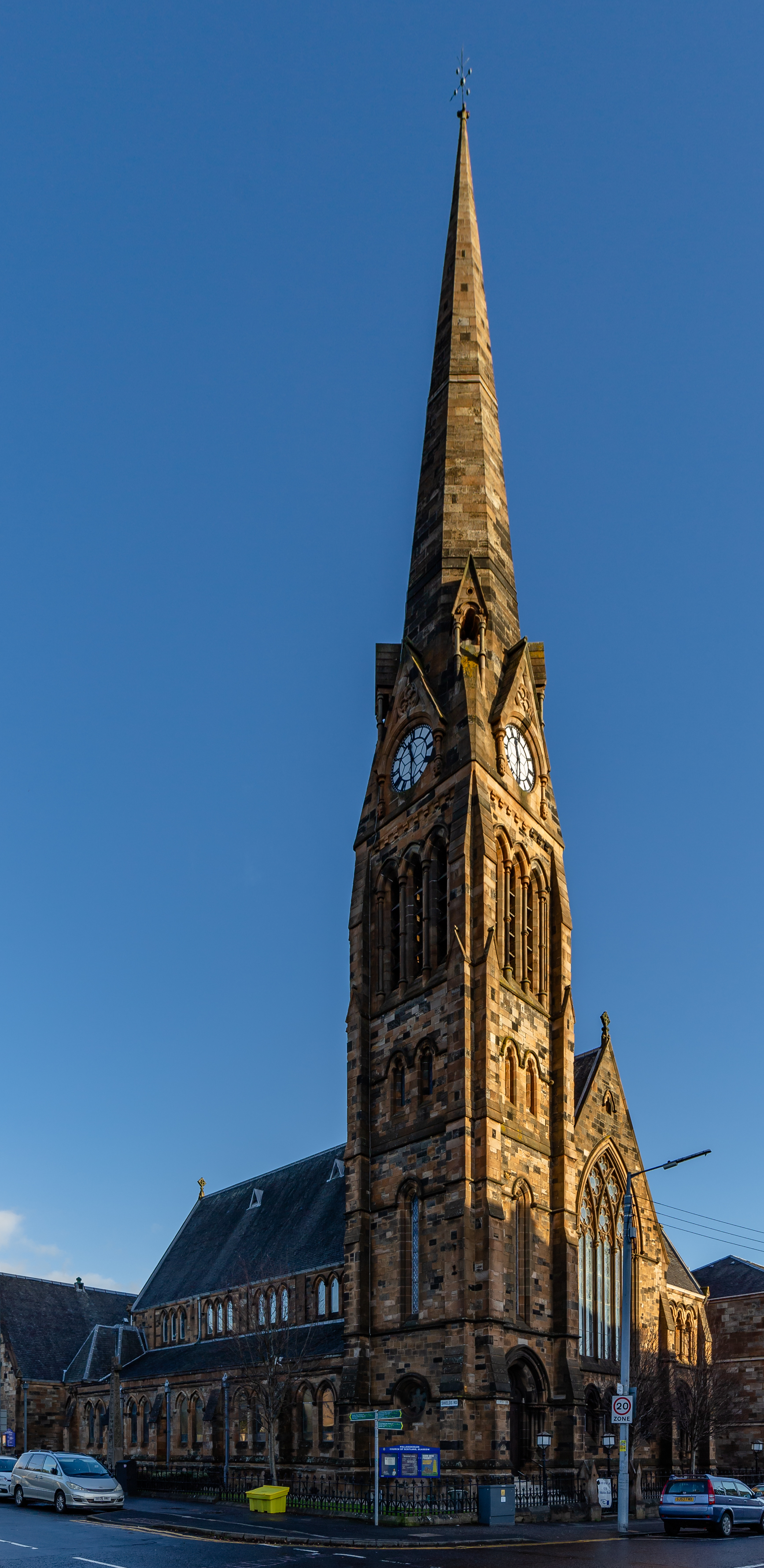
- Pollokshields Church
- 55°50′35″N 4°16′33″W
- Location: Glasgow
- Country: Scotland
- Denomination: Church of Scotland
- Website: Church Website

History
- Former name: Pollokshields Established Church
- Status: Active

Architecture
- Functional status: Parish church
- Architect: Robert Baldie
- Architectural type: Church
- Style: Neo-Gothic
- Years built: 1874–1875
- Groundbreaking: 19 May 1877
- Completed: 19 May 1878
- Construction cost: £14,000

Specifications
- Capacity: 1000 people
- Length: 90 ft (27 m)
- Height: 60 ft (18 m)

Administration
- Parish: Pollokshields-Titwood

Listed Building – Category B
- Designated: 15 December 1970
- Reference no.: LB33477

Pollokshields Parish Church is a 19th-century parish church of the Church of Scotland, named after the Pollokshields area of Glasgow, Scotland.

== History ==
The Pollokshields congregation was established in 1875, with worship taking place in the church hall, which was opened on 10 October 1875. It was only on 19 May 1877 that the foundation stone was laid by Sir William Stirling Maxwell, Chancellor of the University of Glasgow. The church building was completed by 1878, when the church became a Quoad sacra parish on 5 March 1878 and named Pollokshields Established Church. The church was officially opened on 19 May 1878. The church was remodelled in 1913, when the church and hall were repainted and relighted, while the chancel was paved with marble. During renovation, and until the church was reopened on 7 September 1913, the congregation worshipped in Titwood Parish Church.

The Titwood congregation and the Pollokshields congregation united to form Pollokshields-Titwood Parish Church on 15 June 1941. The Pollokshields building was chosen as parish church, while Titwood Church was dismantled, moved and rebuilt in Pollok becoming St James' (Pollok) Parish Church.

== Architecture ==
The church was built in the Neo-Gothic style on designs by Robert Baldie. A centre gable of was built at a height of 18 metres, with a carved finial. A steeple was built at the southwest corner, rising to a height of nearly 55 metres. The tower has a clock face on each of its four sides. The south (entrance) front has a large geometrical window above a row of trefoil headed windows with stiff leaf capitals. The side aisles have twin lancet windows beneath the clerestory of triple lancet windows to the main church. The interior has aisle arcades formed by polished granite columns on high octagonal sandstone bases with French Gothic capitals supporting pointed arches beneath the clerestory windows and the high scissor braced roof trusses. Each column cap is different. The timber roof of the side aisles and the main trusses add to the grandeur of the interior. The south balcony is reached by a staircase from the east porch.

== Works of Art ==
A total of 25 stained glass windows adorn the church, dedicated on 24 December 1889. These were the work of Stephen Adam, W & J J Keir and Robert Anning Bell. A brass lectern with an eagle mounted on a ball swivel, was also dedicated on 24 December. During the 1913 renovations, a new organ by Harrison & Harrison replaced the old Conacher organ. The organ is divided and enclosed in a carved oak case with the console detached. It contains three manuals and pedals and had thirty speaking stops and nine couplers. A War Memorial honouring the 34 men connected to the church who had died during WWI, was unveiled on 30 October 1921.
