= Ervie =

Village in Dumfries and Galloway, Scotland

Coordinates: 54.964°N 5.130°W

Ervie - or in Scottish Gaelic: An Eirbhe - is a hamlet in Dumfries and Galloway, Scotland, in the Rhins of Galloway, just outside Stranraer.
