= St Nicholas Parish Church, Lanark =

St Nicholas Parish Church
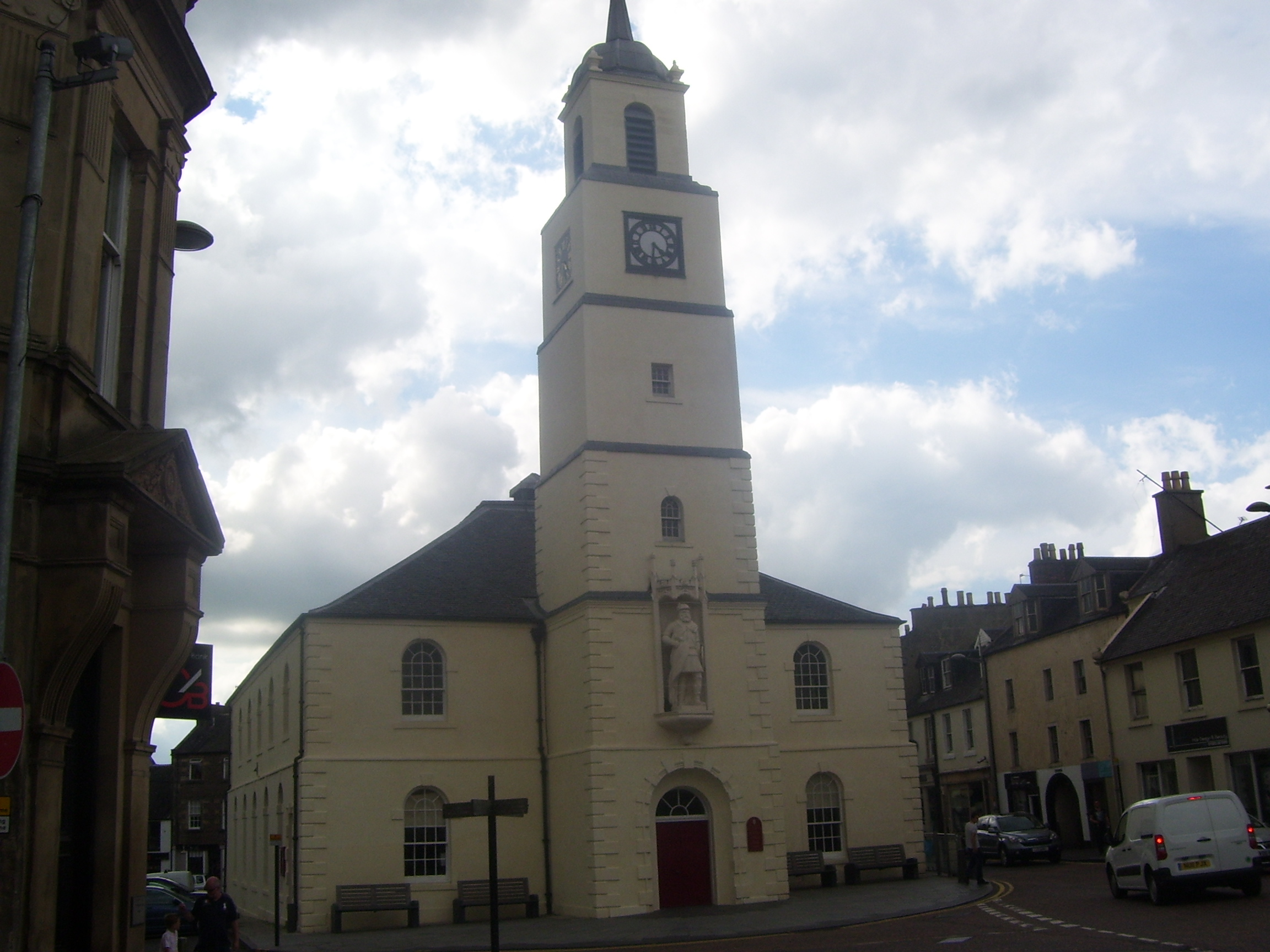
- St Nicholas Church, as viewed from Lanark town centre.

- Location within South Lanarkshire
- 55°40′24.8″N 3°46′48.5″W
- OS grid reference: NS 88127 43668
- Location: High Street; Lanark; South Lanarkshire
- Country: Scotland
- Denomination: Church of Scotland
- Website: lanark-stnicholas.co.uk

History
- Status: Parish church
- Founded: 13th Century

Architecture
- Functional status: Active
- Heritage designation: Category B Listed Building
- Designated: 7 May 1980
- Architect: John Reid
- Years built: 1774 (Current Building)

St Nicholas Parish Church is a category B listed building and Church of Scotland place of worship in the town centre of Lanark, South Lanarkshire, Scotland.

The original 13th-century chapel was documented as early as 1890, however at that time it was claimed that there were no remnants of that building. A survey in the 1990s conducted by the Lanark and District Archaeological Society was able to find artefacts dating back to the 13th century, as well as 16th century pillars believed to have been constructed by Thomas Twaddle in 1571. Sources also reported evidence of the chapel's continued use in the medieval period and post-Reformation.

Over the front entrance is an eight-foot-tall (approximately 2.4 meters) statue of William Wallace. This dates back to the early 19th century and was sculpted by Robert Forrest.

In 2004, the remains of a well were found on the former grounds of the church during a routine ground breaking. There is documentation of the well's existence dating back to 1662; it was found in what is now Bloomgate, close to the church building, and was filled in after being drained and recorded.

The church has had many ministers over the years, but has been left without a resident minister since 30 November 2014, when the incumbent Rev Alison Meikle left for Grangemouth Zetland.

The church is the centre of the annual Whuppity Scoorie tradition.
