= St James' (Pollok) Parish Church =

St James' Church
- St James' Pollok Parish Church
- St James' Church
- 55°50′04″N 4°20′54″W
- Location: Glasgow
- Country: Scotland
- Denomination: Church of Scotland

History
- Former name: Titwood Parish Church
- Status: Active

Architecture
- Functional status: Parish church
- Architect: Henry Edward Clifford
- Architectural type: Church
- Style: Neo-Gothic
- Years built: 1893–1895

Administration
- Parish: Pollok

Listed Building – Category B
- Designated: 15 December 1970
- Reference no.: LB33601

St James' Parish Church is a 19th-century parish church of the Church of Scotland in the Pollok area of Glasgow.

== History ==
The church was originally built as the Titwood Parish Church of Pollokshields, but was dismantled, transported and rebuilt in Pollok between 1951 and 1953, and then renamed St James'. The church was originally built between 1893 and 1895 in Glencairn Drive, Pollokshields. It was built in the Neo-Gothic cruciform style, designed by Henry Edward Clifford. Thomson, McCrea and Sanders were the architects responsible for the dismantling and rebuilding of the church in a different location. Prior to the move, the Titwood congregation had united with the Pollokshields congregation in 1941, rending the former Titwood Parish Church redundant. During the rebuilding, the new Pollok congregation, worshipped in a school hall and then in a wooden hut. The church was reopened on 3 September 1953.
