= Prestwick South Parish Church =

Church in South Ayrshire, Scotland

Coordinates: 55.49942°N 4.61116°W

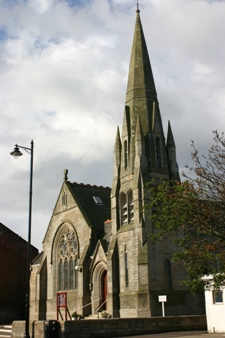
- Prestwick South Parish Church
- Denomination: Church of Scotland
- Churchmanship: Kirk Session
- Website: Prestwick South Parish Church

Administration
- Parish: Prestwick

Prestwick South Parish Church is located in South Prestwick, South Ayrshire, Scotland. It is a Parish Church in the Church of Scotland and within the Presbytery of Ayr. It is a category B listed building.

== Ministers ==
There have been several ministers at Prestwick South.

- Rev. Kenneth C. Elliott (1989–2024)
- Rev. Thomas Barr Girwood (1981–1988)
- Rev. Jack Brown (1976–1980)
- Rev. James Burgoyne Yorke (1947–1976)
- Rev. George Adam Theodore Napier Christie (1935–1947)
- Rev. Alexander Gibson (1912–1934)
- Rev. Robert Alexander Cameron MacMillan (1909–1910)
- Rev. Ernest Finlay Scott (1895–1908)
- Rev. Archibald Alison (1882–1900)

== Union ==
In April 2025 Prestwick South Church united with the nearby Monkton & Prestwick North Church and the new congregation will now be known as Monkton & Prestwick Trinity Church.

There is currently no minister and the congregation are starting the search for a new minister.
