= Clan Fletcher =

Scottish clan

- Mac-An-Leister (Son of the Arrowmaker) Fleisdear
- Motto: Recta Pete (Seek for Right Things)

Profile
- Country: Scotland, Ireland, England
- Region: Scottish Highlands
- District: Argyll
- Ethnicity: Scottish
- Clan Fletcher no longer has a chief, and is an armigerous clan
- Historic seat: Achallader Castle
Allied clans
Clan MacGregor Clan Stewart
Rival clans
Clan Campbell

Clan Fletcher is a Scottish clan which is officially recognized by the Lord Lyon King of Arms. It is considered an armigerous clan since the clan no longer has a chief recognized by the Lord Lyon.

== History ==
=== Origins of the name ===
The name Fletcher is derived from the French word flechier, which means arrow maker. The first record of the name was from Jean de la Flèche, a Norman noble who was given land by William the Conqueror. His descendant later moved to Scotland. The name was a very common trade name, so much so that it became used in the Scottish Gaelic language as fleisdear. In the eighteenth century some families went full circle and anglicised the name from the Gaelic, Mac-an-leistear, back into Fletcher.

=== Origins of the clan ===
It was some time after the eleventh century that a band of Mac-an-leistears settled in Glen Orchy, Argyll, becoming the first to "raise smoke and boil water" on the Braes of Glenorchy, as the saying goes. There they became arrow makers to the Clan MacGregor and later, to Clan Stewart. Other small groups of Mac-an-leisters settled in glens that belonged to other clans, in order to make arrows for them.

The first recorded clan chief was Angus Mac-an-leister, who was born in about 1450. In 1497, the clan joined the Stewarts of Appin and the Maclarens in a battle against clan MacDonald, after which a bond of friendship was formed between the Mac-an-leisters and the Stewarts, sealed by an oath on the dirk.

As legend has it, Sir Duncan Campbell, the 7th Laird of Glenorchy, coveted the Mac-an-leister's lands and set his sights on seizing control of Achallader. Granted royal authority from James VI of Scotland to keep the peace among warring clans in Argyllshire and Perthshire, he seconded a group of militiamen to provoke a dispute with the Mac-an-leister chief by deliberately trespassing on his lands, leading to the death of one of the men at the hands of the chief. Accused of murder, Mac-an-leister was compelled to sign a deed in which all of his family lands were ceded to the Campbells. From 1587 onwards, the Mac-an-leisters were forced to become tenants of the lands in Glen Orchy.

=== Fletchers of Saltoun ===
Robert Fletcher, a merchant and burgess of Dundee, bought the Innerpeffer estate in 1596, and it was his son, Andrew Fletcher, Lord Innerpeffer, a judge, who bought the Saltoun estates in 1643. Andrew's grandson, Andrew Fletcher of Saltoun "the Patriot", was a fierce opponent of the union with England. He became MP for Haddington in 1678; however, he was forced to flee to Holland for having supported the Monmouth Rebellion against James II of England (VII of Scotland). The Saltoun estate was inherited by his younger brother, Henry Fletcher, whose son was Andrew Fletcher, Lord Milton, another judge who became Lord Justice Clerk and Keeper of the King's Signet.

=== Fletchers of Dunans ===
Archibald Fletcher, 9th Chief of the clan, settled in Dunans, Argyll, in the 18th century, after acquiring lands within the Glendaruel estate in 1745. The seat of the Dunans estate, Dunans Castle, was built in the Scots Baronial style for Angus Fletcher in the mid-19th century. Today, it is a designated building.

=== Jacobite risings ===
During the Jacobite rising of 1715, Archibald, the ninth chief of the clan, led the Mac-an-leisters in support of the Jacobites. Thirty years later, his younger brother John did the same in the Jacobite rising of 1745. However, in the latter rebellion, Archibald supplied men to the British-Hanoverian forces under his Campbell overlords, thereby avoiding forfeiture.

=== Highland Clearances ===
During the Highland Clearances, the majority of the Fletcher Clan were evicted from Glenorchy by the Campbell Marquesses of Breadalbane, after which many emigrated to the United States and Canada. Today, there are 29 Fletcher graves in Glenorchy church's burial ground and there are many more at Achallader Castle.

== Castles ==
Castles owned by the Clan Fletcher have included amongst others:

- Achallader Castle, three miles from Bridge of Orchy in Argyll, is a ruined tower house dating back to the 16th century. It was erected by the Campbells in the wake of their possession of the Mac-an-leister clan's lands. In 1603, the castle was set in flames by the MacGregors and again in 1689 by the Jacobites.
- Saltoun Hall, five miles west of Haddington, East Lothian was sold to Andrew Fletcher, Lord Innerpeffer in 1643, and was the seat of his descendants for several generations.
