= Saltoun Parish Church =

Coordinates: 55.90113°N 2.84209°W

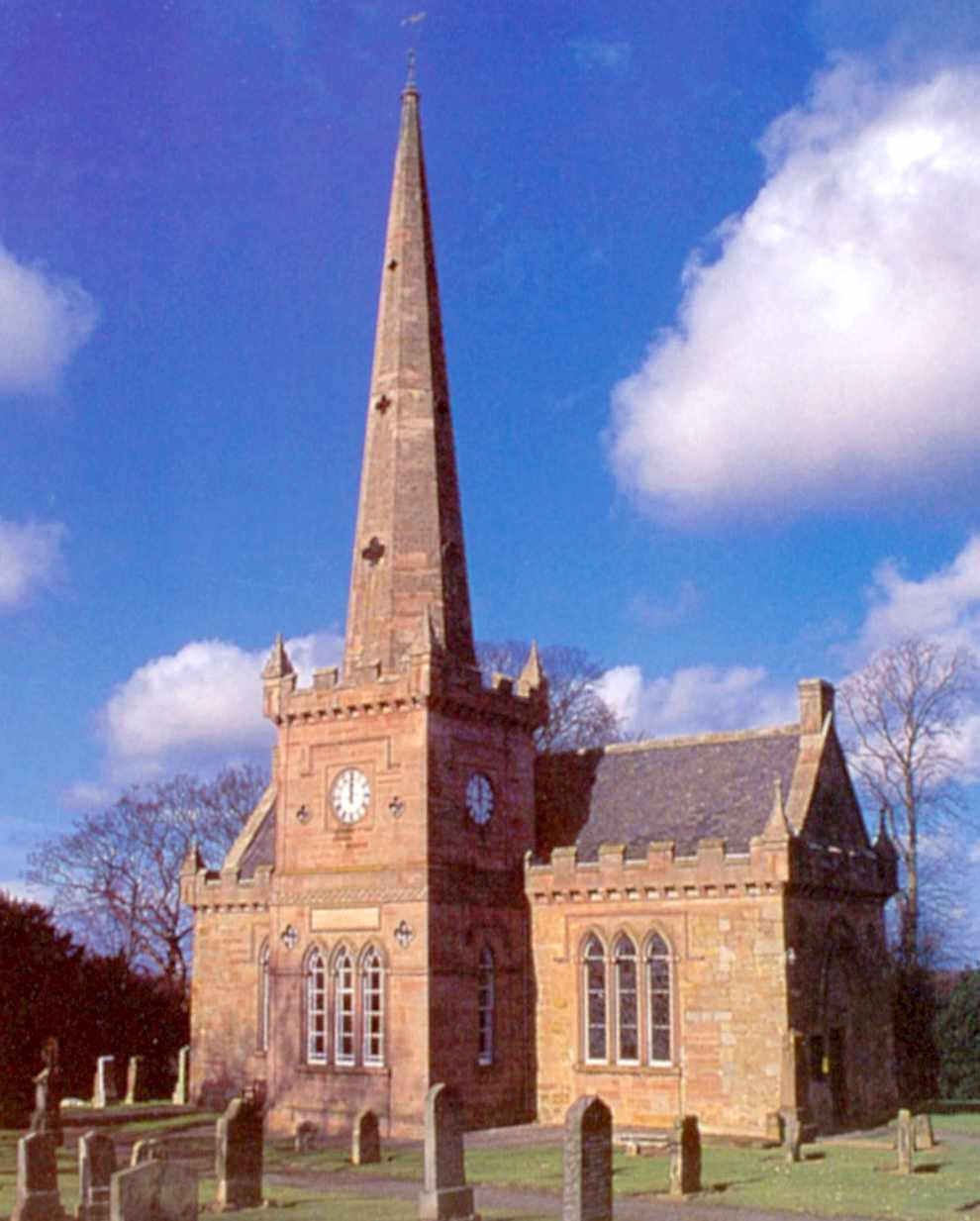
- Saltoun Parish Church
- Location: West Crescent, East Saltoun, East Lothian EH34 5EE
- Country: Scotland
- Denomination: Church of Scotland
- Churchmanship: Reformed; Presbyterian
- Website: Yester, Bolton and Saltoun Church website

Architecture
- Heritage designation: Category A

Administration
- Parish: Bolton & Saltoun

Saltoun Parish Church is a church in East Saltoun, East Lothian, Scotland. It is part of the Church of Scotland, and (along with Yester Church and Bolton Parish Church) serves the parish of Yester, Bolton and Saltoun, which includes the villages of Gifford, Bolton, East Saltoun and West Saltoun.

The church lies in the centre of the village.

== History ==
The first church in Saltoun Parish was built in 1244 by the Bishop of St Andrews, and was dedicated to Saint Michael. During the brief establishment of Episcopacy in Scotland in 1633, the church (and the control of electing a minister) was transferred to the Bishop of Edinburgh, before being passed to Andrew Fletcher, Lord Innerpeffer (the local land-owner) in 1643.

Gilbert Burnet (later the Bishop of Salisbury) started his ministry at Saltoun in 1665. During his five years there, he enlarged the church. He left in 1669 to become Professor of Divinity at Glasgow University and, later, Bishop of Salisbury.

The present church building was built in 1805, probably by the architect Robert Burn. The church is cruciform in shape, with the vestry and steeple occupying the eastern arm.

Below the church is the burial vault of the Fletchers of Saltoun Hall and in which is interred the body of Andrew Fletcher, (1655-1716) the politician and writer.

In 1929 the parishes of Bolton and Saltoun were united, and in 1970 the parish was linked (but not united) with Humbie to the south and Yester (Gifford) to the east.

== See also ==
- Humbie Parish Church
- Yester Parish Church
- List of Church of Scotland parishes
- List of places in East Lothian
