= Elizabeth Fletcher =

Scottish scholar (1731–1758)

Elizabeth "Betty" Fletcher
- Born: December 1731
- Died: 18 December 1758 (aged 26–27)
- Other name: "Betty" Wedderburn
- Education: Chelsea and Edinburgh
- Known for: her influence
- Spouse: Captain John Wedderburn of Gosford
- Children: One daughter

Elizabeth Fletcher later Elizabeth Wedderburn (December 1731 – 18 December 1758) was a Scottish scholar educated in Edinburgh. She had a short, but important life introducing many of the leading figures of the Scottish Enlightenment to people of influence. She was mainly known as Miss Betty Fletcher.

== Life ==
Elizabeth Fletcher was born in 1731. She was the penultimate child of eight born to Lady Elizabeth (born Kinloch) and Andrew Fletcher, Lord Milton.

She had no formal education but she was clever. She had spent three years at Miss Aylesworth's school in Chelsea, but it is reported that she would have learned singing and music but nothing more academic. In 1745, she finished her studies in Chelsea and in Edinburgh she was given further education by private tutors.

In 1747, the family moved from Saltoun Hall to Brunstane House east of Edinburgh.

Her father Lord Milton had great influence, counting among his friends Archibald Campbell, Lord Ilay, later the third duke of Argyll. Each summer, the family was invited to Inveraray Castle, the family estate of Lord Ilay.

Elizabeth knew the historian William Robertson, the philosophers David Hume and Adam Ferguson, the economist and philosopher Adam Smith, and John Home. Through these friendships, she introduced them to her father, Lord Milton, who subsequently introduced them to Lord Ilay. Ilay also had the ear of Sir Robert Walpole. Another acquaintance Elizabeth met at Invererary was the young architect Robert Adam, although the latter took a disliking to her, her sister Molly and her mother.

She married Captain John Wedderburn of Gosford. After he was posted to the West Indies, it was said that Fletcher had sufficient influence to have her new husband sent home, but she did not interfere despite the advice of her peers.

== Death and legacy ==
Elizabeth died on 18 December 1758, shortly after giving birth to a daughter. She said, "I have done my duty to my husband's honour, but my doing so has cost me my life". Her husband remarried, Mary Hamilton, with whom he would have fourteen children. In the last year of his life, he was made a baronet, changing his name to Halkett. Elizabeth's daughter was brought up knowing that she had a different mother than her step-brothers and sisters. Her step-brother became Sir Charles Halkett, 5th Baronet of Pitfirrane.
