= Bolton Parish Church =

Bolton Parish Church may refer to:

- Bolton Parish Church, East Lothian, Scotland.
- Bolton Parish Church (formally St Peter's Church, Bolton), Greater Manchester, England.

== See also ==
- Bolton (disambiguation)
