= Robert Burn (architect) =

Scottish architect

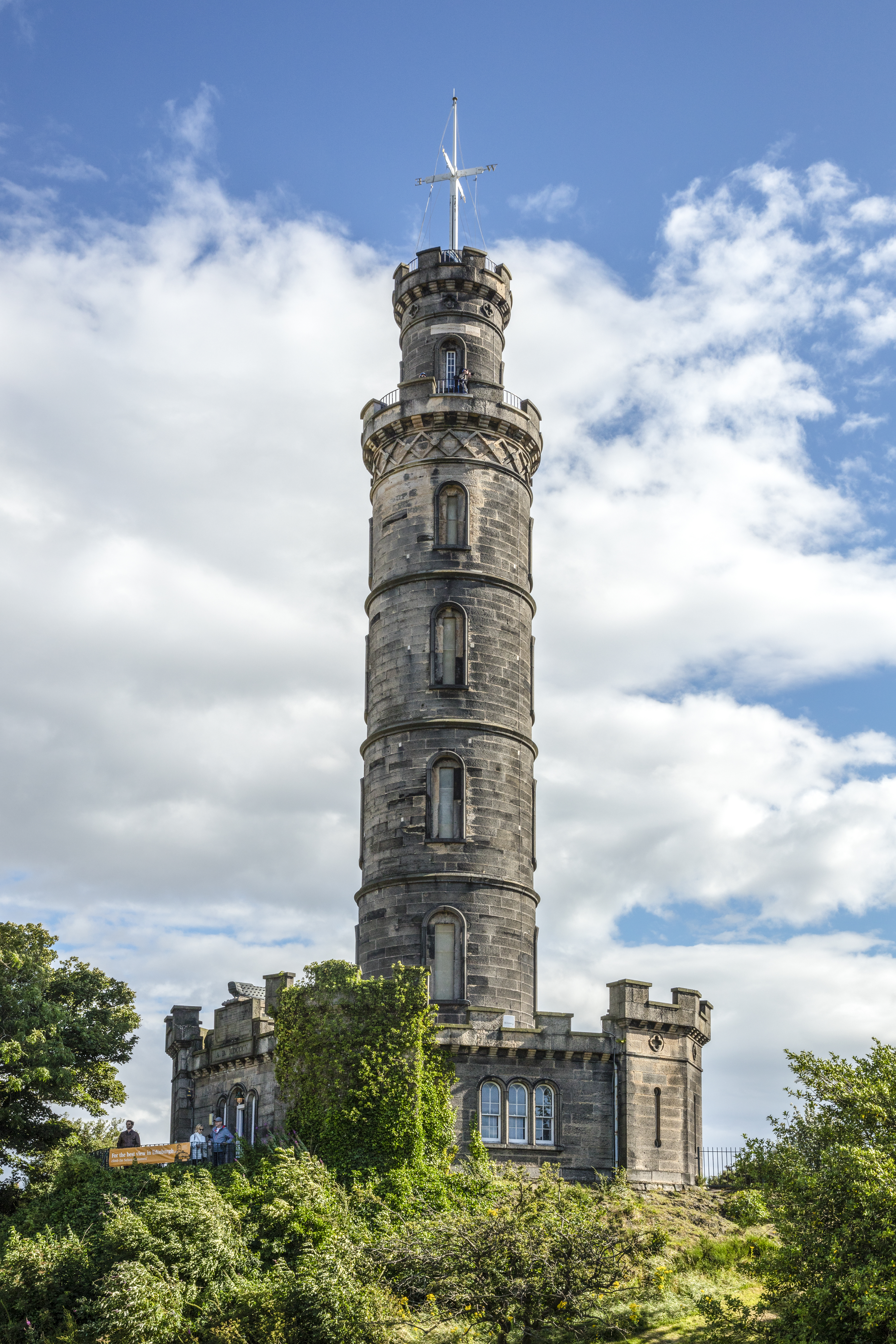
Nelson Monument

Robert Burn (1752–1815) was a Scottish architect. He was father to the architect William Burn.

== Life ==
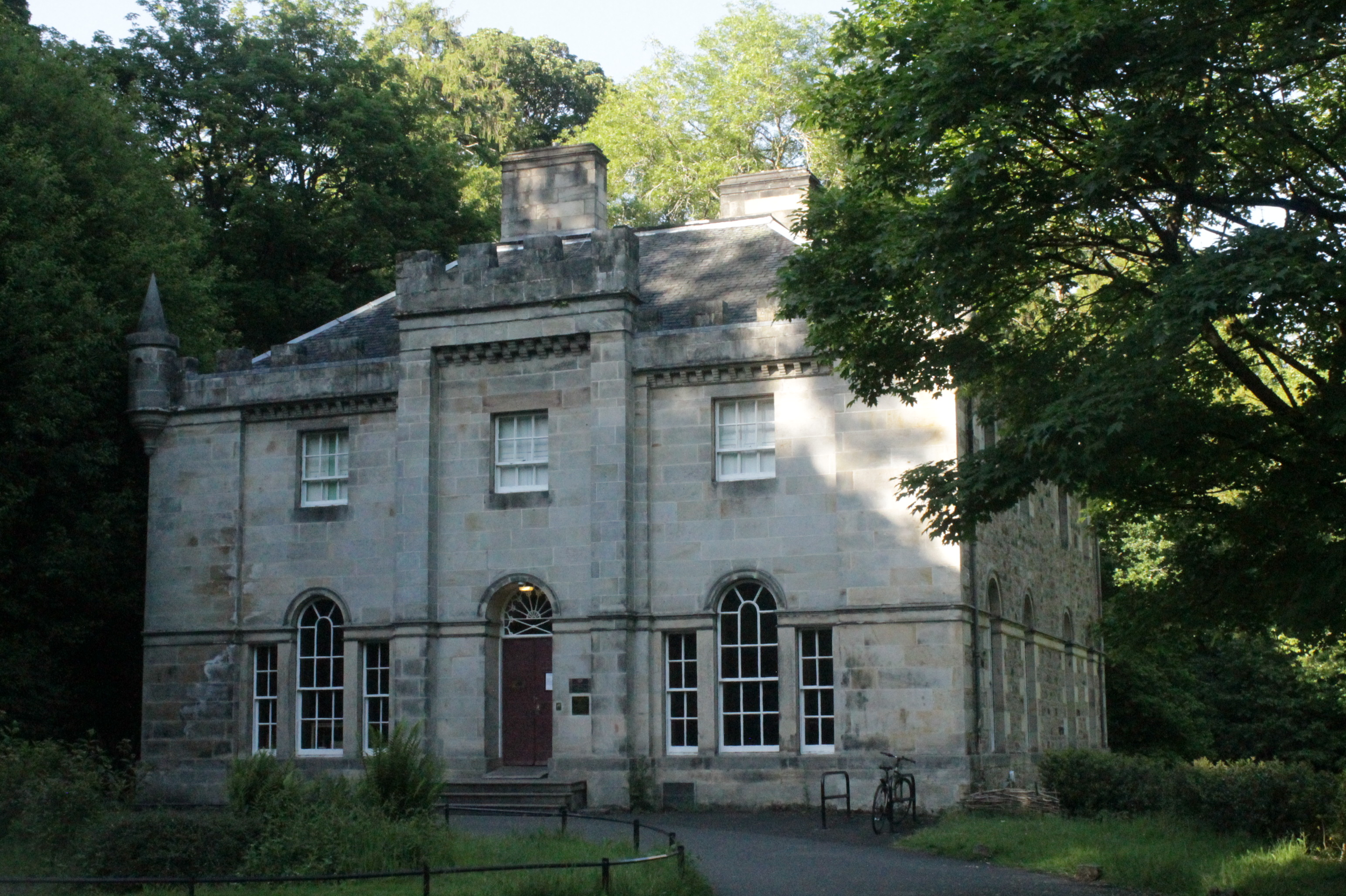
Hermitage of Braid

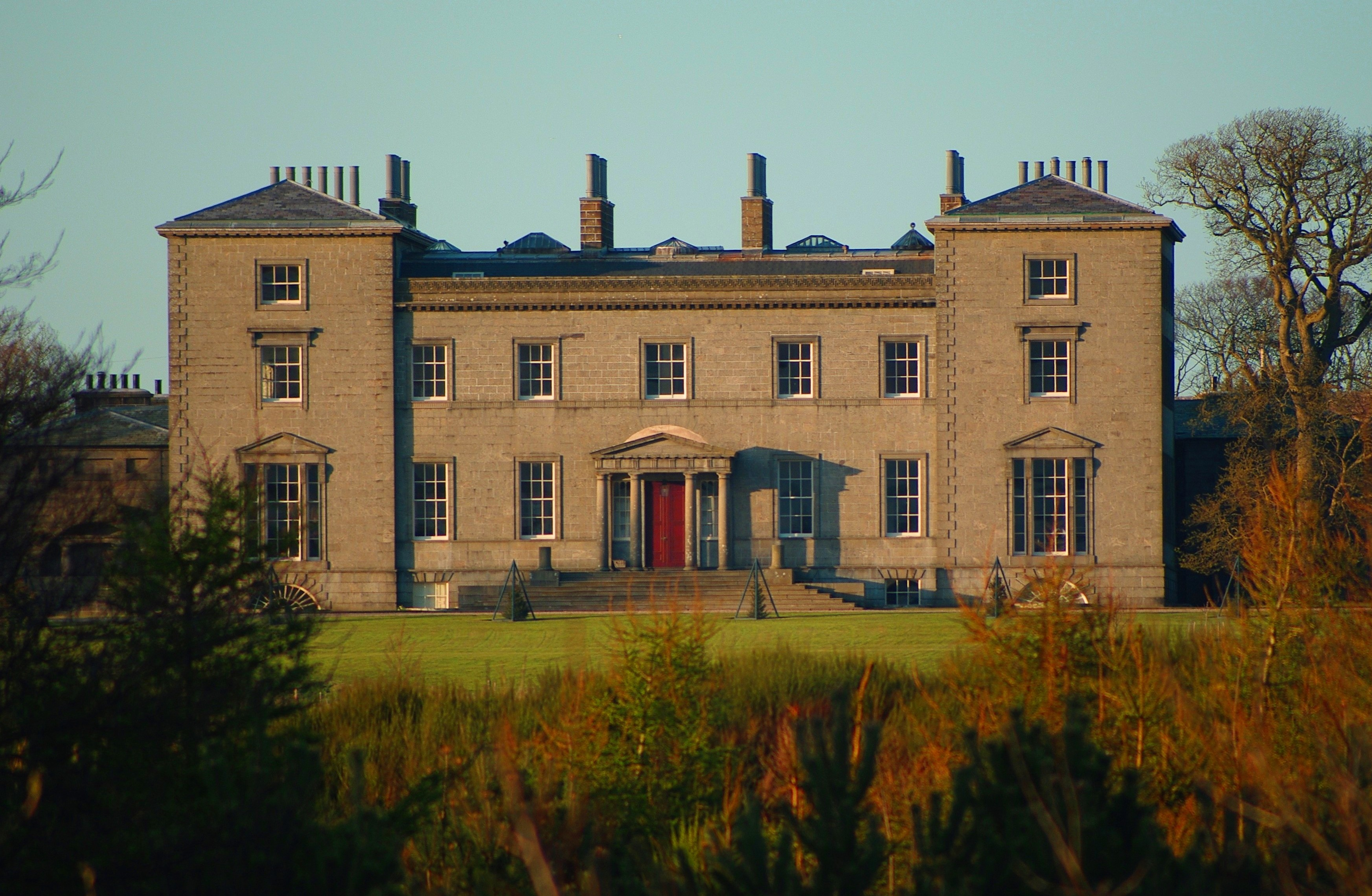
Cairness House viewed from the south

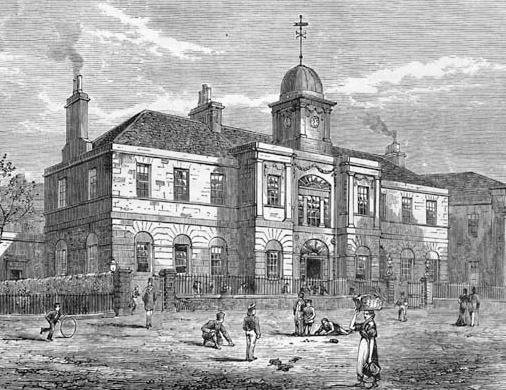
Leith Grammar School

He was born in 1752 in Jessfield House between Newhaven and Leith in north Edinburgh the eldest son of Robert Burn and his wife, Mary Patterson. He trained as a monumental stonemason.

From 1772 to 1775, he was employed by James Weir of Tollcross to repair and rebuild St Cuthbert's Church, Edinburgh.

In 1782, he was made a burgess of the town of Edinburgh and in 1796 entered the Dean of Guild Council.

From 1805 to 1815, he ran a drawing academy at Picardy Place in Edinburgh. This became known as the Trustees Academy and relocated to the Royal Institution in 1826.

In 1814, he is listed as Robert Burn and Company, Builder and Marble-cutter with yards on Leith Walk. He is then thought to be living with his son Thomas Burn at 24 Greenside Street at the top of Leith Walk.

He died on 5 June 1815 and is buried in a Gothic vault in Old Calton Burial Ground in Edinburgh City Centre. The grave lies in the western extension (only accessible via the south extension) and other than the nearby vault to David Hume is the largest vault in the cemetery.

== Family ==
He married Janet Laing (1765–1833) around 1785. They had 16 children.

== Works ==
- Edinburgh Public Dispensary (1776) for Dr Andrew Duncan
- Gravestone of the poet Robert Fergusson in Canongate Kirkyard (1779) commissioned by Robert Burns
- Cairness House near Fraserburgh (1782)
- Feuing of Nicolson Street in south Edinburgh (1785)
- Hermitage of Braid (1785)
- 141 to 171 Leith Street in Greenside, Edinburgh (1790) demolished 1969
- Netherurd House, Scottish Borders (1791) 19 bedroom mansion used as a centre for Girl Guides until 2020
- Teviot Bank House, Hawick (1791)
- Orbiston House, Bellshill (1795) destroyed by fire
- Remodelling of St Giles Cathedral (1796) – probably the addition of Gothic spikes on the exterior
- Cairnfield House, Buckie (1799) now flatted
- James Gillespie's School (1800)
- Lakeside House at Gordon Castle (1800)
- Feuing plan for Claremont Park on Leith Links (1801)
- Aberdour manse (1803)
- Remodelling of Saltoun Hall (1803)
- Saltoun manse (1804)
- Leith Grammar School (1804)
- Terrace of houses at Picardy Place, Edinburgh (1804–5)
- Alterations at Invermay House (1806)
- Feuing of George Street and Castle Street in Dumfries (1806)
- Nelson Monument, Edinburgh (1807)
- Grandholm Bridge (1810) replaced in the 1920s
- Lancastrian School, Leith Wynd, Edinburgh (1812)
