= Andrew Fletcher (patriot) =

Scottish writer, patriot and politician (c.1653–1716)

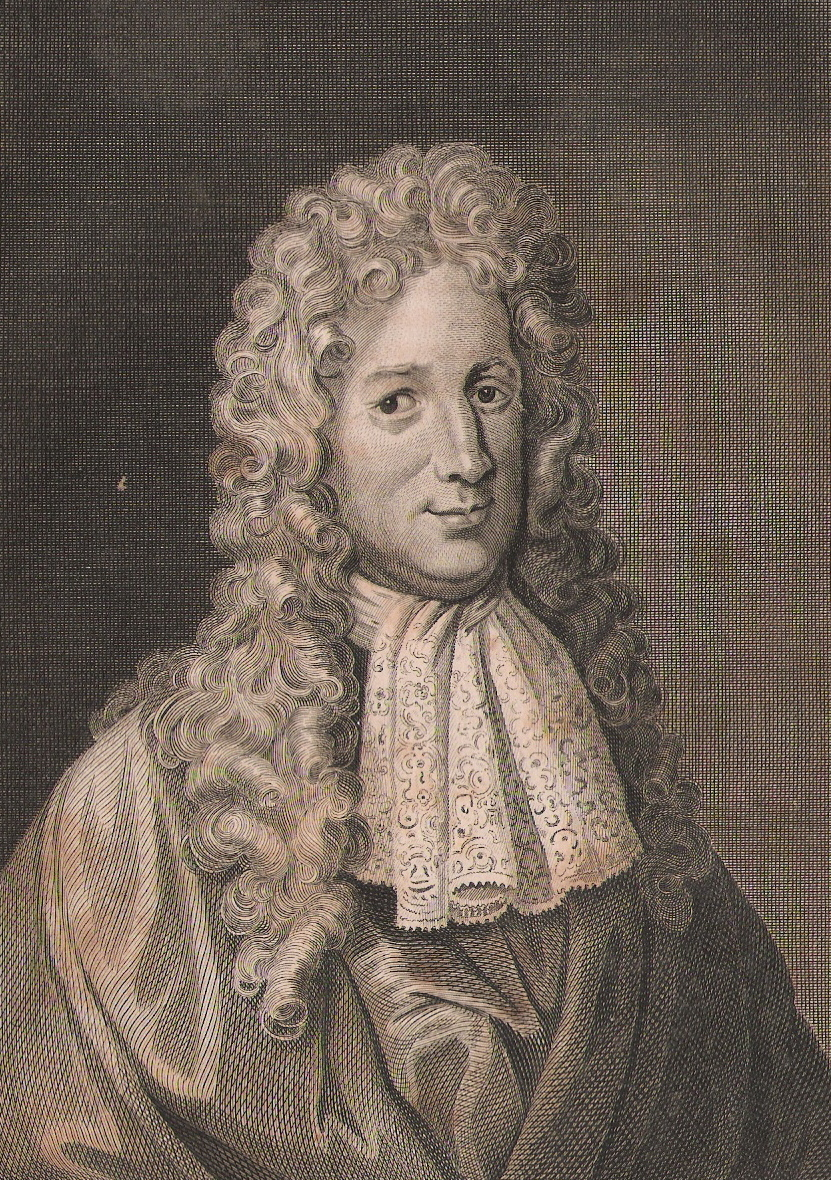
- Portrait of Fletcher

Commissioner for Haddingtonshire
- In office 22 September 1702 – 1707 Serving with John Lauder; William Nesbitt of Dirletoune; John Cockburne of Ormistoune
- Monarch: Queen Anne

Commissioner for Haddingtonshire
- In office 1681–1683

Commissioner for Haddingtonshire
- In office 1678–1680

Personal details
- Born: 1655 Saltoun, East Lothian, Kingdom of Scotland
- Died: September 1716 (aged 61) Paris, France
- Party: Country Party
- Relations: Andrew Fletcher, Lord Innerpeffer (grandfather); Andrew Fletcher, Lord Milton (nephew)
- Parent: Sir Robert Fletcher

Military service
- Allegiance: Duke of Monmouth (1685); William of Orange (1688)
- Battles/wars: Monmouth Rebellion; Great Turkish War; Glorious Revolution

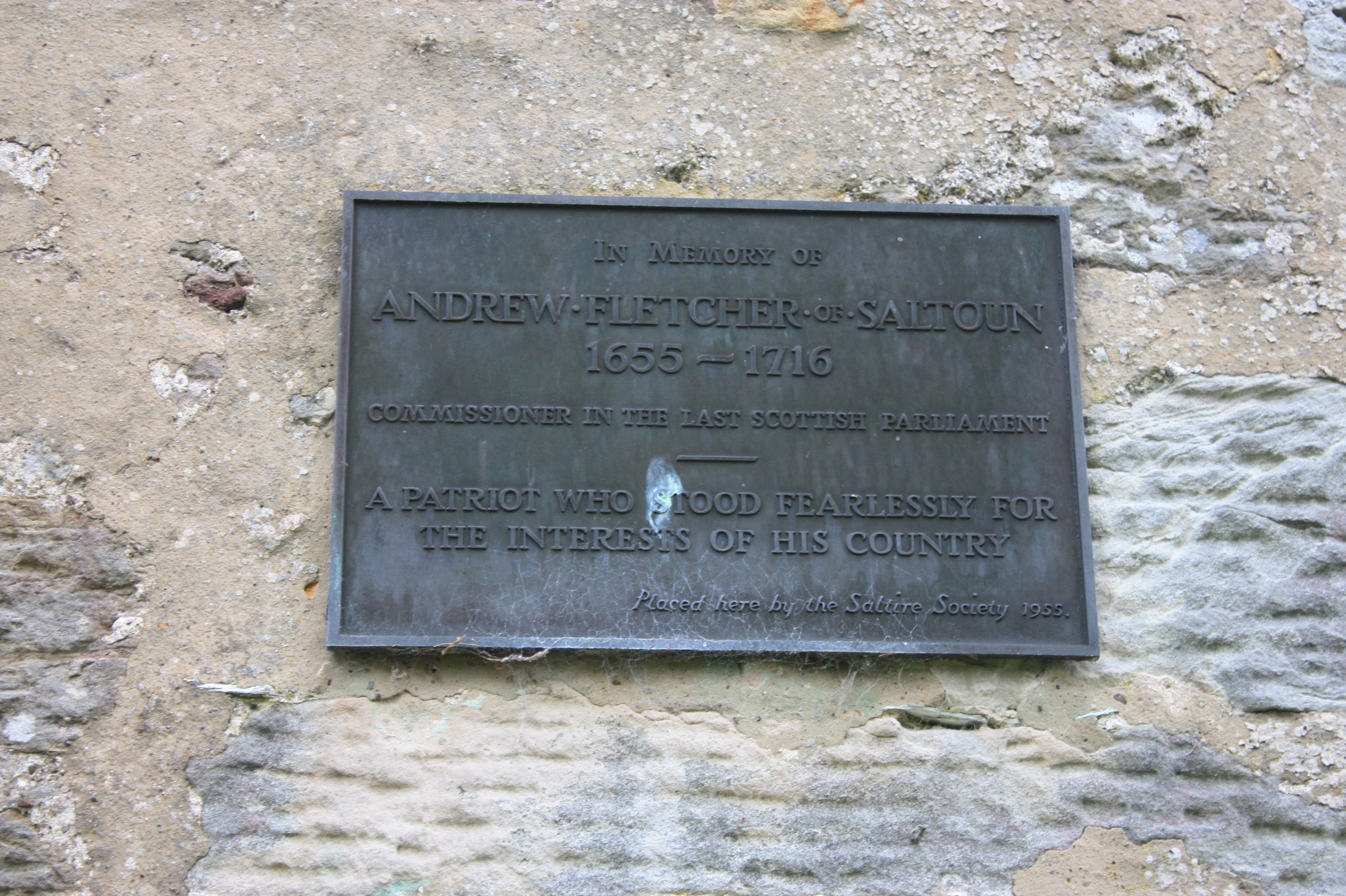
Plaque to Andrew Fletcher of Saltoun

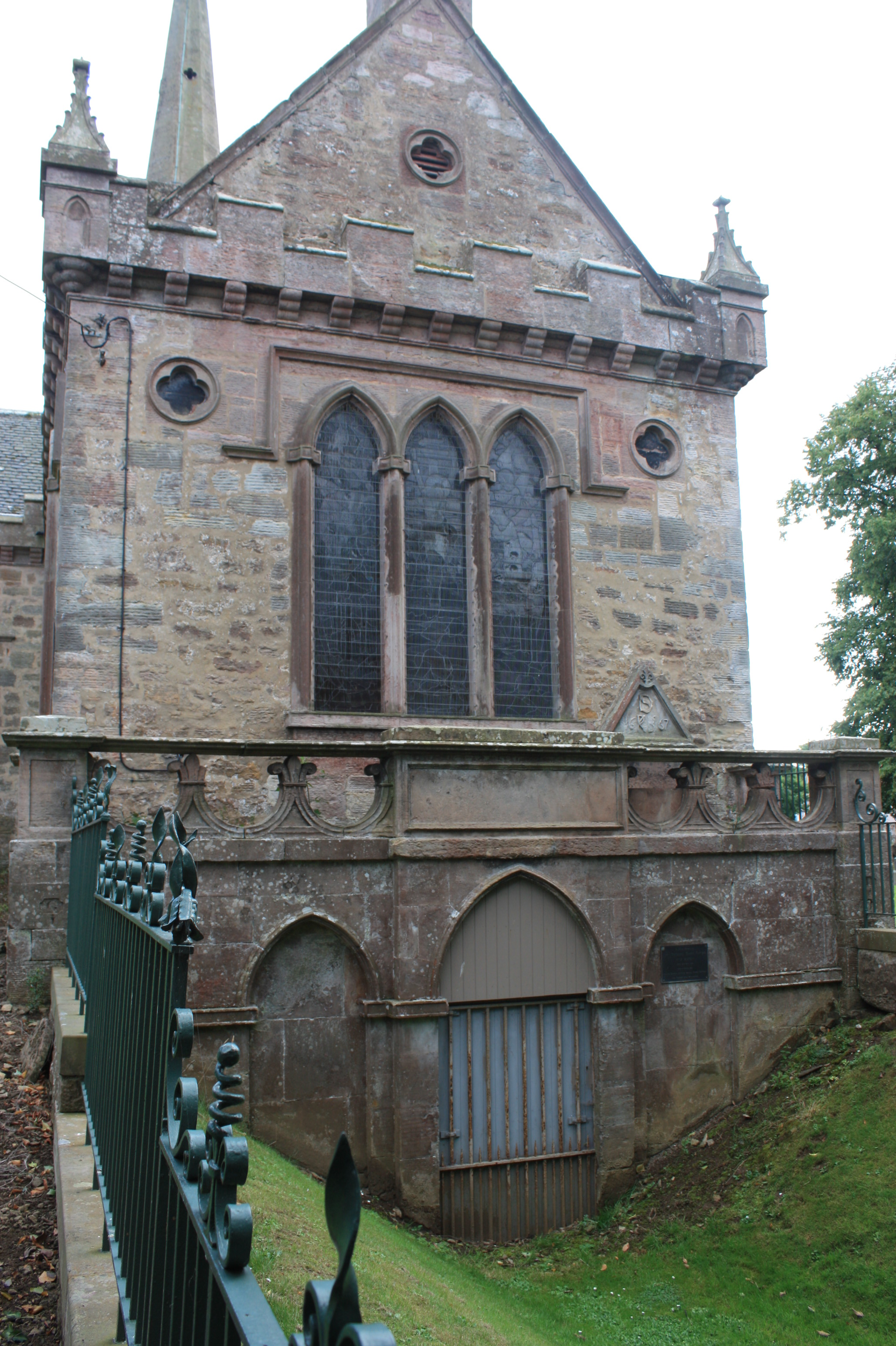
The burial vault beneath the church in East Saltoun

Andrew Fletcher of Saltoun (1655 – September 1716) was a Scottish writer and politician, remembered as an advocate for the non-incorporation of Scotland, and an opponent of the 1707 Act of Union between Scotland and England. Fletcher became an exile in 1683 after being accused of promoting insurrection. He was appointed the cavalry commander of the Monmouth Rebellion, but shortly after landing in England, he killed another leading figure. He again went into exile, this time as a fugitive and with his estates forfeit. He returned with William of Orange, becoming Commissioner of the old Parliament of Scotland.

Fletcher was a defender of the Darién scheme, although suspicious of the effect of conventional commerce on traditional virtues. He also deplored the effect of London's relative size, which he said would inevitably draw an accelerating proportion of wealth and decision-making to the south-east corner of Britain.

== Early life and political career ==
Andrew Fletcher was the son and heir of Sir Robert Fletcher (1625–1664), and grandson of Andrew Fletcher, Lord Innerpeffer, and was born at Saltoun in East Lothian. Educated by Gilbert Burnet, the future Bishop of Salisbury, who was then minister at Saltoun, he completed his education in mainland Europe. Fletcher was elected, as the Commissioner for Haddingtonshire, to the Scottish Parliament in 1678. At this time, Charles II's representative in Scotland was John Maitland, 1st Duke of Lauderdale. The Duke had taxation powers in Scotland, and maintained a standing army there in the name of the King. Fletcher bitterly opposed the Duke, whose actions only strengthened Fletcher's distrust of the royal government in Scotland, as well as all hereditary power. In 1681, Fletcher was re-elected to the Scottish Parliament as member for Haddingtonshire. The year before, Lauderdale had been replaced by the Duke of Albany. At this time, Fletcher was a member of the opposition Country Party in the Scottish Parliament, where he resolutely opposed any arbitrary actions on the part of the Church or state.

== Exile and return ==
In 1683, after being charged with plotting against the King, Fletcher fled Scotland to join with English opponents of King Charles in the Netherlands where he gained the confidence of James Scott, 1st Duke of Monmouth, being given command of the cavalry for the Monmouth Rebellion. Fletcher wanted to strike at the country militia while they were being formed up, and appropriated a fine horse belonging to the leading local sympathizer, Thomas Dare, who was shot dead when he became threatening in the ensuing argument. Monmouth was forced to send Fletcher away. Monmouth's forces failed to pursue a timely offensive strategy, and were defeated. After escaping from a Spanish prison, Fletcher fought in Hungary against the Turks before joining William of Orange, with whom he returned to Scotland in 1688, but his alliance with the Prince of Orange faded when it became clear William II - as he was in Scotland - was only interested in using the country to help fight foreign wars, and he drifted into the more oppositional Commonwealthmen faction for who he would write leaflets. His estates were restored to him and, increasingly, Fletcher defended his country's claims over English interests as well as opposing royal power. In 1703, at a critical stage in the history of Scotland, Fletcher again became a member of the Scottish Parliament as member for Haddingtonshire. Now Queen Anne was on the throne and there was a campaign to join England and Scotland in a parliamentary union, thus closing the "back door" to England that Scotland represented.

== Darién Scheme and the Act of Union ==
Fletcher had been a strong supporter of the Darien scheme, a financial disaster at the worst possible time for a country which had suffered repeated bad harvests; he continued to defend the scheme against those who painted it as an act of folly. Hurt national pride had led to many Scots blaming the scheme's failure on the hostility of England to it, and Fletcher and the Country party seized the opportunity to promote increased Scottish self-reliance. However, by practically ruining the Scottish elite the Darien scheme increased support for union with England, bolstered by offers of money to Scots who would support it. Fletcher continued to argue against an "incorporating union" and for a federal union to preserve Scotland's nationhood. Although not successful in preventing the Act of Union passing in the Scottish parliament through these debates Fletcher gained recognition as an independent patriot. One of his most famous pieces of writings was his "twelve limitations", intended to limit the power of the Crown to influence Scottish politics. His limitations were:

# THAT elections shall be made at every Michaelmas head-court for a new Parliament every year; to sit the first of November next following, and adjourn themselves from time to time, till next Michaelmas; That they choose their own president, and that everything shall be determined by balloting, in place of voting.

1. THAT so many lesser barons shall be added to the Parliament, as there have been noblemen created since the last augmentation of the number of the barons; and that in all time coming, for every nobleman that shall be created, there shall be a baron added to the Parliament.
2. THAT no man have vote in Parliament, but a nobleman or elected member.
3. THAT the King shall give the sanction to all laws offered by the Estates; and that the president of the Parliament be empowered by His Majesty to give the sanction in his absence, and have ten pounds sterling a day salary.
4. THAT a committee of one and thirty members, of which nine to be a quorum, chosen out of their own number, by every Parliament, shall, during the intervals of Parliament, under the King, have the administration of the government, be his council, and accountable to the next Parliament; with power in extraordinary occasions, to call the Parliament together; and that in the said council, all things be determined by balloting in place of voting.
5. THAT the King without consent of Parliament shall not have the power of making peace and war; or that of concluding any treaty with any other state or potentate.
6. THAT all places and offices, both civil and military, and all pensions formerly conferred by our Kings shall ever after be given by Parliament.
7. THAT no regiment or company of horse, foot or dragoons, be kept on foot in peace or war, but by consent of Parliament.
8. THAT all fencible men of the nation, between sixty and sixteen, be with all diligence possible armed with bayonets, and firelocks all of a calibre, and continue always provided in such arms with ammunition suitable.
9. THAT no general indemnity, nor pardon for any transgression against the public, shall be valid without consent of Parliament.
10. THAT the fifteen Senators of the College of Justice shall be incapable of being members of Parliament, or of any other office, or any pension; but the salary that belongs to their place to be increased as the Parliament shall think fit; that the office of President shall be in three of their number to be named by Parliament, and that there be no extraordinary lords, and also, that the lords of the Justice court shall be distinct from those of the Session, and under the same restrictions.
11. THAT if any King break in upon any of these conditions of government, he shall by the Estates be declared to have forfeited the crown.

Although the limitations did not pass the house, something little short of them was passed, the Act of Security 1704 (c.3 (S)), which made provisions in case of the Queen's death, with the conditions under which the successor to the throne of England was to be allowed to succeed to that of Scotland, which were to be, "at least, freedom of navigation, free communication of trade, and liberty of the plantations to the kingdom and subjects of Scotland, established by the parliament of England." The same parliament passed a Peace and War Act 1703 (c. 6) (S)), which provided that after the Queen's death, failing heirs of her body, no person at the same time being King or Queen of Scotland and England, would have the sole power of making war without the consent of the Scottish Parliament.

== Withdrawal from politics ==
In 1707, the Act of Union was approved by the Scottish Parliament, officially uniting Scotland with England to form the Kingdom of Great Britain. Fletcher turned from politics in despair and devoted the rest of his life to farming and agricultural development in Scotland. He died unmarried in Paris in September 1716. His last words were 'Lord have mercy on my poor country that is so barbarously oppressed'.

== Reputation in his time ==
He was reputed to have had the best private library in Scotland. Arthur L. Herman in How the Scots Invented the Modern World describes Fletcher as a genuine intellectual, but regards his vision for Scotland as retrograde. Alasdair MacIntyre has written, "Almost alone among his contemporaries Fletcher understood the dilemma confronting Scotland as involving more radical alternatives than they were prepared to entertain." Thomas Jefferson thought well of him, writing, "The political principles of that patriot were worthy of the purest periods of the British constitution. They are those which were in vigour at the epoch of the American emigration. Our ancestors brought them here, and they needed little strengthening to make us what we are."

== Works ==
His chief works are A Discourse of Government relating to Militias (1698), in which he argued that the royal army in Scotland should be replaced by local militias, a position of civic republican virtue which was to return a half-century later and foreshadowed the thinking of Adam Ferguson in lauding martial virtues over commercially minded polite society, which Fletcher thought enervating. The famous phrase "well regulated militia," which found its way into the Second Amendment to the United States Constitution, appears in this work, as does the phrase "ordinary and ill-regulated militia."

Two Discourses concerning the Affairs of Scotland (1698), in which he discussed the problems of Scottish trade and economics; and An Account of a Conversation concerning a right regulation of Governments for the common good of Mankind (1703). In Two Discourses he suggested that the numerous vagrants who infested Scotland should be brought into compulsory and hereditary servitude, it was already the case that criminals or the dissolute were transported to the colonies and sold as virtual slaves at that time. In An Account of a Conversation he made his well-known remark "I knew a very wise man so much of Sir Christopher's sentiment, that he believed if a man were permitted to make all the ballads, he need not care who should make the laws of a nation".

== Family ==
In 1747, Fletcher's nephew, Andrew Fletcher, Lord Milton, who had inherited Saltoun Hall, purchased the lands of Brunstane House to the west. William Fletcher, a first cousin of Andrew, moved to Ireland in the 1690s. His descendants settled in Dublin and County Offaly and became prosperous.
