= The Cave and the Light =

2013 book by Arthur L. Herman

- First edition
- Author: Arthur L. Herman
- Cover artist: The School of Athens by Raphael, 1509-11
- Language: English
- Genre: Philosophy
- Publisher: Random House
- Publication date: 2013
- Publication place: United States
- Media type: Print (hardback and paperback) and ebook
- Pages: 676
- ISBN: 978-0-553-38566-3 (hardback)

The Cave and the Light: Plato Versus Aristotle and the Struggles for the Soul of Western Civilization is the seventh non-fiction book written by American historian Arthur L. Herman. The book contrasts the philosophical approaches of Plato and Aristotle directly, then examines changes in political, religious, and philosophical views in western societies from the days of ancient Greece to the present in the context of their relationship to Platonic or Aristotelian viewpoints.

The book was published as a hardcover in October 2013 by Random House and as a trade paperback in June 2014.

== Synopsis ==
Using Raphael's The School of Athens painting to introduce the various schools of philosophy, Herman refers back to figures in the painting and their positions in relation to others frequently throughout the book. The first several chapters of The Cave and the Light focus on Socrates and his pupil Plato, as well as earlier philosophers whose ideas they built on: Pythagoras, Heraclitus, Parmenides. Herman next introduces Aristotle, a pupil of Plato who went on to develop a philosophical model at odds with Plato's. The book provides a detailed comparison between Plato's Republic and Aristotle's Politics. In addition to Plato's Academy and Aristotle's Lyceum, the book covers the competing and successive Hellenistic schools of philosophy: Epicureans, Stoics, Cynics, and Skeptics.

Herman attributes political, religious, and philosophical changes throughout history to the influence of the philosophies of either Plato or Aristotle. The Cave and the Light uses the framework of the two philosophers to discuss Alexandria, ancient Rome, Constantinople, the spread of Christianity, Europe in the Middle Ages, the Age of Enlightenment, the French Revolution, the founding of the United States, the rise of communism in Russia, and Nazism.

In an interview, Herman summarizes his book:

What gave Western civilisation its dynamism for so long was its creative tension and balance between the material and the spiritual, between what we aspire to be as spiritual beings and what we need to be as material beings and part of nature. That's the overall theme of The Cave and the Light and how that creative tension reflects the twin intellectual legacies of Aristotle and Plato, the greatest philosophers the world has ever known.

== Reception ==
In The Wall Street Journal, Roger Kimball describes the book as "a rollicking trip from classical Athens to 21st-century New York" and Herman as "an able storyteller". Kirkus Reviews described the book as "Breezy and enthusiastic but resting on a sturdy rock of research."

David Rieff, writing in The National Interest, criticizes Herman for both oversimplification and inconsistency, and takes issue with what he terms Herman's "dismissive treatment of the centrality of Judaism in the formation of Western culture and politics." Choice: Current Reviews for Academic Libraries recommends the book as "an introduction to Western intellectual thought", but also notes oversimplification as an issue for advanced readers.

Referring to the dialectic between Plato and Aristotle, Rod Dreher in The American Conservative notes, "Though Herman is pretty clearly on the side of Aristotle, he does a good job of showing how we need both insights" and says it is "a smart, fun book."

In the National Review, Brian Anderson describes it as "bold" and "a wonderful introduction to the intellectual history of the West." A review in The Buffalo News described the book as "a brilliant history of Western Civilization's essential polemic". The reviewer for the Knoxville News Sentinel wrote "this is an important book for anyone interested in the history of thought". In the Sun Herald, the review mentions Herman's "wildly interesting approach" to his theory of the battle between the teachings of Plato and Aristotle in the Western world.
