= Yester Parish Church =

Coordinates: 55.90376°N 2.74565°W

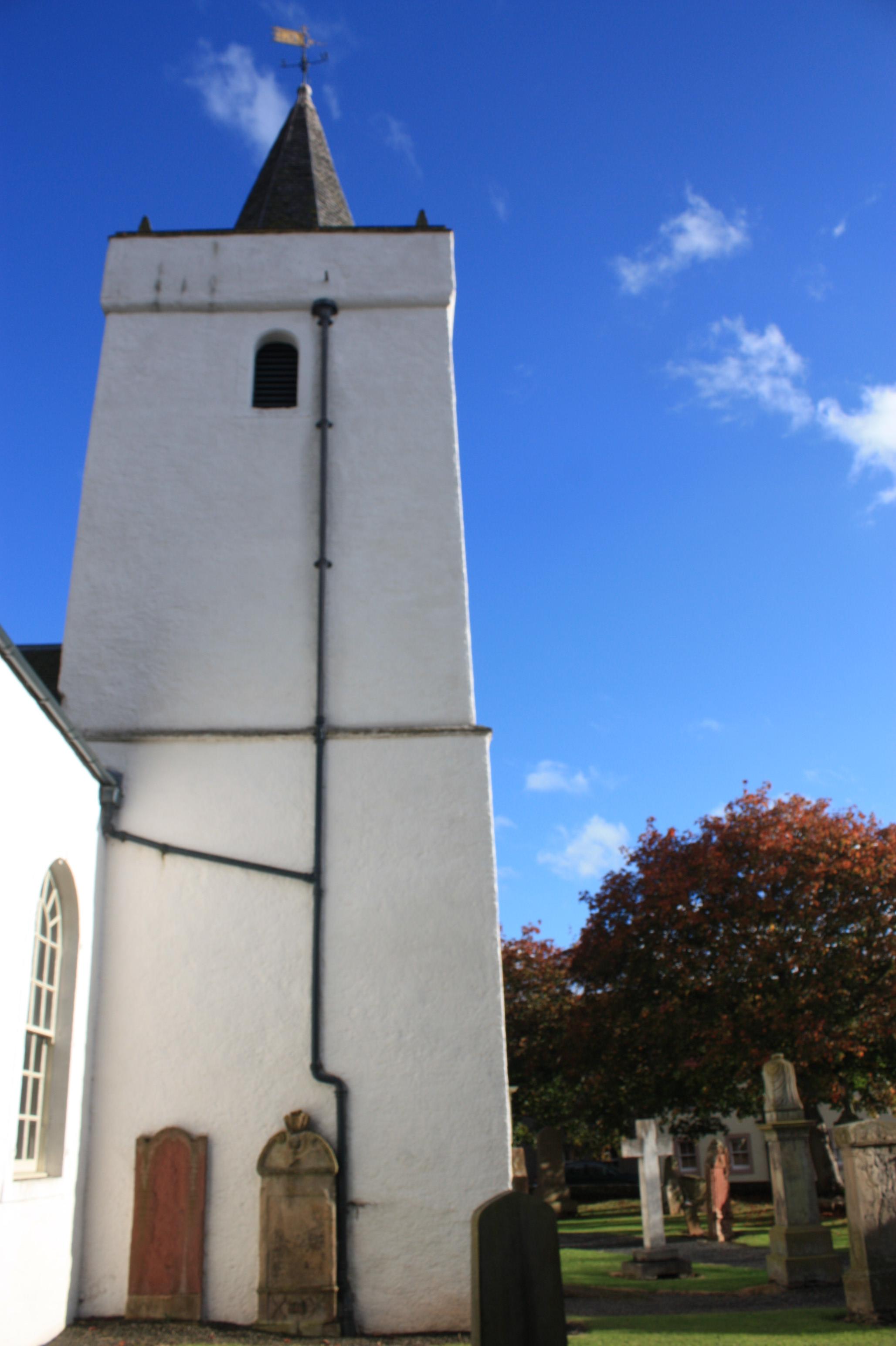
- Yester Parish Church
- Denomination: Church of Scotland
- Churchmanship: Reformed
- Website: Yester, Bolton and Saltoun Church website

Administration
- Parish: Yester, Bolton and Saltoun

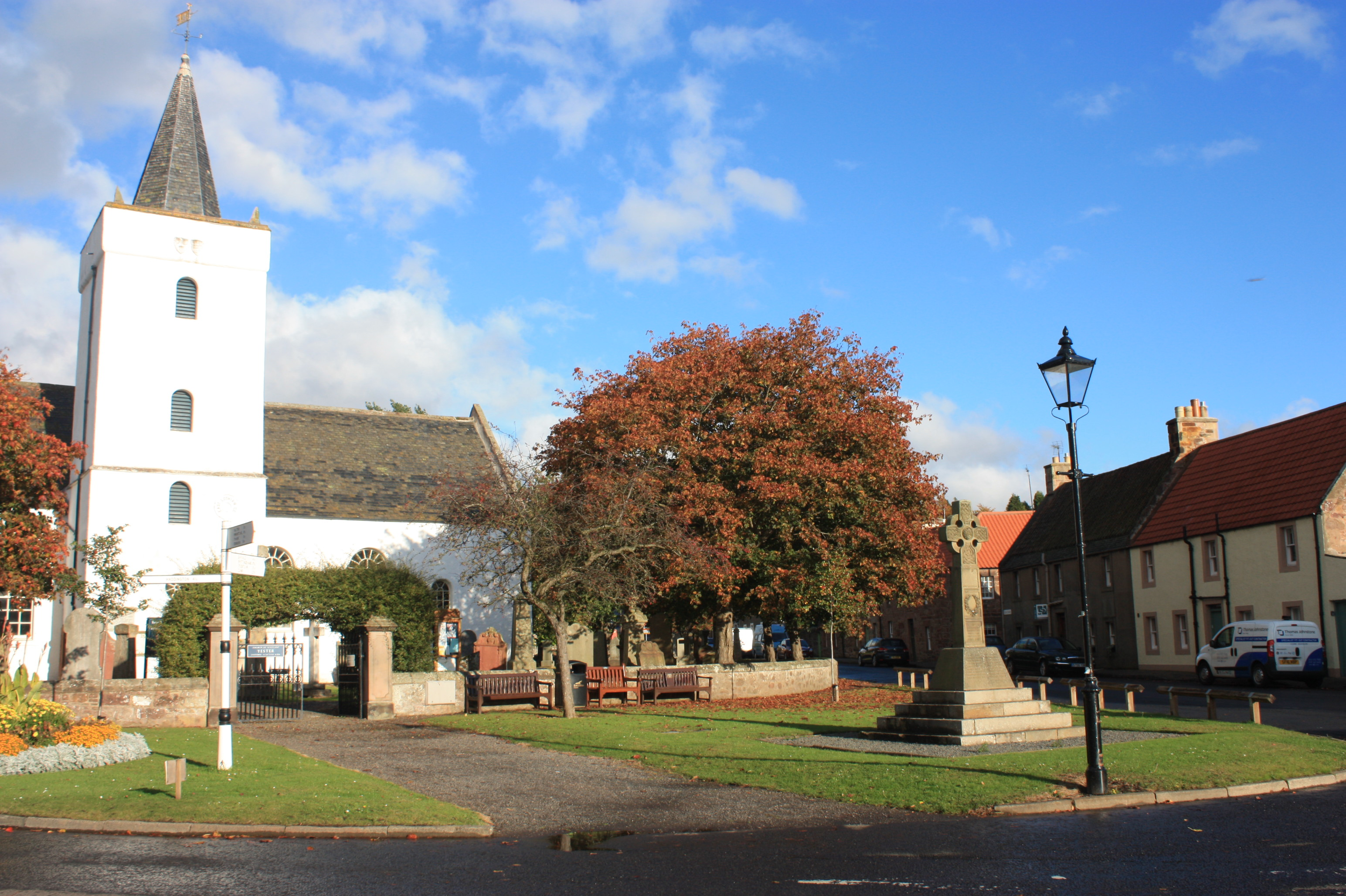
Yester Church and the village war memorial, Gifford, East Lothian

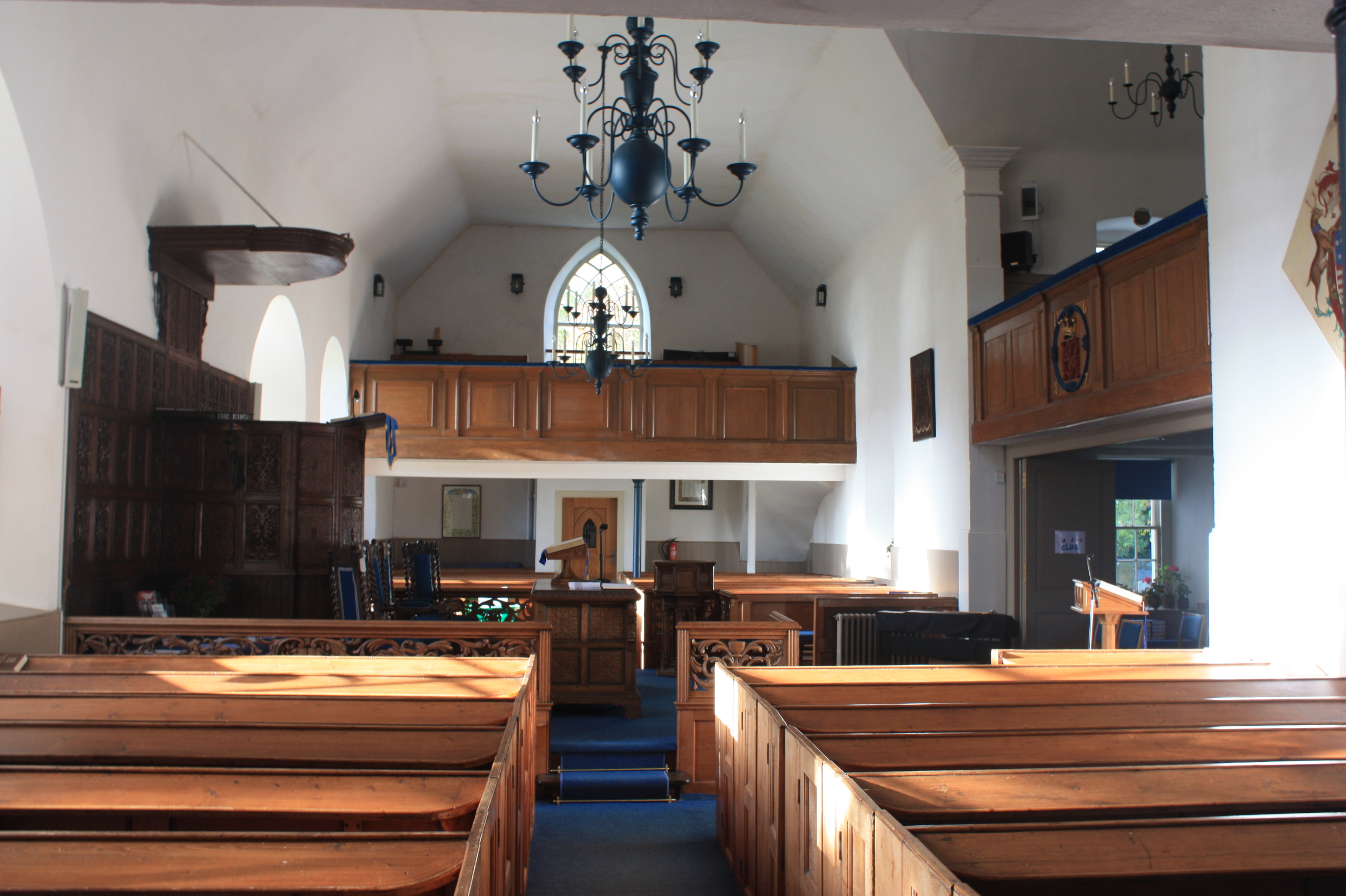
Interior, Yester Parish Church

Yester Parish Church is a church of the Church of Scotland in the village of Gifford, East Lothian, Scotland. The village forms part of Yester, Bolton and Saltoun parish, and is a linked charge with Humbie Parish Church.

== History and design ==
Several church buildings have been used during the history of the parish. The earliest record of a church in the area (St Bathan's Chapel) is from 1241. Its ruins lie in the woods beside Yester House, to the south-west of the village centre, and it was dedicated to Saint Baithin, a 6th century monk from what is now County Donegal. A church also once stood at Duncanlaw, a former settlement to the south-east of the main village.

The present building dates to 1708, and stands towards the north of the village, at the main road junction, just behind the village war memorial. The church is a Category A listed building.

== Notable graves ==
- Admiral of the Fleet Lord John Hay (1827-1916; memorial only)
- The 10th Marquess of Tweeddale
- The 12th Marquess of Tweeddale
- Gian Carlo Menotti (1911-2007), Italian composer

== John Witherspoon ==
Rev. John Witherspoon was born in Gifford manse in 1723, the son of Rev. James Alexander Witherspoon, the local minister. John Witherspoon emigrated and became a major leader of the Presbyterian Church in America. He was the only clergyman to sign the United States Declaration of Independence.

== See also ==
- Gifford
- Humbie Parish Church
- List of Church of Scotland parishes
- List of places in East Lothian
