= Andrew Fletcher, Lord Milton =

Scottish judge and politician (1692–1766)

The Right Honourable Lord Milton
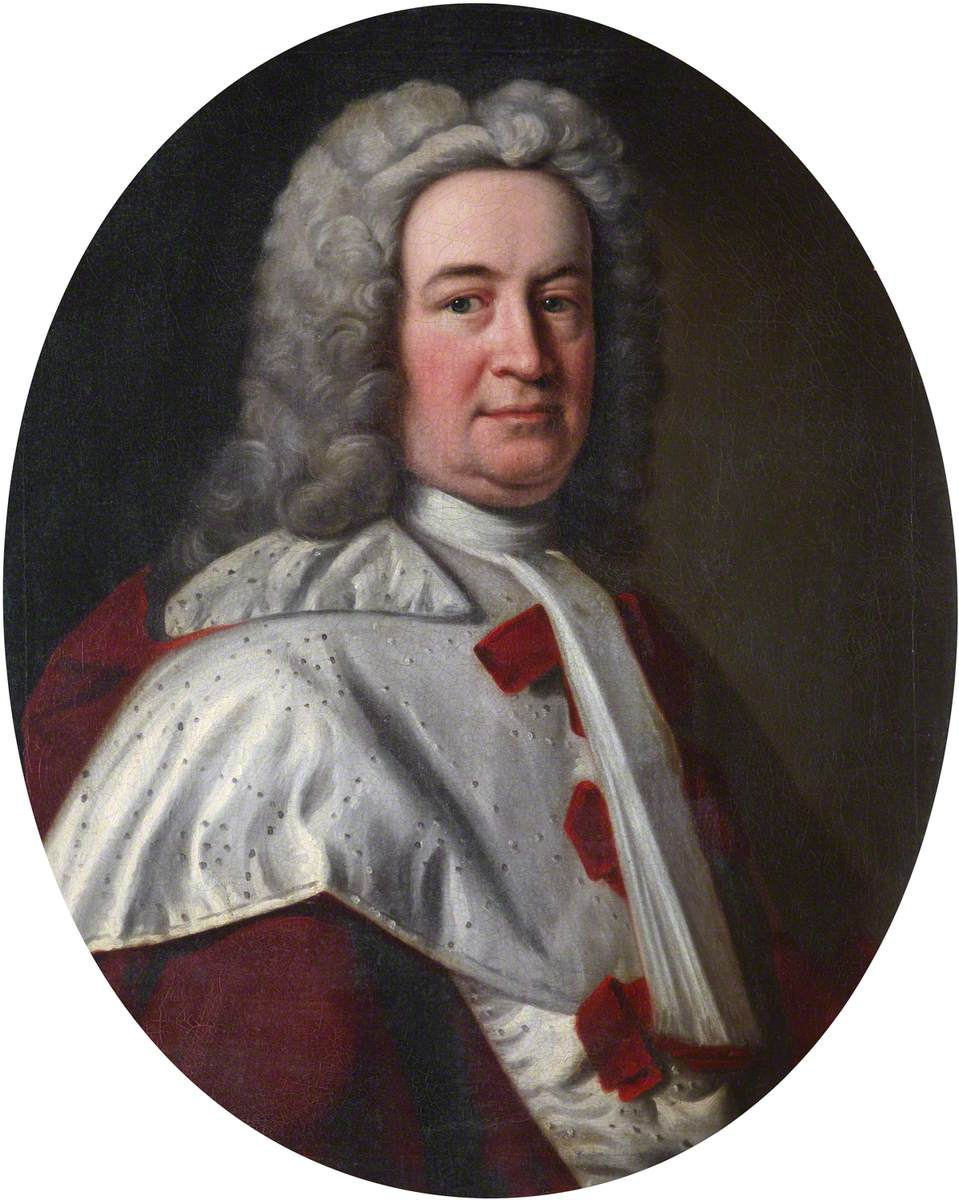
- Andrew Fletcher, Lord Milton (1692–1766), attributed to Allan Ramsay

Principal Keeper of the Signet
- In office 10 November 1746 – 13 December 1766
- Monarch: George II

Lord Justice Clerk
- In office 21 June 1735 – 1748
- Monarch: George II
- Preceded by: Adam Cockburn, Lord Ormiston
- Succeeded by: Charles Erskine, Lord Tinwald

Senator of the College of Justice
- In office 4 June 1724 – 13 December 1766
- Appointed by: George I
- Preceded by: John Lauder, Lord Fountainhall
- Succeeded by: James Burnett, Lord Monboddo

Personal details
- Born: 1692 Saltoun, East Lothian
- Died: 13 December 1766 (aged 73–74)
- Spouse: Elizabeth Kinloch
- Relations: Andrew Fletcher, Lord Innerpeffer (great-grandfather); Andrew Fletcher (uncle)
- Children: 8; including John Fletcher Campbell; Elizabeth Fletcher
- Profession: Advocate

Andrew Fletcher, Lord Milton (1692 – 13 December 1766) was a notable Scottish judge who was Lord Justice Clerk from 1735 to 1748 and Principal Keeper of His Majesty's Signet from 1746 to 1766.

== Family ==
Andrew Fletcher was born at Saltoun Castle near Pencaitland, east of Edinburgh, the son of Henry Fletcher of Saltoun (d.1733) (the first person to use machinery in barleymills in Scotland) by his spouse Margaret (d.1745), daughter of Sir David Carnegie, 1st Baronet of Pittarow (d.1708). Milton's paternal great-grandfather was the judge Andrew Fletcher, Lord Innerpeffer, and his paternal uncle was the politician and patriot Andrew Fletcher.

== Career ==
Having been educated for the Bar, he was admitted to the Faculty of Advocates on 26 February 1717. He succeeded Sir John Lauder, Lord Fountainhall as an Ordinary Lord in the Court of Session, as Lord Milton, taking his seat on 4 June 1724. On 22 August 1726 he was appointed a Lord of Justiciary in place of James Hamilton of Pencaitland, who had resigned.

The following year Lord Milton was named by Letters Patent, dated 5 July, as one of the Commissioners for improving the fisheries and manufactures of Scotland.

Upon the resignation of James Erskine of Grange, Lord Milton was constituted Lord Justice Clerk, taking his seat on 21 June 1735. On 10 November 1746, he was appointed Principal Keeper of His Majesty's Signet. He resigned his office as Lord Justice Clerk in 1748, but retained his appointments with the Signet and as judge of the Court of Session until his death.

In the mid-18th century he built Milton House on the south side of the Canongate on the Royal Mile, around ten minutes walk from the High Court. The building survived until the 20th century but is now only remembered in the name Milton House School which stands on its site.

== General ==
During the 1745 Jacobite rising, Lord Milton was much admired for the mild and judicious manner with which he conducted himself as Lord Justice Clerk in that difficult time. He abstained as much as possible from severe measures, and adopted means either to conceal, or recall such of the rebels as had been misled, as he put it, from the paths of loyalty, rather than actuated by premeditated designs to overturn the government. Much information which he suspected was sent to him by over-officious and malignant people, was found in his cupboards after his death, unopened.

In 1747 he purchased Brunstane House west of Edinburgh from James, 3rd Earl of Abercorn.

He was the friend and co-adjutor of Archibald Campbell, 3rd Duke of Argyll, and from the knowledge Lord Milton possessed of the laws, customs, and nature of Scotland, he proved himself to be a useful auxiliary to that statesman in pointing out such individuals as he judged to be best qualified to fill vacancies in the church and as Sheriffs. At the same time he endeavored to promote the welfare of Scotland, in improving its trade, manufactures, and agriculture.

== Family ==
Lord Milton married Elizabeth Kinloch, daughter of Sir Francis Kinloch, 2nd Baronet, of Gilmerton and his wife Mary Leslie, daughter of David Leslie, 1st Lord Newark.

Their eight children included:

- Andrew Fletcher, Auditor of Exchequer (Scotland) (d.1799)
- John Fletcher Campbell FRSE (1727–1806), of Saltoun, Haddingtonshire, & Boquhan, Stirlingshire. This laird assumed the additional surname of Campbell upon his succession to the estate of Boquhan, and married, in 1795, Ann or Agnes Thriepland or Threpleton, with two sons, Andrew and Henry. In 1803 he reassumed the title simply of Andrew Fletcher.
- Elizabeth Fletcher (1731-1758) was their seventh child. She died young but was a notable scholar.
