= Brunstane railway station =

Railway station in City of Edinburgh, Scotland

Brunstane
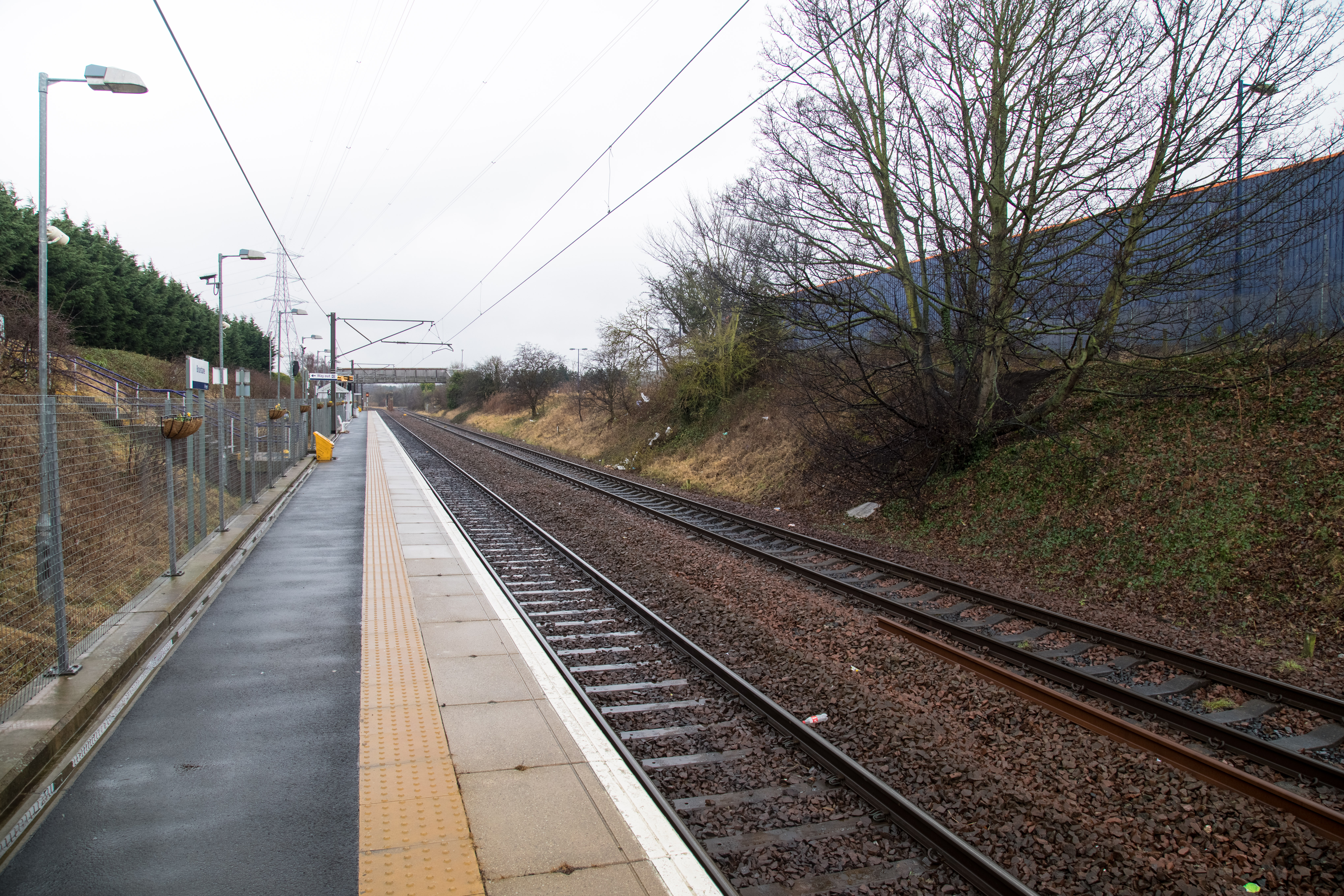
- View south towards Newcraighall in 2018

General information
- Location: Brunstane, City of Edinburgh; Scotland
- Coordinates: 55°56′31″N 3°06′03″W
- Grid reference: NT313726
- Owner: Network Rail
- Manager: ScotRail
- Platforms: 1
- Tracks: 2

Other information
- Station code: BSU

History
- Original company: Railtrack

Key dates
- 3 June 2002: Opened

Passengers
- 2020/21: ▼30,258
- 2021/22: ▲78,796
- 2022/23: ▲0.110 million
- 2023/24: ▲0.163 million
- 2024/25: ▼0.157 million
Location
- Location within the City of Edinburgh council area
Notes
- Passenger statistics from the Office of Rail and Road

Brunstane is a railway station on the Borders Railway, which runs between Edinburgh Waverley and Tweedbank. The station, situated 3 miles 72 chains (6 km) south-east of Edinburgh Waverley, serves the suburbs of Brunstane and Portobello in Edinburgh, Scotland. It is owned by Network Rail and managed by ScotRail.

== History ==
The station was opened by Railtrack on 3 June 2002, as part of the Edinburgh Crossrail.

Following the opening of the Borders Railway on 6 September 2015, the line was extended 30 miles 60 chains (49 km) south-east from Newcraighall towards Galashiels and Tweedbank.

== Services ==
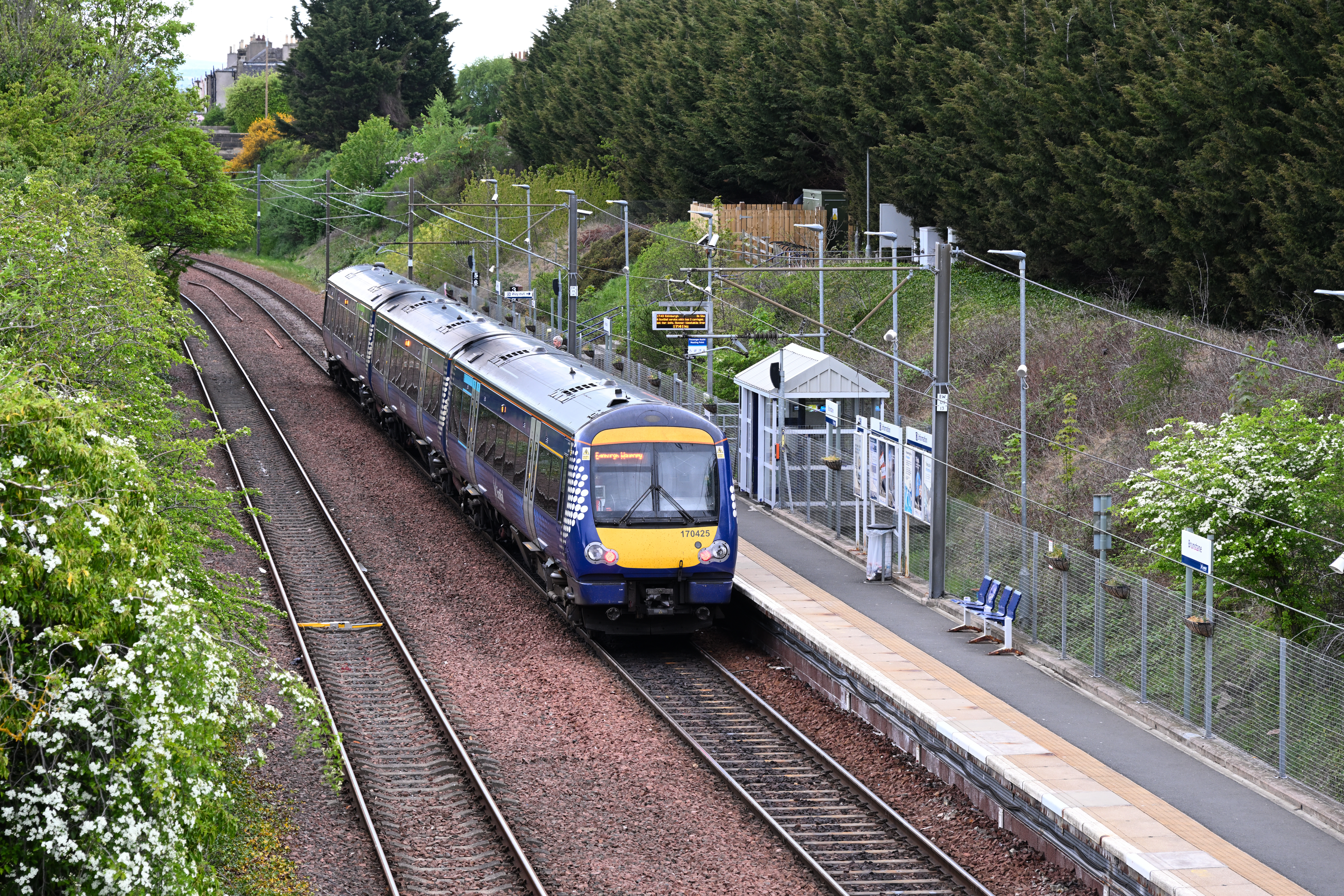
Class 170 at Brunstane (2025)

As of the May 2021 timetable change, the station is served by an hourly service between Edinburgh Waverley and Tweedbank, with a half-hourly service operating at peak times (Monday to Saturday). Some peak time trains continue to Glenrothes with Thornton. All services are operated by ScotRail.

Rolling stock used: Class 158 Express Sprinter and Class 170 Turbostar

Preceding station	National Rail	Following station
Edinburgh Waverley	ScotRail; Borders Railway	Newcraighall
	Historical railways	
Edinburgh Waverley	ScotRail; Edinburgh Crossrail	Newcraighall
