= Bolton Parish Church, East Lothian =

Coordinates: 55°55′16″N 2°47′24″W

Bolton Parish Church
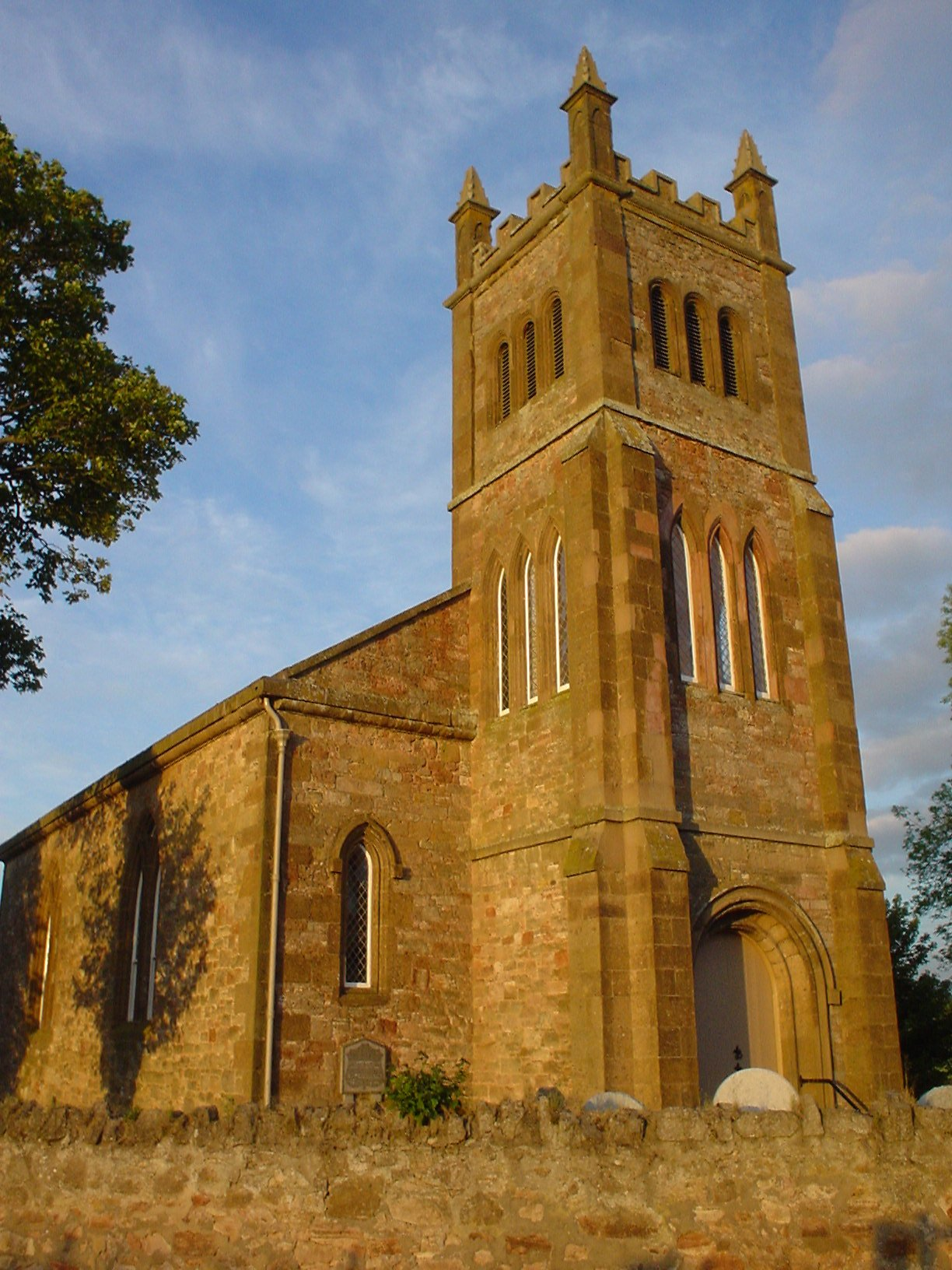
- Bolton Parish Church
- Location: Bolton, East Lothian
- Country: Scotland
- Denomination: Church of Scotland
- Churchmanship: Reformed, presbyterian
- Website: Yester, Bolton and Saltoun Church website

Administration
- Parish: Bolton & Saltoun

Bolton Parish Church is a church in Bolton, East Lothian, Scotland. It is part of the Church of Scotland and (along with Yester Church Saltoun Parish Church) serves the parish of Yester, Bolton and Saltoun.

== History and features of the church ==
The earliest church at Bolton was erected in around 1240. It was placed under the superiority of the Canons of Holyrood Abbey in Edinburgh, and remained so for the next three hundred years. By 1804 the church had fallen into disrepair and the heritors agreed that something must be done.

In January 1805 the heritors met and decided that a new church should be built instead of repairing the old one, and that the new church should be capable of containing 250 people. By the end of 1809 the new church was built. In 1930 the pulpit was moved to its present position at the side of the East window, the choir was removed and other changes were made. In 1957 a central aisle was introduced and this further reduced the seating.

In the church porch is a Victorian "graveguard", a contrivance designed to thwart body-snatchers who sought to steal from the graveyard newly buried corpses for sale to the medical schools in Edinburgh. The graveguard and its accessories are on display in the church porch.

Buried under the church's aisles are the Lords Blantyre and the Stuarts of Eaglescairnie. A notable possession of Bolton Church is the Bolton Hearse, a horse-drawn vehicle believed to be the earliest surviving piece of Scottish coachwork still in existence. The hearse is kept in the National Museum of Scotland in Edinburgh.

== See also ==
- Saltoun Parish Church
- List of Church of Scotland parishes
- List of places in East Lothian
