= How the Scots Invented the Modern World =

Book by Arthur L. Herman

- Author: Arthur Herman
- Subject: Scottish Enlightenment
- Genre: non-fiction
- Publisher: Crown Publishing Group, Three Rivers Press
- Publication date: November 2001
- Publication place: United States
- Media type: Print
- Pages: 392
- ISBN: 978-0-609-60635-3
- OCLC: 46857817
- Dewey Decimal: 941.1 21
- LC Class: DA772 .H53 2001

How the Scots Invented the Modern World: The True Story of How Western Europe's Poorest Nation Created Our World & Everything in It (or The Scottish Enlightenment: The Scots invention of the Modern World) is a non-fiction book written by American historian Arthur Herman. The book examines the origins of the Scottish Enlightenment and what impact it had on the modern world. Herman focuses principally on individuals, presenting their biographies in the context of their individual fields and also in terms of the theme of Scottish contributions to the world.

The book was published as a hardcover in November 2001 by Crown Publishing Group and as a trade paperback in September 2002. Critics found the thesis to be over-reaching but descriptive of the Scots' disproportionate impact on modernity. In the American market, the trade paperback peaked at #3 on The Washington Post bestseller list, while in the Canadian market it peaked at #1.

== Background ==
At the time of publication, the author was the coordinator of the Western Civilization Program at the Smithsonian Institution in Washington, DC. The book grew out of a class topic at the Smithsonian regarding intellectual life in Edinburgh in the 18th century. Herman was impressed by the fact that so many prominent individuals who had a significant impact on modernity had come from such a specific geographic location and time-frame.

Herman had only once been to Scotland as a teenager when his father, a professor, spent a semester at Edinburgh University. Though born and raised in the Midwestern United States, his ancestry traces back to Norway; there are no Scots in his ancestral background of whom he is aware.

== Synopsis ==
The book is divided into two parts. The first part, Epiphany, consists of eight chapters and focuses on the roots, development, and impact of the Scottish Enlightenment on Scotland and Great Britain. The roots come from an appreciation for democracy and literacy that developed from the Scottish Reformation, when John Knox brought Calvinist Presbyterianism to Scotland. He preached that God ordained power into the people and that it was for the people to administer and enforce God's laws, not the monarchy. For common people to understand God's laws they had to be able to read the Bible, so schools were built in every parish and literacy rates grew rapidly, creating a Scottish-oriented market for books and writers.

Though they each resented one another, the English and Scots joined in 1707 to form the Kingdom of Great Britain; the English wanted the Scots controlled and the Scots realized they could not match English power. The Scots immediately benefited from a centralized government that paid little attention to it—for example, inexpensive imports reduced the impacts of famines and allowed a Scottish culture to flourish. Herman calls the Scottish Enlightenment "more robust and original" than the French Enlightenment and that the product of the "Scottish school" was that humans are creatures of their environment, constantly evolving and trying to understand itself via social sciences.

The defeat of the 1745 Jacobite rising decimated the antiquated social structure based around clans lorded over by chieftains. This liberalized the Scottish way of life by allowing citizens to own land and keep the profits instead of giving all profits to the chieftains who owned all the land. Their literate foundation allowed the Scots to become economically literate and take advantage of trade. Edinburgh and Glasgow became epicenters of intellectual thought. There existed in Scotland a clergy who believed that a moral and religious foundation was required for, and compatible with, a free and open sophisticated culture, which moderated hardline conservatives. Herman presents biographies of Francis Hutcheson, Henry Home (Lord Kames), Robert Adam, Adam Smith, and others to illustrate the Scottish development.

The second part, Diaspora, focuses on the impacts of Scots on events, the world, and industries. Most Scots immigrants in the American colonies sympathized with the British during the American Revolutionary War but those who did fight in the militias were the most capable because many were the same refugee families from the 1745 Jacobite rising. Herman claims that the Scottish School of Common Sense influenced much of the American declaration of independence and constitution.

After Great Britain lost the American colonies, a second generation of Scottish intellectuals saved Britain from stagnation and reinforced a self-confidence that allowed the country to manage a world empire during the Victorian era. Scottish colonial administrators, like James Mill, were instrumental in formulating the idea of the civilizing mission, which posited that Europeans should take over indigenous cultures and run their society for their own good, as part of "the white man's burden". Herman claims that Sir Walter Scott invented the historical novel, giving modernity a "self-conscious antidote", and gave literature a "place as part of modern life".

In science and industry Herman states that James Watt's steam engine "gave capitalism its modern face, which has persisted down to today". It permitted business to choose its location, like in cities close to inexpensive labor, and it was Scots who rectified negative impacts industry had, i.e. the public health movement. Scots' contribution to modern society is illustrated with biographies of Scots like Dugald Stewart, John Witherspoon, John McAdam, Thomas Telford, and John Pringle, among others.

== Style ==
Herman wrote the book for an American audience which may not have been very familiar with Scottish history. He provides a historical overview and short biographies of the most prominent Scots. The historical approach uses the Great Man Theory, that a historical narrative can be told through the lives of a few prominent figures. Regarding this approach Michael Lynch of The Globe and Mail wrote, the biographies "reveal subtle but important links between these figures and their ideas, which Herman seeks to characterize, with some success, as a coherent body of distinctively 'Scottish' thought."

One reviewer noted the book's "almost complete dependence on secondary sources". Herman provides a section, at the end of the book, listing sources used and suggestions for further reading on each chapter. In this section, he notes that some of the most influential sources consulted included the works of Scottish historians Bruce Lenman, John Prebble, Thomas Devine, and Duncan Bruce, amongst others.

== Publication history ==
The book was published by Random House's Crown Publishing Group. The hardcover was released on November 27, 2001 and the trade paperback, published by the Three Rivers Press imprint, was released on September 24, 2002. In the US market the hardcover spent 3 weeks on The Washington Post bestseller list peaking at #5 followed by a 14-week run by the trade paperback, peaking at #3. In the Canadian market, the trade paperback spent 80 weeks on The Globe and Mail bestseller list, peaking at #1.

The British version re-titled the book The Scottish Enlightenment: The Scots invention of the Modern World and released in the UK market by Fourth Estate, a HarperCollins imprint. It was long-listed by the 2002 Samuel Johnson Prize for Non-Fiction.

== Reception ==
As a general introduction to the Scottish thinkers of the 18th century and to the subsequent activities of the Scottish diaspora, it is sensible and measured. Unfortunately, the author does not know when to stop. In rightly praising the Scots for their remarkable achievements, he wants to make them responsible for everything.

— Adam Sisman, The Washington Post

Regarding the title and thesis, that the people of Scotland invented the modern world, nearly every reviewer commented on it, some calling it "provocative", a "hyperbole", "absurd" and "pandering to prejudice".

In The Scotsman, Graham Leicester writes that the "overblown rhetoric invites a sceptical reaction. But I suggest we just accept this extraordinary compliment graciously." It was likely influenced by Thomas Cahill's How the Irish Saved Civilization and the result of a marketing strategy. Several reviewers found that Herman was successful in proving that Scots did have a disproportionate impact on modernity. Herman continued this type of theme with his next book, To Rule the Waves: How the British Navy Shaped the Modern World, published in 2004.

Critics found the book well-written and scholarly but with an over-reaching thesis. The reviewer for the National Review defended Herman's use of the word "invented", writing that it has "an older meaning: to discover and understand. The [Scots] did not, like a number of their French counterparts, seek to construct a new world ... they instead tried to understand certain traditions and institutions that had spontaneously arisen in the course of man's work, but that were still misunderstood even by many intelligent observers." In The Scotsman, reviewer George Kerevan wrote that Herman may have successfully proven his thesis but does not satisfactorily account for "why Scotland?"

Irvine Welsh accused Herman of neglecting or down-playing some of the unfavourable actions by Scots, like the Highland Clearances, and prominence in the slave trade in America, and the formation of the Ku Klux Klan. The reviewer for The National Interest noted that Herman's study falls short of explaining why the Scottish Enlightenment ended and why "Scotland had declined into a backwater by the end of the 19th century".

== See also ==
- Scottish inventions and discoveries
