= East Saltoun and West Saltoun =

Coordinates: 55.8989°N 2.8513°W

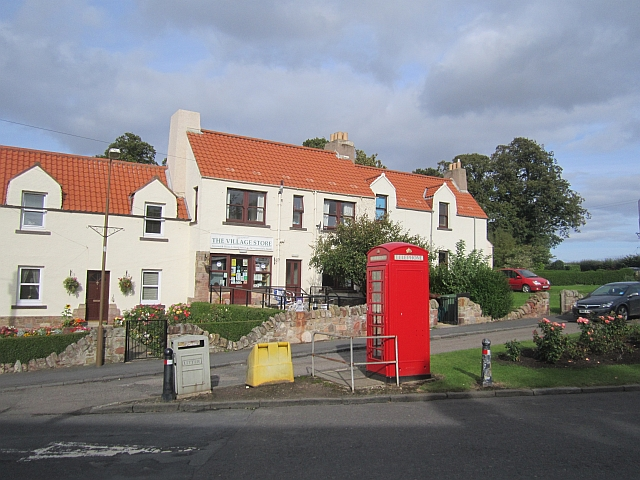
- Saltoun village shop

- Location within Scotland
- OS grid reference: NT467676
- Civil parish: Saltoun
- Council area: East Lothian Council
- Lieutenancy area: East Lothian
- Country: Scotland
- Sovereign state: United Kingdom
- Post town: TRANENT
- Postcode district: EH34
- Dialling code: 01875
- Police: Scotland
- Fire: Scottish
- Ambulance: Scottish
- UK Parliament: East Lothian
- Scottish Parliament: East Lothian

East Saltoun and West Saltoun are separate villages in East Lothian, Scotland, about 5 miles (8.0 kilometres) south-west of Haddington and 20 miles (32 kilometres) east of Edinburgh.

== Geography ==
The villages of East Saltoun and West Saltoun, together with a large number of farms and hamlets, form the rural and mainly agricultural parish of Saltoun. The two villages lie in the foothills of the Lammermuirs and are separated from each other by about one mile. To the south the villages are largely bordered by woodland: Petersmuir Wood, Dryden, and Saltoun Big Wood.

== History ==
In the 12th century David I gave lands in Saltoun to Hugh de Moreville. In 1643 the lands and barony were sold to Andrew Fletcher, Lord Innerpeffer, (grandfather of Andrew Fletcher, the Patriot), and it was the Fletcher family who attempted to make Saltoun a centre of manufacturing in the early 18th century. Most industry was sited in West Saltoun (formerly Milton), on the Birns Water. At the instigation of Andrew Fletcher, James Meikle, a neighbouring millwright, went to Holland to learn the construction of the iron-work of barley mills, and the mill which he erected at Salton after his return not only gave Salton barley a strong hold on the market, but was also for forty years the only mill of its kind in the British Isles.

Another Andrew Fletcher, nephew of the elder Andrew, became Lord Justice Clerk as Lord Milton. By his mother's energy the art of weaving and dressing Holland cloth was introduced into the village. She travelled in Holland with two skilled mechanics who learned the secrets of the craft. Under Lord Milton's patronage, the British Linen Company had bleachfields in West Saltoun in 1746.

In the early 19th century the Fletcher family invested further in the parish by helping to pay for a new church, manse and school in East Saltoun, and commissioning additions to Saltoun Hall (near West Saltoun).

By the mid 19th century most of the parish's industries were failing, and the land was given over to agriculture.

== East Saltoun ==
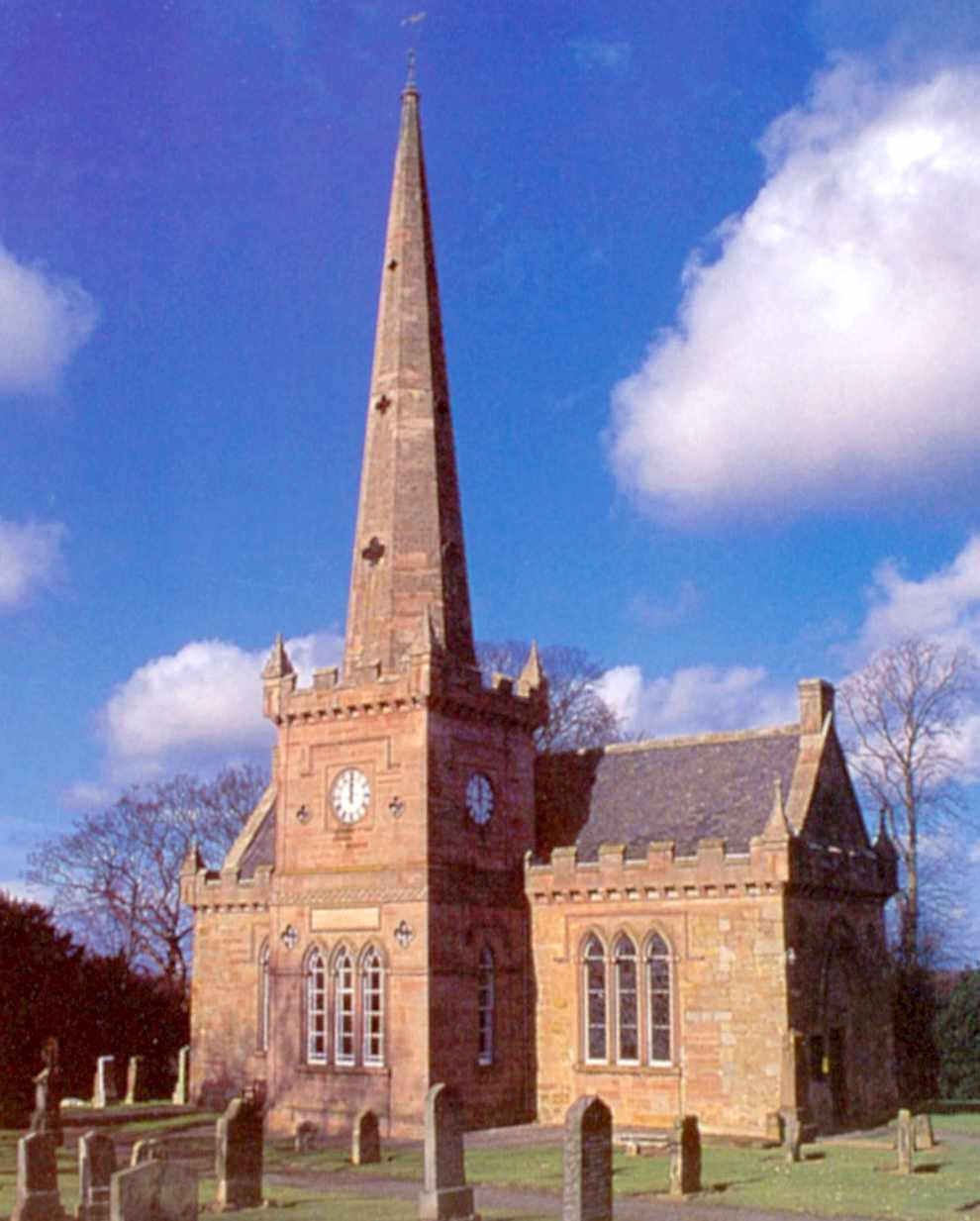
Saltoun Parish Church

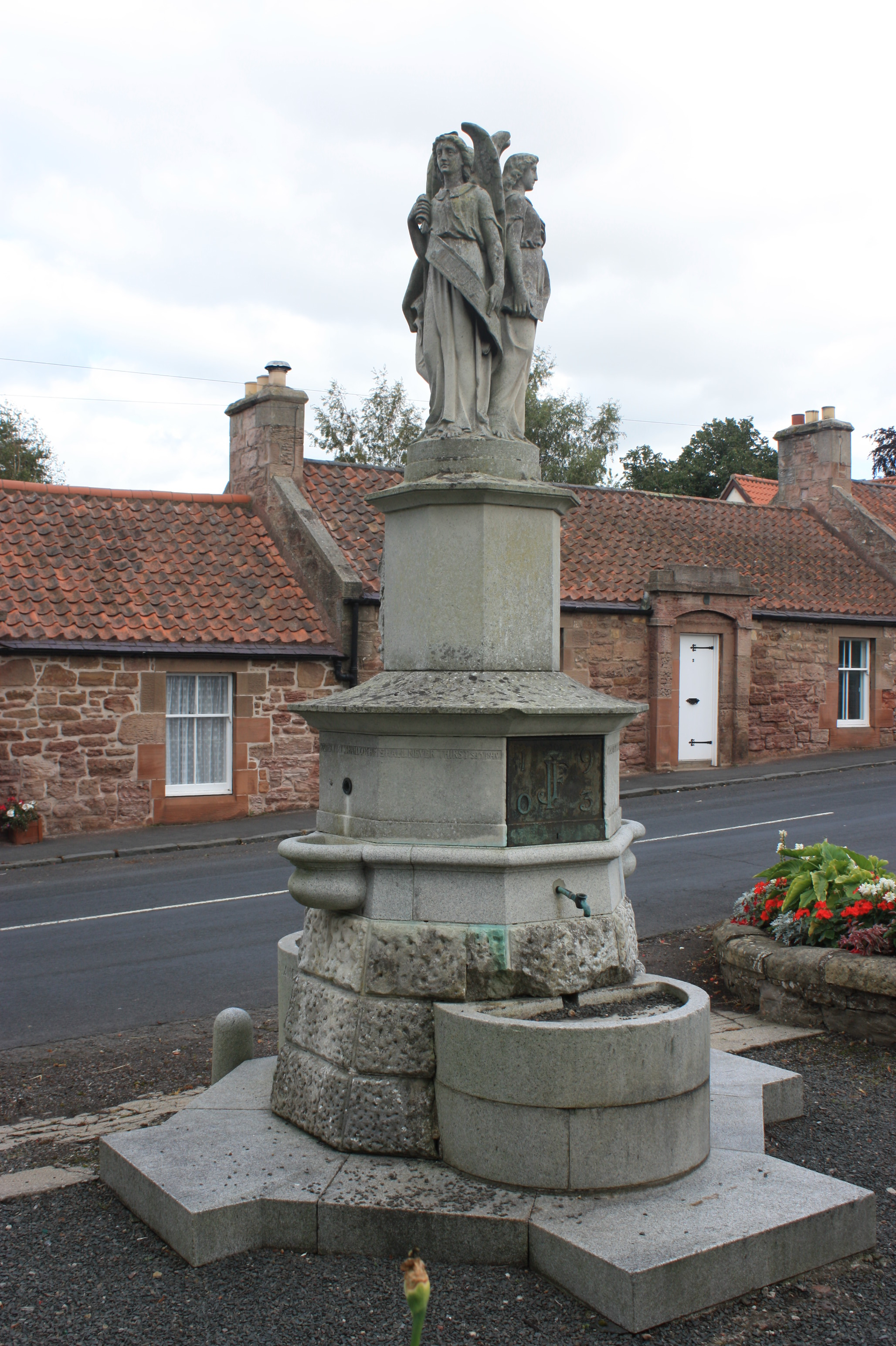
The Fountain to John Fletcher of Saltoun

East Saltoun (once known as Kirkton) is the larger of the two villages.

A church dedicated to Saint Michael was first consecrated in 1244, and several church buildings have been used since then. Gilbert Burnet, theologian and Bishop of Salisbury, started his ministry in Saltoun in 1665. The present building dates back to 1805, and is built in the shape of a cross with a Gothic-style tower and steeple.

Local facilities include a garage, shop, village hall, blacksmith, and a school. The school serves East Saltoun and West Saltoun, as well as the wider parish, and as of 2008 the roll was 49.

== West Saltoun ==
At one time West Saltoun was larger and had its own school, post office, and shop. Today, West Saltoun is smaller and is made up of just a few houses, with Saltoun Big Wood and the Birns Water nearby.

== Infrastructure ==
The B6355 road runs through East Saltoun, connecting it to Gifford in the east, and Pencaitland in the north-west. A former branch railway line that linked East and West Saltoun to Gifford, Haddington, and ultimately Edinburgh was closed to passengers in 1933 and is now a cycle path.

== Notable people ==
- Gilbert Burnet, theologian and Bishop of Salisbury, was minister here from 1665 to 1669 who, at his death, bequeathed the parish 20,000 marks for the clothing and educating of poor children.
- Patrick Fairbairn, Church of Scotland minister and Free Church minister, professor and Moderator
- William de Abernethy, 2nd Baron of Saltoun, local landowner
- Andrew Fletcher of Saltoun, the Scottish patriot, was born here in 1653.
- Andrew Fletcher, Lord Milton (1692–1766), Lord Justice.
- Hugh de Moreville, Lord High Constable of Scotland and friend of David I, owned land in Saltoun.
- Sir Arthur Thomson, the biologist, was born in 1861.
- John Swinton (1829–1901), journalist.

== See also ==
- Saltoun Parish Church
- List of places in East Lothian

== Sources ==
- Scott, Hew (1915). Fasti ecclesiae scoticanae; the succession of ministers in the Church of Scotland from the reformation. Vol. 1. Edinburgh: Oliver and Boyd. p. 394.
