= Arthur Herman (author) =

American historian

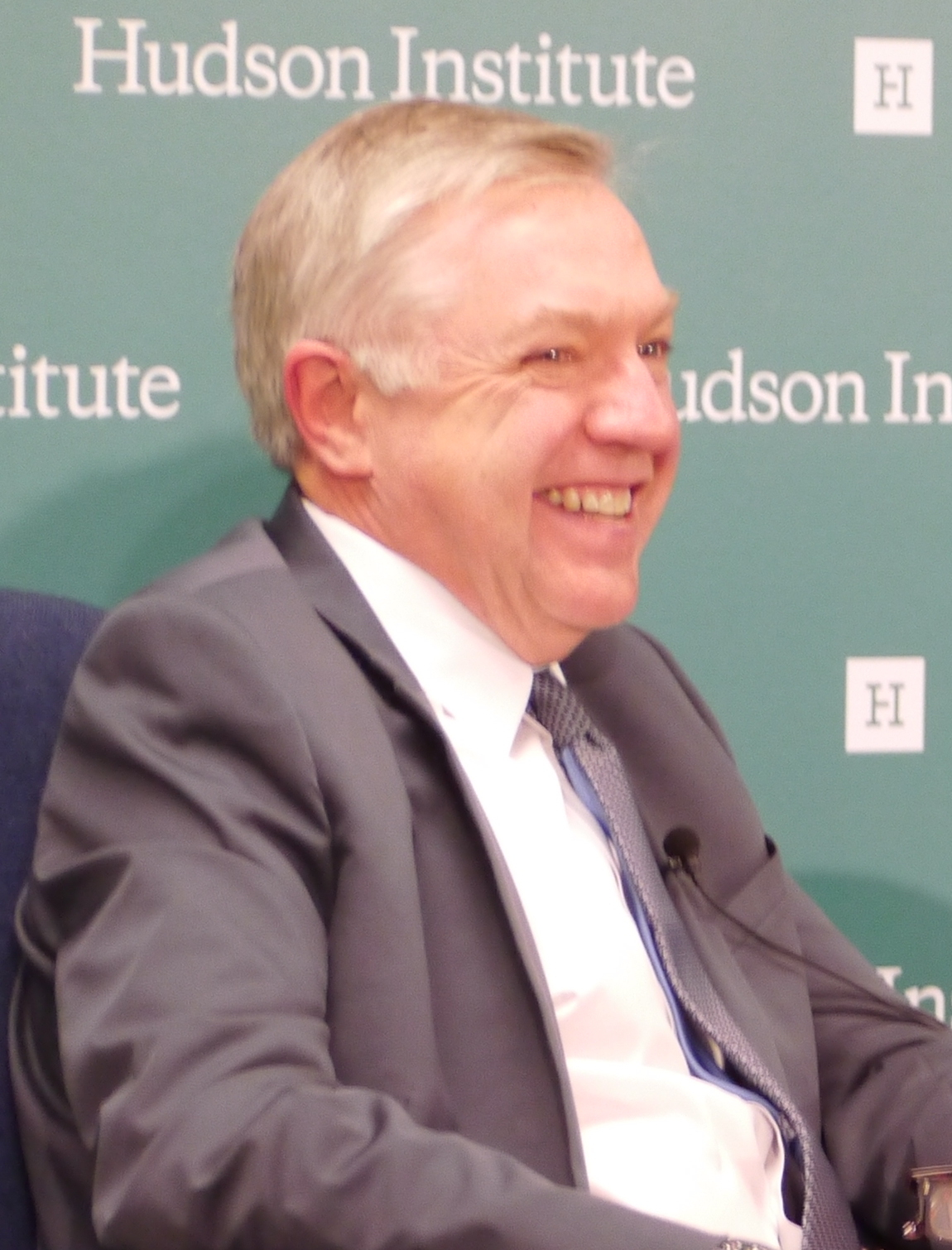
- Born: 1956 (age 69–70)
- Education: University of Minnesota (BA); Johns Hopkins University (MA, PhD); University of Edinburgh
- Occupation: Philosophy professor
- Known for: How the Scots Invented the Modern World (2001)
- Spouse: Beth Marla Warshofsky

Arthur L. Herman (born 1956) is an American popular historian. He was a senior fellow at Hudson Institute.

== Biography ==
Herman's father Arthur L. Herman, a scholar of Sanskrit, was a professor of philosophy at the University of Wisconsin-Stevens Point.

Herman received his B.A. from the University of Minnesota and M.A. and Ph.D. in history from Johns Hopkins University. He spent a semester abroad at The University of Edinburgh in Scotland. His 1984 dissertation research dealt with the political thought of early-17th-century French Huguenots.

In the late 1980s and early 1990s, Herman taught at Sewanee: The University of the South, George Mason University, Georgetown and The Catholic University of America. He was the founder and coordinator of the Western Heritage Program in the Smithsonian's Campus on the Mall lecture series.

His 2001 book on the Scottish Enlightenment, How the Scots Invented the Modern World, was a New York Times bestseller.

In 2008, he added to his body of work Gandhi and Churchill: The Epic Rivalry that Destroyed an Empire and Forged Our Age, a finalist for the 2009 Pulitzer Prize for General Nonfiction.

In 1987, Herman married Beth Marla Warshofsky. He lives in Washington, D.C.

== Views ==
Herman generally employs the great man theory in his work, which is 19th-century historical methodology attributing human events and their outcomes to the singular efforts of great men that has been refined and qualified by such modern thinkers as Sidney Hook.

He did not join the ranks of the so-called declinists after examining the works of Friedrich Nietzsche, Michel Foucault, Henry Adams, Brooks Adams, Oswald Spengler, and Arnold Toynbee, who expressed pessimism about the fate of the West, and remains cautiously optimistic about the future of the Western civilization.

He argues that after passing through the critical era of rapid geopolitical changes in the 20th century driven by an "ideological fervor to transform humanity and create a more perfect world order", the world finally entered in the 21st century into an era of relative stability "defined by the balance-of-power geopolitics."

Herman advocates embracing the U.S. history in its entirety, including the American Civil War, rather than sanitizing it after the fact: "America is a country where the process of conflict and reconciliation, combined with the passage of time, brings out and embeds the qualities that make the United States one people and one community."

== Works ==
External videos
- Presentation by Herman on The Idea of Decline in Western History, March 18, 1997, C-SPAN
- Booknotes interview with Herman on Joseph McCarthy, February 6, 2000, C-SPAN
- Presentation by Herman on How the Scots Invented the Modern World, January 10, 2002, C-SPAN
- Presentation by Herman on To Rule the Waves, November 10, 2004, C-SPAN
- Presentation by Herman on Gandhi and Churchill, May 15, 2008, C-SPAN
- Presentation by Herman on Freedom's Forge, May 14, 2012, C-SPAN
- Q&A interview with Herman on Douglas MacArthur, June 26, 2016, C-SPAN

- The Idea Of Decline In Western History, Free Press, 1997 ISBN 978-0684827919.
- Joseph McCarthy: Reexamining the Life and Legacy of America's Most Hated Senator, Free Press, 1999 ISBN 978-0684836256.
- How the Scots Invented the Modern World: The True Story of How Western Europe's Poorest Nation Created Our World and Everything in It, Three Rivers Press 2002 ISBN 978-0609809990.
- To Rule the Waves: How the British Navy Shaped the Modern World, HarperCollins, 2004 ISBN 978-0060534240.
- Gandhi and Churchill:The Epic Rivalry that Destroyed an Empire and Forged Our Age, Bantam, 2008 ISBN 978-0553804638.
- Freedom's Forge: How American Business produced victory in World War II, 2012 ISBN 978-1400069644
- Herman, Arthur (2014). The Cave and the Light: Plato Versus Aristotle, and the Struggle for the Soul of Western Civilization. Random House Publishing. ISBN 978-0553385663.
- Herman, Arthur L. (2016). Douglas MacArthur: American Warrior. Presidio Press. ISBN 978-0812985108.
- Herman, Arthur (2017). 1917: Lenin, Wilson, and the Birth of the New World Disorder. ISBN 978-0062570888.
- The Viking Heart: How Scandinavians Conquered the World, Houghton Mifflin Harcourt, 2021 ISBN 978-1328595904
- Founder’s Fire: From 1776 to the Age of Trump, Center Street, 2026 ISBN 978-1546011293
