= Humbie Parish Church =

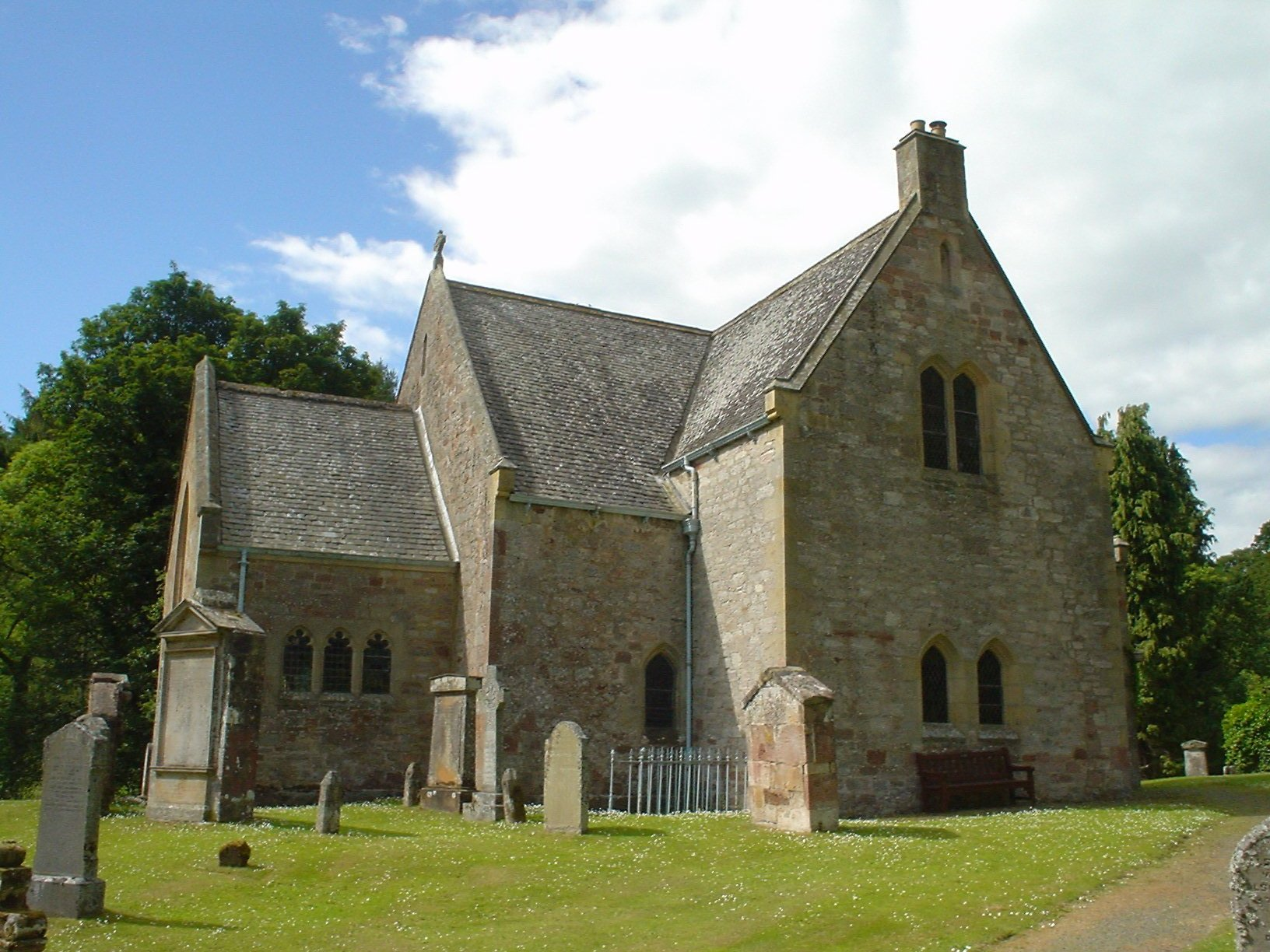
- Humbie Church from the north
- Humbie Parish Church
- 55.8635°N 2.8630°W
- Denomination: Church of Scotland
- Churchmanship: Reformed; presbyterian

Administration
- Parish: Humbie

Humbie Parish Church is a church in the small village of Humbie, East Lothian, Scotland. It is part of the Church of Scotland, and is a linked charge which joins the parishes of Bolton & Saltoun, Yester and Humbie.

The church lies to the north of the main village, set apart at the bottom of a small valley.

== History ==
A church stood on this site prior to the Scottish Reformation. The pre-Reformation parishes of Keith Symons and Keith Hundeby were combined in 1618 to form the combined parishes of Keith and Humbie.

At the time of the Scottish Disruption in 1843, the minister led the congregation out of the church to worship in the open, rather than accept the principle of Patronage (whereby a congregation could not choose its own minister, but was forced to accept the patronage of the local Laird). The church went through successive church unions to belong in turn to the Free Church of Scotland, United Free Church before coming back into the Church of Scotland in 1929.

== Architecture and design ==
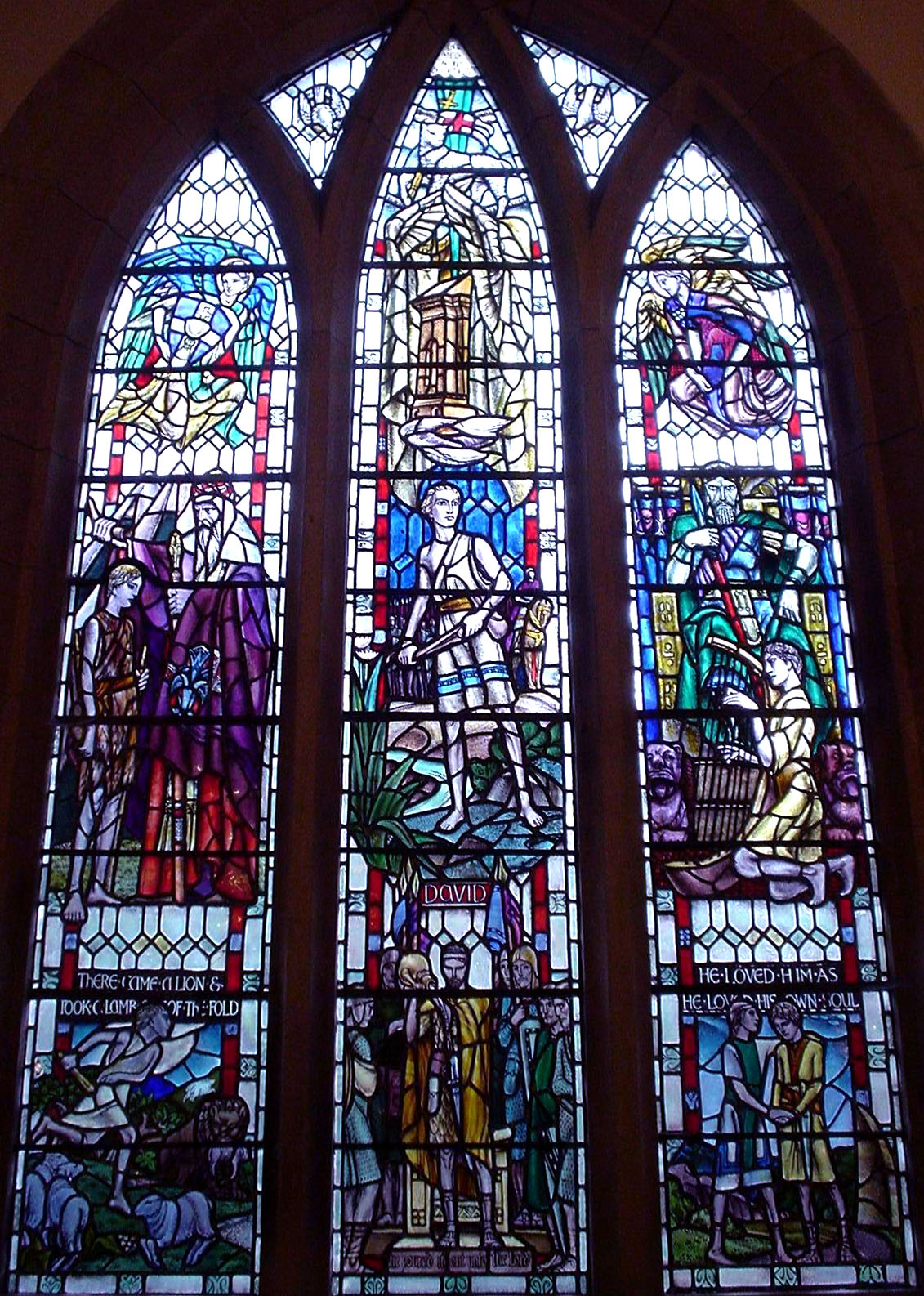
East window, designed by Douglas Strachan

The present building dates to 1800. The original church was typically T-shaped, and south-facing. Alterations were made in 1866 by David Bryce, and in 1932 a chancel was added. At this time the church interior was re-orientated to match liturgical east with geographical east.

In 1950 the original plain-glass east window was replaced with a design by Douglas Strachan, illustrating scenes from the life of King David. Strachan is notable for designing the glass for the Scottish National War Memorial in Edinburgh Castle.

The church is surrounded by an ancient graveyard, still in use today, and described as resassuring a place to be buried as you could wish for...deep in the woods with the burn [river] besides. Some of the still legible gravestones show dates from as early as the 17th century.

In the churchyard is a small building, known as the Broun Aisle, which was built by a local family as their personal burial space in 1864. The Broun family were originally buried inside the church itself, but as a plaque on the building states, this aisle was erected in lieu of the burial place within the church, which, in deference to the parishioners' feelings, has now closed. The aisle itself is now closed, and is used for storage.

== Music ==
At one time a Precentor led the singing in the church from a stall beside the pulpit, until, in 1906, a harmonium was introduced. Today, the music is led by a small one-manual pipe organ, which came from the Norwegian Seamen's Church in Leith, Edinburgh in 1987.

== Notable burials in the Churchyard ==
- Sir Robert Hogg Matthew (1906-1975), leading 20thc. Modernist architect.
- George Waterston (1911-1980) stationer and ornithologist

== See also ==
- List of places in East Lothian
- List of Church of Scotland parishes
