= Saltoun Hall =

Castle in East Lothian, Scotland

Coordinates: 55.9059°N 2.8637°W

Designations

Inventory of Gardens and Designed Landscapes in Scotland
- Official name: Saltoun Hall
- Designated: 30 June 1987
- Reference no.: GDL00336

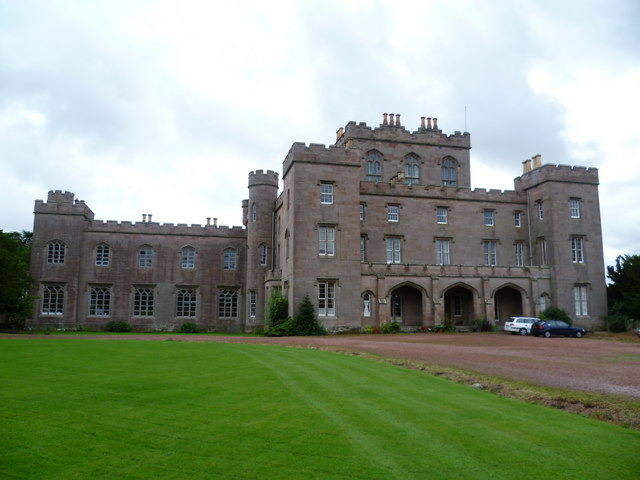
Saltoun Hall

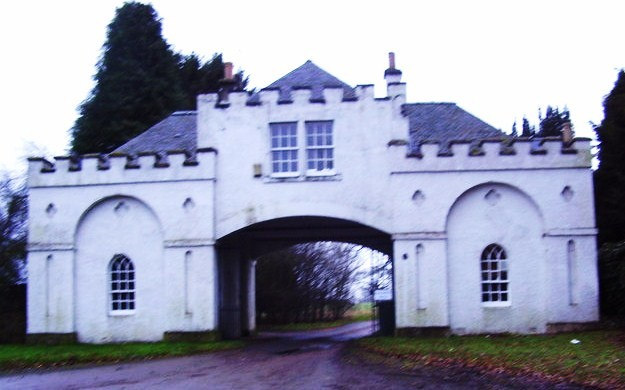
Saltoun Hall North Lodge

Saltoun Hall is an historic house standing in extensive lands off the B6355, Pencaitland to East Saltoun road, about 1.5 miles from each village, in East Lothian, Scotland. The house is reached by way of an impressive gateway and is situated at grid reference NT461685.

== History ==
Saltoun Hall began life, in the 12th century, as a tower or castle and, at that time, was in the hands of the powerful de Morville family. Hugh de Morville was granted lands in the 12th century by King David I at Saltoun and his family were created hereditary High Constables of Scotland. Hugh de Morville was famed for his patronage of religious establishments: he founded Dryburgh Abbey in the old county of Roxburghshire around 1150.

By 1260, Sir William Abernethy owned the lands and castle at Saltoun, and his descendant Sir Lawrence Abernethy was created Lord Saltoun in 1445. The Abernethys were owners at Saltoun for nearly 400 years but in 1643, the estates were bought by Andrew Fletcher, Lord Innerpeffer, to whose family the land still belongs. His grandson Andrew Fletcher of Saltoun (1655–1716) is remembered for his opposition to the Acts of Union 1707.

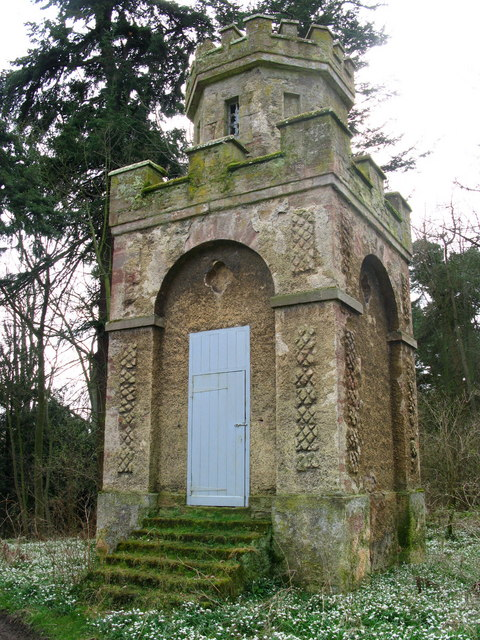
Saltoun Hall Doocot

Over the years, Saltoun Castle was spared trouble and there is only one recorded incident at the castle. In 1548, during Somerset's occupation of Haddington, John Cockburn of Ormiston held the castle for the English commander Grey of Wilton. Cockburn was an 'assured' Scot, one who agreed with the English point of view during the "Rough Wooing" campaign. The castle was quickly retaken in February 1548 by the Earl of Arran, who brought artillery from Edinburgh castle, and hanged 5 of Cockburn's men and took 5 prisoner.

There were many extensions, changes and renewals at the castle but there are no records until the days of the Fletcher family. In 1769, Lord Fletcher added a new wing on the south side of the building. A separate extension was built for the library in 1779. This created an L-shaped house and a 'great stair' was built in the angle. In 1803, architect Robert Burn designed new turrets on the corners giving the 'new' house a castellated appearance. His son, William Burn, completely transformed the building on a large scale in 1817, creating what was described as a 'bleak magnificence'. A large square turret was added. The interior is in the Gothic Revival style, with rib vaulting throughout. A new corridor was built to provide a Gothic gallery and rooms were recast in a Grecian style. The house was sold in the late 1960s and subdivided into apartments. The Fletchers sold the building and some of the estate but the family still live nearby. Today's house owes much to the architectural style of William Burn. The house is said to be haunted by a 'grey lady'.

Saltoun Hall was famed for a formally designed garden in the 19th century. Botanist David McHattie Forbes served as Foreman Forester for the estate from 1883 until his departure for Hawaii in 1887.

== Listed buildings ==
The house is a category A listed building and the doocot is listed at category B.
