= Brunstane =

Suburb of Edinburgh, Scotland

Coordinates: 55°56′52.93″N 3°6′8.29″W

- Location within the City of Edinburgh council area Location within Scotland
- OS grid reference: NT315725
- Community council: Portobello
- Council area: City of Edinburgh
- Lieutenancy area: Edinburgh
- Country: Scotland
- Sovereign state: United Kingdom
- Post town: EDINBURGH
- Postcode district: EH15
- Dialling code: 0131
- Police: Scotland
- Fire: Scottish
- Ambulance: Scottish
- UK Parliament: Edinburgh East
- Scottish Parliament: Edinburgh Eastern

Brunstane (/ˈbrʌnstən/ BRUN-stən) is a northeastern suburb of Edinburgh, Scotland. It lies on the A1 and is served by Brunstane railway station on the Borders Railway. Brunstane partly consists of new housing, such as the Gilberstoun estate, and also contains the 1950s council housing schemes known as Magdalene and the Christians, which are south and north of Milton Road respectively.

== Brunstane House ==
The current house was built in 1639 for the 1st Earl of Lauderdale, incorporating an L-plan house dating from the 1560s and early 14th century elements built for the Crichton family. It was extended by Sir William Bruce in 1672 and bought by Lord Milton in 1733. He employed William Adam to rebuild parts of the house and install interior panelling, plasterwork and other features. The house includes some of the earliest known examples of sash windows in Scotland (invented in 1690).
