= Andrew Fletcher, Lord Innerpeffer =

Scottish judge and Lord of Session (d.1650)

The Right Honourable Lord Innerpeffer

Senator of the College of Justice
- In office 18 December 1623 – 1650
- Appointed by: James VI
- Preceded by: Sir John Wemyss of Craigtoun

Personal details
- Born: Dundee
- Died: 1650
- Relations: Andrew Fletcher (grandson); Andrew Fletcher, Lord Milton (great-grandson)
- Children: Robert; Henry
- Profession: Advocate

Andrew Fletcher, Lord Innerpeffer (died 1650) was a Scottish judge and Lord of Session from 1623 to 1650.

== Life ==
Fletcher was the eldest son of Robert Fletcher of Innerpeffer and Beucleo, Forfarshire, a burgess of Dundee. He succeeded Sir John Wemyss of Craigtoun as an ordinary lord of session, 18 December 1623, and retained his seat in 1626, when many of the lords were displaced. In 1630, he was placed on a commission upon Scots law, and in 1633 was a member of commissions to revise the acts and laws of Scotland with a view to constructing a code, a project which was not proceeded with, and to report upon the jurisdiction of the admiral and chamberlain. He was also ordered to examine Sir Thomas Craig's work Jus Feudale, with a view to its publication. In 1638, he was a commissioner to take subscriptions to the confession of faith of 1580. He was employed in 1639 in regulating the fees of writers to the signet and others, and parliament adopted the scales which he laid down.

On 13 November 1641, Fletcher, with others, was appointed to his judgeship afresh by the king and parliament, and his appointment was objected to by the laird of Moncrieff, upon the ground that he was incapacitated by having purchased lands the subject of litigation before him. The matter was referred to the privy council, and as Fletcher retained his seat the charge was presumably disproved. In the same year he was a commissioner for the plantation of kirks, and about this time was elected member for Forfarshire, but his election was avoided for illegality. He represented the county, however, in parliament in 1646, 1647, and 1648. On 1 February 1645 he was appointed a commissioner of the exchequer, was on the committee of war for Haddingtonshire in 1647, and on the committee of estates for Haddingtonshire and Forfarshire in 1647 and 1648. He was fined £5,000 by the Protector in 1648.

On the question whether conditions should be obtained from the English army on behalf of Charles I, he was one of the four who voted against abandoning the king, and was removed in 1649 from his offices of judge and commissioner of the exchequer, on account of his accession to "the engagement", for the carrying on of which he had subscribed in the previous year £8,500 (Scots), repaid by order of parliament in 1662 after his death to his son Robert. He was also "ordained" to lend money . In March 1650, he died at his house in East Lothian.

== Family ==
Fletcher married a daughter of Peter Hay of Kirkland of Megginch, brother to George Hay, 1st Earl of Kinnoull, by whom he had two sons: Robert, afterwards knighted, who was father of Andrew Fletcher of Saltoun, and Henry, ancestor of the Irish branch of the family.
