= Threipland baronets =

Extinct baronetcy in the Baronetage of Nova Scotia

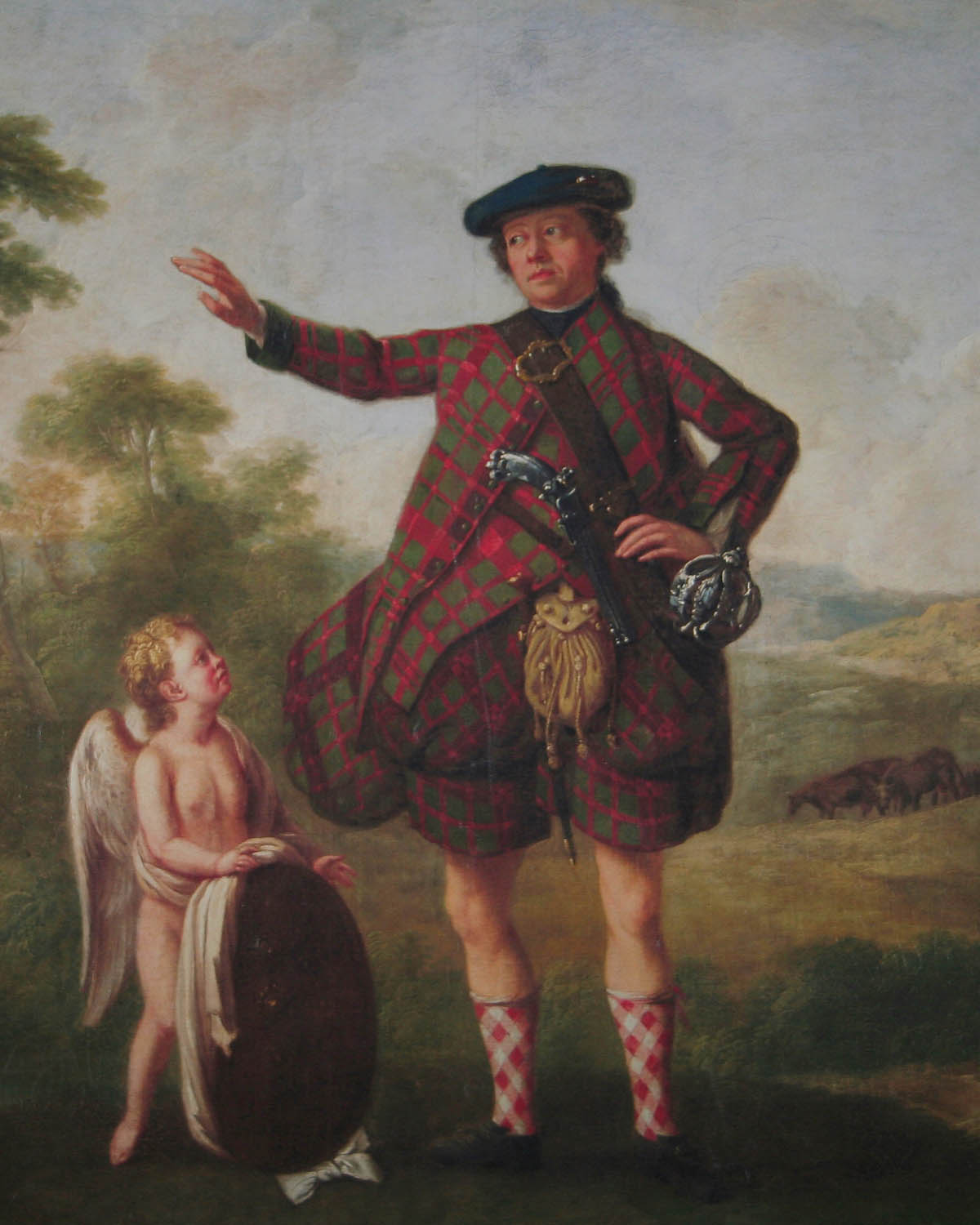
Dr. Sir Stuart Threipland, de jure 3rd Baronet, of Fingask

The Threipland Baronetcy, of Fingask in the County of Perth, was a title in the Baronetage of Nova Scotia. It was created on 10 November 1687 for Patrick Threipland. The second Baronet was attainted in 1715 with the baronetcy forfeited. The de jure third Baronet was physician to Bonnie Prince Charlie during the Jacobite rising of 1745 and President of the Royal Medical Society from 1766 to 1770. In 1826 Patrick Murray Threipland obtained a reversal of the attainder and became the fourth Baronet. On the death of the fifth Baronet in 1882 the title became either extinct or dormant.

The family seat was Fingask Castle, Perthshire.

== Threipland baronets, of Fingask (1687) ==
Escutcheon of the Threipland baronets of Fingask

- Sir Patrick Threipland, 1st Baronet (died 1689)
- Sir David Threipland, 2nd Baronet (died 1746) (attainted 1715)
- Sir Stuart Threipland, de jure 3rd Baronet (1716–1805)
- Sir Patrick Murray Threipland, 4th Baronet (1762–1837) (attainder reversed 1826)
- Sir Patrick Murray Threipland, 5th Baronet (1800–1882)

== Gallery ==
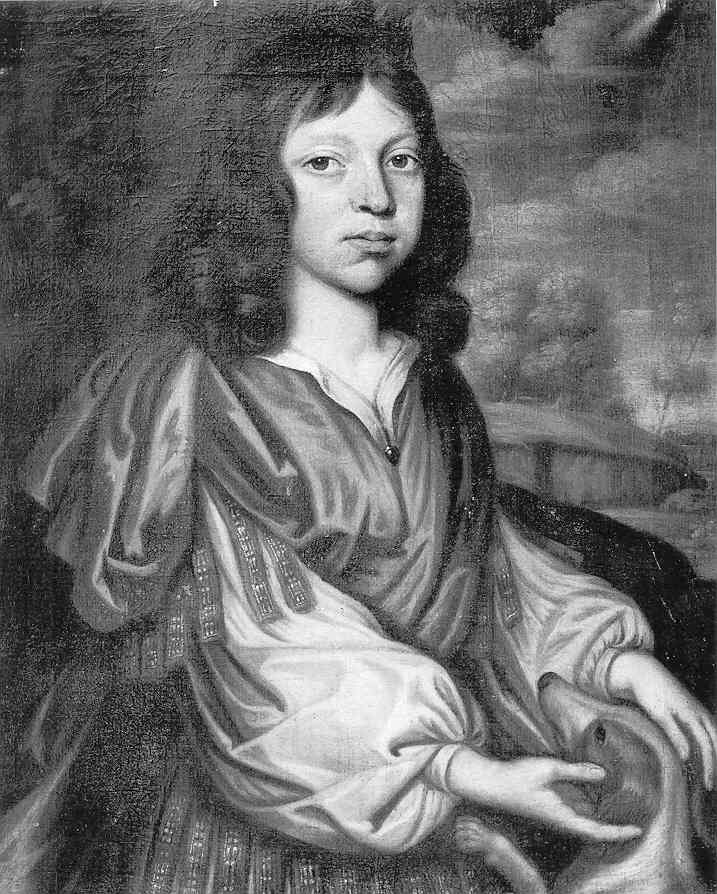
Sir David Threipland, 2nd Bart. (1666–1746).

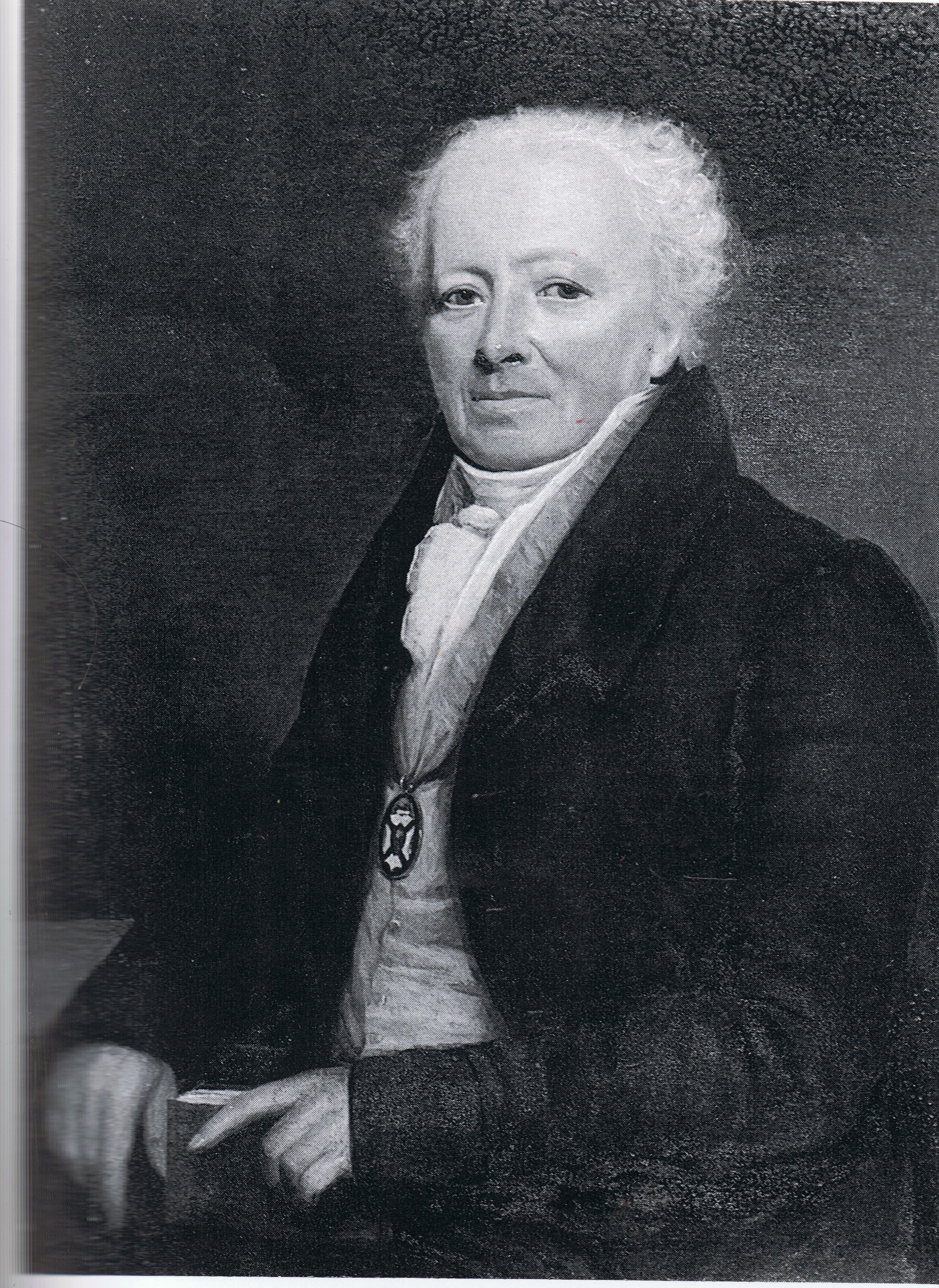
Sir Patrick Budge Murray Threipland, 4th Bart. (1762–1837).

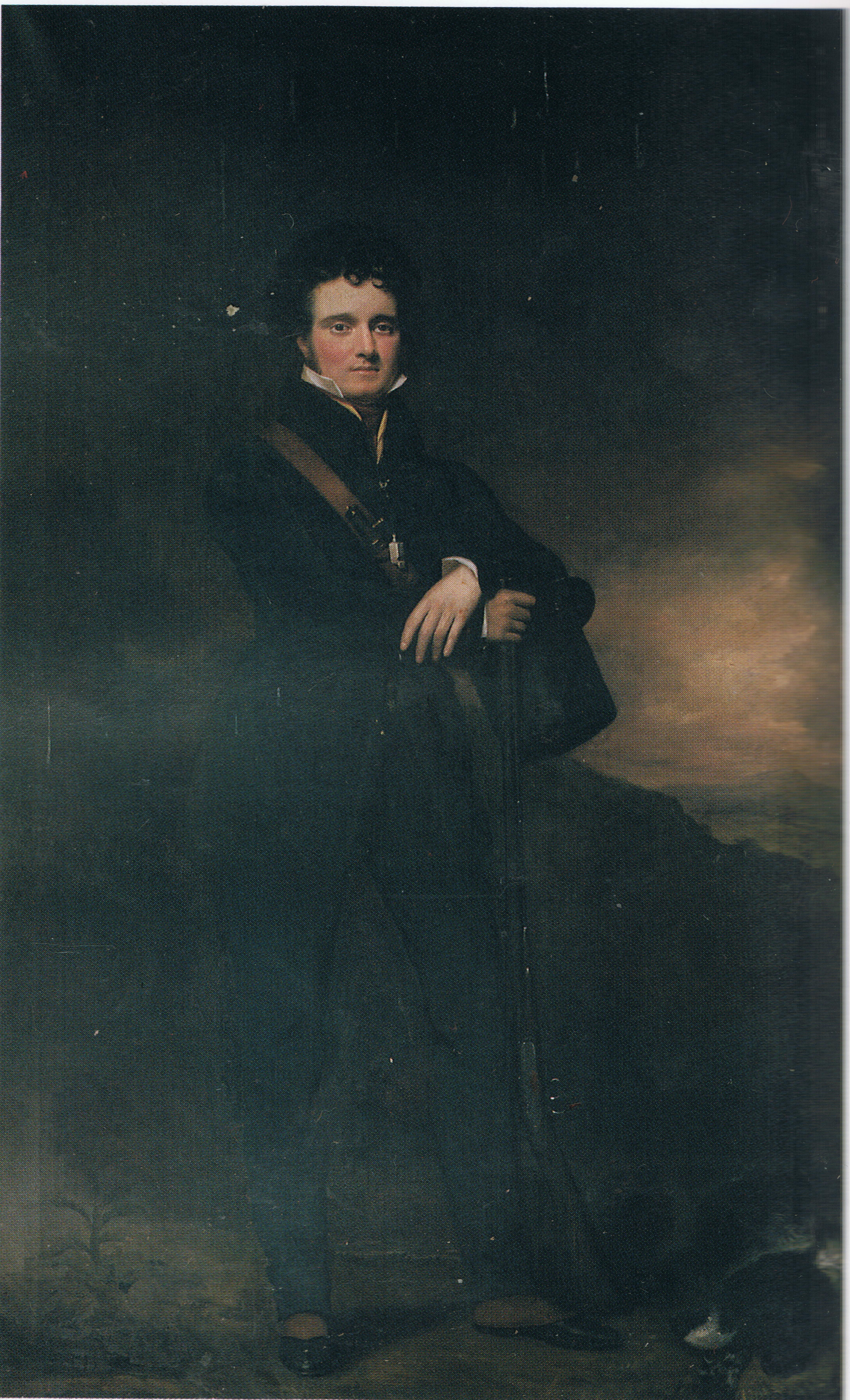
Sir Patrick Murray Threipland, 5th and last Bart. (1800–1882).
