= William Ogilvy =

William Ogilvy (19 September 1793 – 10 April 1871) was a Scottish officer in the British Army, and briefly the Member of Parliament (MP) for Perth Burghs.

He was a younger son of Walter Ogilvy of Clova (died 1819) and his wife Jean, daughter of John Ogilvy MD, of Balfour and Murkl. He was a brother of Hon. Donald Ogilvy.

Ogilvy initially joined the Royal Navy, and disliked it and followed his brothers into the army. He fought in the Peninsula War and at the Battle of Waterloo. He left the army in 1826, and went to live with his brother in Airlie Castle.

In January 1831, he contested a by-election for the Perth Burghs. His rival Francis Jeffrey was returned as the winner, but Ogilvy lodged a petition, and was declared elected on 28 March 1831.

The 1831 general election followed a few weeks later, and Ogilvy began canvassing, but withdrew for lack of support.

Parliament of the United Kingdom
Preceded by Francis Jeffrey	Member of Parliament for Perth Burghs; March 1831 – May 1831	Succeeded by Francis Jeffrey
