= Cupar (Parliament of Scotland constituency) =

Constituency of the Old Parliament of Scotland

Cupar in Fife was a royal burgh that returned one commissioner to the Parliament of Scotland and to the Convention of Estates.

After the Acts of Union 1707, Cupar, Dundee, Forfar, Perth and St Andrews formed the Perth district of burghs, returning one member between them to the House of Commons of Great Britain.

== List of burgh commissioners ==
- 1661: George Turnbull, bailie (died 1662)
- 1662–63: Andrew Paterson
- 1665 convention, 1667 convention: Andrew Paterson of Kilmeny
- 1669–72: John Barclay, dean of guild
- 1678 convention: George Manson, bailie
- 1681–82: Patrick Mortimer, bailie
- 1685–86: Andre Glasford, bailie
- 1689 convention, 1689–90: Robert Melville of Carskeirdoe (died c. 1690)
- 1693–1702: Sir Archibald Muir of Thorntown
- 1702–07: Patrick Bruce of Banzion

== See also ==
- List of constituencies in the Parliament of Scotland at the time of the Union
