= John Drummond (1676–1742) =

Scottish banker, merchant and politician (1676 – 1742)

- Born: 1676
- Died: 20 December 1742 (aged 65–66)
- Occupations: banker merchant politician
- Political party: House of Commons
- Spouse: Agatha Vanderbent
- Father: George Drummond; Elizabeth Ramsay

John Drummond (1676 – 20 December 1742), of Quarrell, Stirling, was a Scottish banker, merchant and politician who sat in the House of Commons from 1727 to 1742.

== Career in the Netherlands ==
Drummond was the third son of George Drummond of Blair Drummond, Perthshire, and his wife Elizabeth Ramsay, daughter of Sir Gilbert Ramsay, 1st Baronet, from Bamff in Perthshire. In 1691 he was sent to Amsterdam with a letter to Andrew Henderson, who specialised in finding places for Scottish boys in Dutch business houses. There he met and befriended James Brydges (later Duke of Chandos), who assisted his career thereafter. After the Peace of Ryswick in 1697, he set up in partnership with a Dutchman, Jan van der Heiden and, for a time, their business in fine goods, coffee, tea, chocolate and wine prospered. By 1709, Drummond had married Agatha Vanderbent of the Netherlands, sister of the Elector of Brandenburgh's agent at Amsterdam With the outbreak of the War of the Spanish Succession, he extended his business to supplying cash to the British Army in the Low Countries and stock-market intelligence to Brydges. He withdrew £5,000 from the business with a view to buying a seat in the British Parliament at a time when the partnership was already over-borrowed and in May 1712 van der Heiden and Drummond defaulted on 100,000 guilders in debts.

After the formation of the Tory ministry in London in 1710, Drummond became the principal source of Dutch intelligence for Robert Harley, 1st Earl of Oxford and Henry St. John, Viscount Bolingbroke.

== Return to Britain ==
Drummond returned to Britain, and was a Commissioner for regulating English trade to the Spanish Netherlands from 1713 to 1714. In 1722 he became a director of the East India Company and assistant of the East African Company. He became Director of the Royal Exchange Assurance Company in 1726.

Drummond was returned as Member of Parliament (MP) for Perth Burghs at the 1727 British general election. In 1732 he ended his directorship of the Royal Exchange Assurance and was appointed Commissioner for settling commerce at Antwerp. He gave up his directorship of the East India Company in 1734. He was returned again for Perth Burghs in 1734 and 1741. He voted with the Administration and often spoke in the House, usually on matters relating to trade.

Drummond died without issue on 20 December 1742.

Parliament of Great Britain
Preceded by William Erskine	Member of Parliament for Perth Burghs; 1727–1742	Succeeded by Thomas Leslie
