= Sir Patrick Threipland, 1st Baronet =

Sir Patrick Threipland, 1st Baronet (died after 18 February 1689) was a Scottish merchant and politician.

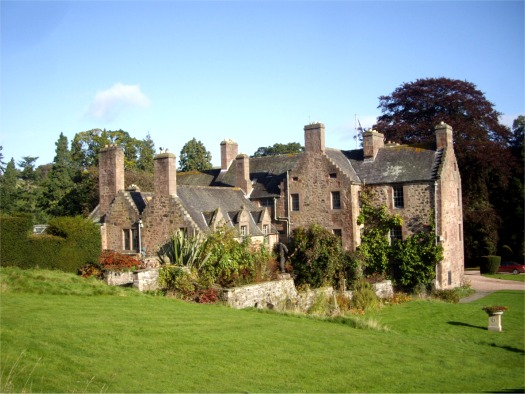
Fingask Castle

He was the son of Andrew Threipland, a burgess of Perth in 1628. A merchant trafficker of Perth, Patrick Threipland served as Treasurer of Perth 1657, Baillie of Perth (1659-62) and Dean of the Guild of Perth (1661), finally being appointed Provost in 1664. He also served as a Member of the Parliament of Scotland for Perth in 1661–63, 1665, 1667, 1669–74.

In 1672 he purchased the Fingask estate, near Errol. On 22 March 1672 a royal charter was granted him containing a new erection of barony of Fingask in his favour, which was ratified by the Scottish Parliament. In 1674 Threipland added the neighbouring Braes of the Carse tower house and estate of Kinnaird to his realm. He was knighted in 1674 for his diligence in the suppression of conventiclers, and was created a baronet of Nova Scotia on 10 November 1687. However, his adherence to the deposed King James VII (James II of England) led to his incarceration at Stirling Castle, where he died in 1689.

He married, on 13 March 1665, Euphemia, daughter of John Conqueror of Friarton, Kirkton Hill, Perth. Their daughter Euphemia was wife to Alexander Rose (d.1720), Bishop of Moray and Edinburgh. Their son David (c.1670–1746) succeeded as 2nd Baronet, although he lost his titles after taking part in the Jacobite rising of 1715.

Baronetage of Nova Scotia
New creation	Baronet (of Fingask); 1687–1689	Succeeded by David Threipland
