= Perth Burghs (UK Parliament constituency) =

Parliamentary constituency in the United Kingdom, 1801–1832

- Former district of burghs constituency for the House of Commons
- Major settlements: Perth, Cupar, St Andrews, Dundee, Forfar

1708–1832
- Created from: Cupar, Dundee, Forfar, Perth, St Andrews
- Replaced by: Perth and 3 others

Perth Burghs was a district of burghs constituency of the House of Commons of the Parliament of Great Britain (at Westminster) from 1708 to 1801 and of the Parliament of the United Kingdom (also at Westminster) from 1801 until 1832, representing a seat for one Member of Parliament (MP).

== Creation ==
The British parliamentary constituency was created in 1708 following the Acts of Union, 1707 and replaced the former Parliament of Scotland burgh constituencies of Perth, Cupar, Dundee, Forfar and St Andrews.

== Boundaries ==
The constituency covered five burghs: Perth in the county of Perth, Cupar and St Andrews in the county of Fife, and Dundee and Forfar in the county of Forfar.

== History ==
The constituency elected one Member of Parliament (MP) by the first past the post system until the seat was abolished for the 1832 general election.

For the 1832 general election, as a result of the Representation of the People (Scotland) Act 1832, the burgh of Perth was merged into the new Perth burgh constituency, the burghs of Cupar and St Andrews were merged into the Fife county constituency, the burgh of Dundee was merged into the new Dundee burgh constituency, and the burgh of Forfar was merged into the new Montrose Burghs constituency.

== Members of Parliament ==
Election	Member	Party	Notes
1708	Joseph Austin		
1710	George Yeaman		
1715	Patrick Haldane		
1722	William Erskine		
1727	John Drummond		
1743 by-election	Thomas Leslie		
1761	George Dempster		
1768	William Pulteney later 5th Baronet	Whig	also returned for Cromartyshire, for which he chose to sit
1769 by-election	George Dempster	Independent Whig	
1790	George Murray		
1796 by-election	David Scott		
1805 by-election	Sir David Wedderburn, Bt	Tory	Postmaster-General for Scotland 1823–31
1818	Archibald Campbell		
1820	Hon. Hugh Lindsay		
1830	John Stuart-Wortley	Tory	later Baron Wharncliffe
Jan 1831 by-election	Francis Jeffrey		later Lord Jeffrey
Mar 1831 petition	William Ogilvy		
May 1831	Francis Jeffrey	Whig	later Lord Jeffrey
1832	constituency abolished		

== Election results ==
The electoral system for this constituency gave each of the five burghs one vote, with an additional casting vote (to break ties) for the burgh where the election was held. The place of election rotated amongst the burghs in successive Parliaments. The vote of a burgh was exercised by a burgh commissioner, who was elected by the burgh councillors.

The normal order of rotation for this district was Perth, Dundee, St Andrews, Cupar and Forfar. However the Court of Session had the power to suspend the participation of a burgh, as a punishment for corruption, which could disrupt the rotation if the normal returning burgh was not able to participate.

At the time of the disputed elections in 1830 and 1831, Dundee was not able to take part in the voting. Although Dundee was not the returning burgh for the 1830-31 Parliament, its absence made the elections less certain and encouraged wrongdoing by candidates.

The reference to some candidates as Non Partisan does not, necessarily, mean that they did not have a party allegiance. It means that the sources consulted did not specify a party allegiance. The sources used were Stooks Smith as well as Namier and Brooke (see the References section for further details).

=== Elections in the 18th century ===
General election 1708: Perth Burghs (election at Perth)
Party	Candidate	Votes	%	±%
Nonpartisan	Joseph Austin	Unopposed	N/A	N/A
Nonpartisan gain from new seat		Swing	N/A	

=== Elections in the 1710s ===
General election 1710: Perth Burghs (election at Dundee)
Party	Candidate	Votes	%	±%
Nonpartisan	George Yeaman	Unopposed	N/A	N/A
Nonpartisan hold		Swing	N/A	

General election 1713: Perth Burghs (election at St Andrews)
Party	Candidate	Votes	%	±%
Nonpartisan	George Yeaman	Unopposed	N/A	N/A
Nonpartisan hold		Swing	N/A	

General election 1715: Perth Burghs (election at Cupar)
Party	Candidate	Votes	%	±%
Nonpartisan	Patrick Haldane	Unopposed	N/A	N/A
Nonpartisan hold		Swing	N/A	

=== Elections in the 1720s ===
General election 1722: Perth Burghs (election at Forfar)
Party	Candidate	Votes	%	±%
Nonpartisan	William Erskine	Returned and seated	N/A	N/A
Nonpartisan	Charles Leslie	Returned and unseated	N/A	N/A
Nonpartisan hold		Swing	N/A	

- This election resulted in a double return of both candidates. The House of Commons seated Erskine.

General election 1727: Perth Burghs (election at Perth)
Party	Candidate	Votes	%	±%
Nonpartisan	John Drummond	Unopposed	N/A	N/A
Nonpartisan hold		Swing	N/A	

=== Elections in the 1730s ===
General election 1734: Perth Burghs (election at Dundee)
Party	Candidate	Votes	%	±%
Nonpartisan	John Drummond	Unopposed	N/A	N/A
Nonpartisan hold		Swing	N/A	

=== Elections in the 1740s ===
General election 1741: Perth Burghs (election at St Andrews)
Party	Candidate	Votes	%	±%
Nonpartisan	John Drummond	Unopposed	N/A	N/A
Nonpartisan hold		Swing	N/A	

- December 1743: Death of Drummond
