= Stuart Threipland =

Scottish physician

Sir Stuart Threipland MD, FRCPE
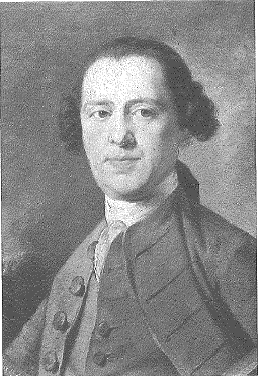
- Sir Stuart Threipland, de jure 3rd Baronet, of Fingask. Portrait by William Delacour
- Born: 18 May 1716; Perthshire, Scotland
- Died: 1805 (aged 88–89); Edinburgh, Scotland
- Medical career
- Profession: Physician-in-chief to Prince Charles Edward Stuart; President Royal College of Physicians of Edinburgh

Stuart Threipland MD, FRCPE (18 May 1716 – 1805) was a Scottish physician. He was the son of Sir David Threipland, the second baronet of Fingask and, like his father, was an active Jacobite. After qualifying MD from the University of Edinburgh in 1742 he became a fellow of the Royal College of Physicians of Edinburgh (RCPE) two years later. In 1745 he joined Prince Charles Edward Stuart in the Jacobite rising. He became physician-in-chief to the prince and stayed with the army throughout the campaign. After the Jacobite defeat at Culloden in April 1746 he went into exile in France but was able to return to Scotland under the Indemnity Act 1747. When his father died in 1746 he succeeded to become de jure the third baronet of Fingask but was technically unable to use the title which had been forfeited by his father because of his support for the Jacobite cause. He practised as a physician in Edinburgh and was elected president of the RCPE in 1766. In 1783 he was able to buy back most of the family estates in Fingask and Kinnaird which had been confiscated from his father in 1715.

== Early life ==
He was born in Fingask Castle to Sir David Threipland, Bart. (1666–1746), second baronet of Fingask, Perthshire, and his wife Katharine (née Smythe). At the time the castle was occupied by Hanoverian troops, and his father was in hiding nearby. His father had been an active supporter of the 1715 Jacobite Rising, during which he had been captured by the government army but had escaped and gone into hiding. His family estates were confiscated, and he was stripped of his baronetcy. Stuart Threipland studied medicine at the University of Edinburgh and in 1737 became one of the founder members of the Medical Society of Edinburgh, later the Royal Medical Society. He graduated as a Doctor of Medicine in 1742, and in 1744 he became a fellow of the Royal College of Physicians of Edinburgh (FRCPE) and began practice as a physician in the city.

== Service in the 1745 Jacobite Rising ==
Threipland came from a staunchly Jacobite family, and his forename, spelt "Stuart", was a mark of the family's devotion to that cause. When Prince Charles Edward Stuart raised his standard at Glenfinnan on 19 August 1745, he and his brother David joined his army. David Threipland died of a gunshot wound at the Battle of Prestonpans in September 1745. Stuart Threipland remained with the prince throughout the campaign becoming his physician-in-chief. He was with the Jacobite army as they marched south as far as Derby, remaining with them on the retreat north into Scotland, and he was present at the Battle of Culloden. After the defeat at Culloden he went into hiding with the prince in the Highlands of Scotland. On one occasion they hid in a cave in Badenoch, where Threipland cared for another Jacobite fugitive and doctor Archibald Cameron of Locheil, who was later captured and hanged at Tyburn for his part in the rising. Assuming the disguise of a Presbyterian minister Threipland reached Edinburgh. There he changed his disguise to that of a printer's devil or apprentice and made his way to England. From there he escaped to France, where he joined Prince Charles Edward in exile in Paris.

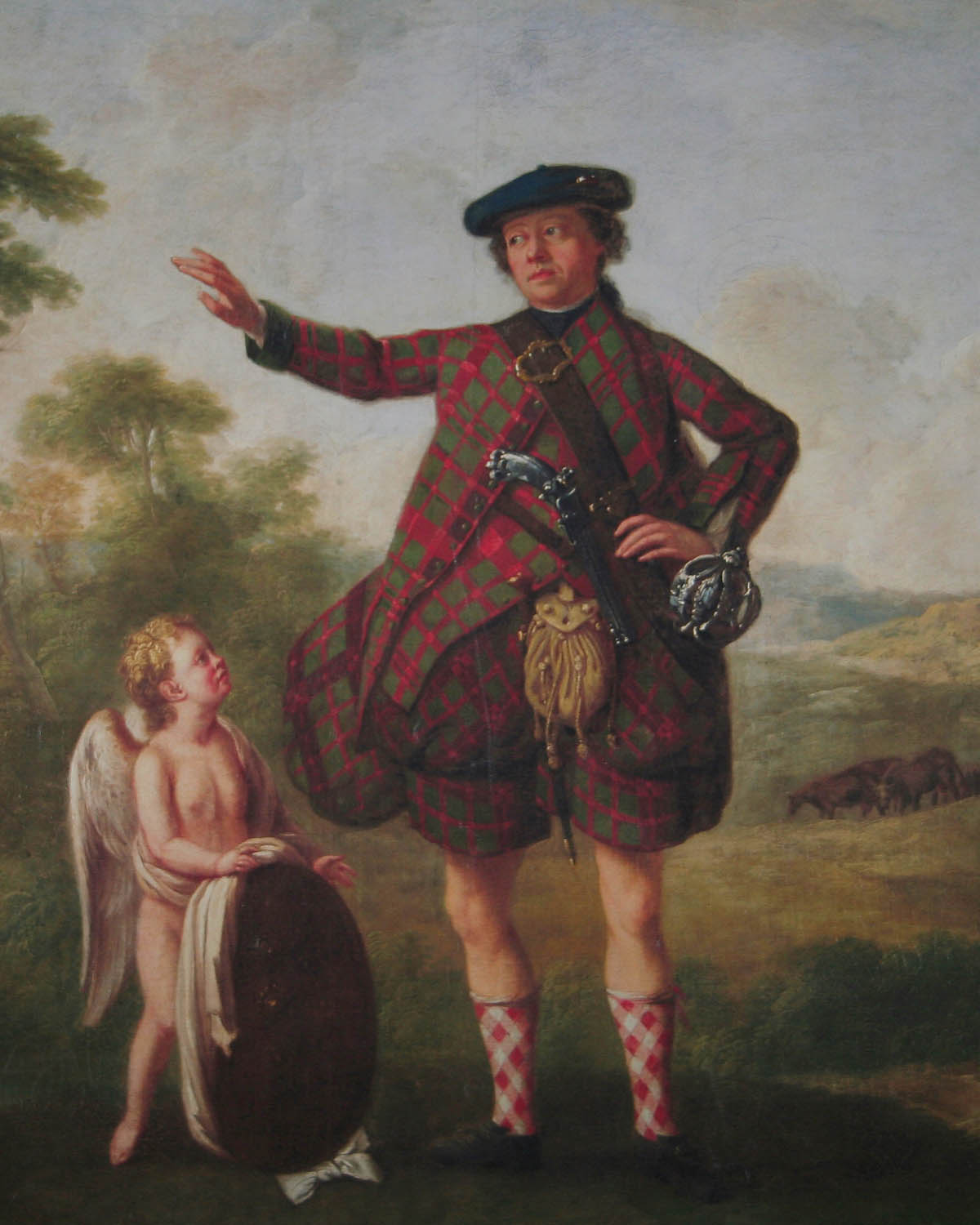
Stuart Threipland (1716 - 1805). Detail from a portrait by William Delacour. The cherubic figure to his right is thought to represent a 'guardian angel' which saved him from capture after the 1745 Jacobite Rising.

== Later life ==
He was able to return to Scotland in 1747 or 1748 under the Act of Indemnity of 1747. He resumed his practice as a physician in Edinburgh and was elected president of the Royal College of Physicians of Edinburgh on 4 December 1766. When his father died in 1746 he became de jure the third baronet of Fingask but was technically unable to use the title during his lifetime. He lived at Fountain Close, close to the site of the first Hall of the Royal College of Physicians, and from 1771 in Chessel's Court in the Canongate. In later years he spent his summers at his villa at Moredun, south of Edinburgh and the winter months at his apartment in Horse Wynd, off the Canongate. Later he stayed at the Bishop's Land, a large dwelling in the High Street. His practice was a successful one and enabled him in 1783 to buy back most of the family estates in Fingask and Kinnaird that had been confiscated in 1715.

He died at Edinburgh in 1805.

== Family ==
He married his first wife, Janet Sinclair, in 1753, and after her death he married Janet Budge-Murray in 1761. When Stuart Threipland died in 1805, Patrick, the eldest of their six children, inherited the baronetcy, and the title was formally restored in 1826 by Act of Parliament.

== Threipland's medicine chest ==
The medicine chest is thought to have been given to Threipland by Prince Charles Edward Stuart. The later provenance of the chest has been documented. Threipland donated it to the surgeon Alexander Wood (1725–1807), and his son Dr George Wood left it to a Dr John Smith. He presented it to the RCPE. It is 10 inches square. The chest contains 147 preparations, most of which are in glass bottles. These include "gums, ointments, powders, balsams and pills". When the chest was in use medicine was dominated by the theory of humours. This involved the use of purgatives, emetics, and enemas, and many of the preparations in the chest are intended to produce such effects. Most of the preparations are vegetable-based, but the increasing use of chemically based drugs in the mid-18th century is demonstrated by the presence of "borax, potassium acid tartarate, dilute sulphuric acid, calamine, zinc oxide and lead acetate". In addition to the drugs, there were compartments for mortar and pestle, scales with weights, scissors, forceps, spatula, suturing needles, paper, and pens.

Threipland's medicine chest closed

Threipland's medicine chest opened showing drawers

Threipland's medicine chest opened showing compartments

Threipland's medicine chest fully opened showing all compartments
