= St Andrews (Parliament of Scotland constituency) =

Parliament of Scotland constituency

St Andrews in Fife was a royal burgh that returned one commissioner to the Parliament of Scotland and to the Convention of Estates.

After the Acts of Union 1707, St Andrews, Cupar, Dundee, Forfar and Perth formed the Perth district of burghs, returning one member between them to the House of Commons of Great Britain.

== List of burgh commissioners ==
- 1661–63: Andrew Carstairs, dean of guild
- 1665 convention: Robert Lentron, provost
- 1667 convention, 1669–74, 1678 convention: John Geddie of St Nicholas, provost
- 1681–82, 1685–86: John Aesone, former provost
- 1689 convention, 1689–1702: James Smith, merchant
- 1702–07: Alexander Warson of Aithernie

== See also ==
- List of constituencies in the Parliament of Scotland at the time of the Union
