= Thomas Leslie =

British Army officer and Scottish politician

Thomas Leslie (c. 1701–1772), of Stenton, Fife, was a British Army officer and Scottish politician who sat in the House of Commons between 1734 and 1761.

== Early life ==
Leslie was the third son of John Leslie, 9th Earl of Rothes and his wife Lady Jean Hay, daughter of John Hay, 2nd Marquess of Tweeddale He was educated privately and joined the army and was an ensign in the 26th Foot in 1717

== Career ==
Leslie's father who was sheriff at the 1722 British general election, returned his son for Dysart Burghs but it was a double return and the seat was awarded by the Commons to his opponent, Leslie was a lieutenant in the 2nd Dragoons in 1726 and was on half-pay in 1729. At the 1734 British general election, he was returned successfully as Member of Parliament for Dysart Burghs. He voted with the Opposition on the Spanish convention in 1739 and on the place bill in 1740. He did not stand at the 1741 British general election. In 1741 he became a captain in the 46th Foot and in October 1742 was appointed equerry to the Prince of Wales.

Leslie was returned on his family's interest for as MP for Perth Burghs at a by-election 20 January 1743. Following his cousin Lord Tweeddale, he voted with the Government on the Hanoverians in 1744. He served against the rebels in the Forty-five rebellion, when he was wounded and captured at the Battle of Prestonpans. In 1746, he was classed as a follower of Tweeddale's friend, Granville. By 1747 Leslie had transferred his allegiance to Pelham. Later that year he applied to Newcastle for the post of barrack master: He was appointed barrack master for Scotland, with the rank of colonel, in 1748 and held it until 1768.

Pelham helped to secure Leslie's re-election for Perth at the 1754 British general election but by this time he was in financial difficulties. Pelham died and over the next few years Leslie plied Newcastle with s string of further appeals for financial assistance which Newcastle sometimes granted. Leslie eventually lost his seat at the 1761 British general election.

== Family and legacy ==
Leslie made a secret marriage in around 1753. He died on 17 March 1772 leaving a daughter. Family in carter Kentucky named after him

Parliament of Great Britain
Preceded by James St Clair	Member of Parliament for Dysart Burghs; 1734–1741	Succeeded by James Oswald
Preceded by John Drummond	Member of Parliament for Perth Burghs; 1743–1761	Succeeded by George Dempster
