= Patrick Haldane =

Scottish classicist, advocate, politician and judge (1683–1769)

Rev Patrick Haldane of Gleneagles MP (1683–1769) was a Scottish classicist, advocate, politician and judge.

== Life ==
He was born the second son of John Haldane of Gleneagles, M.P., and the younger brother of Mungo Haldane. He was educated at St. Andrews University (1699), Leyden University (1711) and qualified as an advocate in 1715. He succeeded his brother Mungo Haldane as 16th Laird of Gleneagles in 1759.

He was Professor of Greek at St. Andrews University in 1705-07 and professor of ecclesiastical history there in 1707-18. He was a commissioner of the equivalent in 1715-16, provost of St. Andrews from 1716 to 1720, commissioner for forfeited estates from 1716–25, and a commissioner of excise in 1724-27. He was appointed joint solicitor-general in Scotland for 1746-55 and served as the first crown-appointed sheriff-depute for Perthshire from 1746.

He was elected Member of Parliament for Perth Burghs in 1715, sitting until 1722.

He died at Duddingston on 10 January 1769.

== Family ==
He had married before 1721, Margaret Forrester, the daughter of William Forrester, 4th Lord Forrester of Corstorphine, and had a son and a daughter. Their son was Colonel George Haldane, a professional soldier, Governor of Jamaica and MP.

Parliament of Great Britain
Preceded by George Yeaman	Member of Parliament for Perth Burghs; 1715 – 1722	Succeeded by William Erskine
Legal offices
Preceded by Robert Dundas of Arniston	Solicitor General for Scotland; 1746 – 1755; With: Alexander Hume	Succeeded by Andrew Pringle
