= George Dempster of Dunnichen =

Scottish advocate, landowner, agronomist, and politician (1732–1818)

George Dempster of Dunnichen FRSE FSA (Scot)
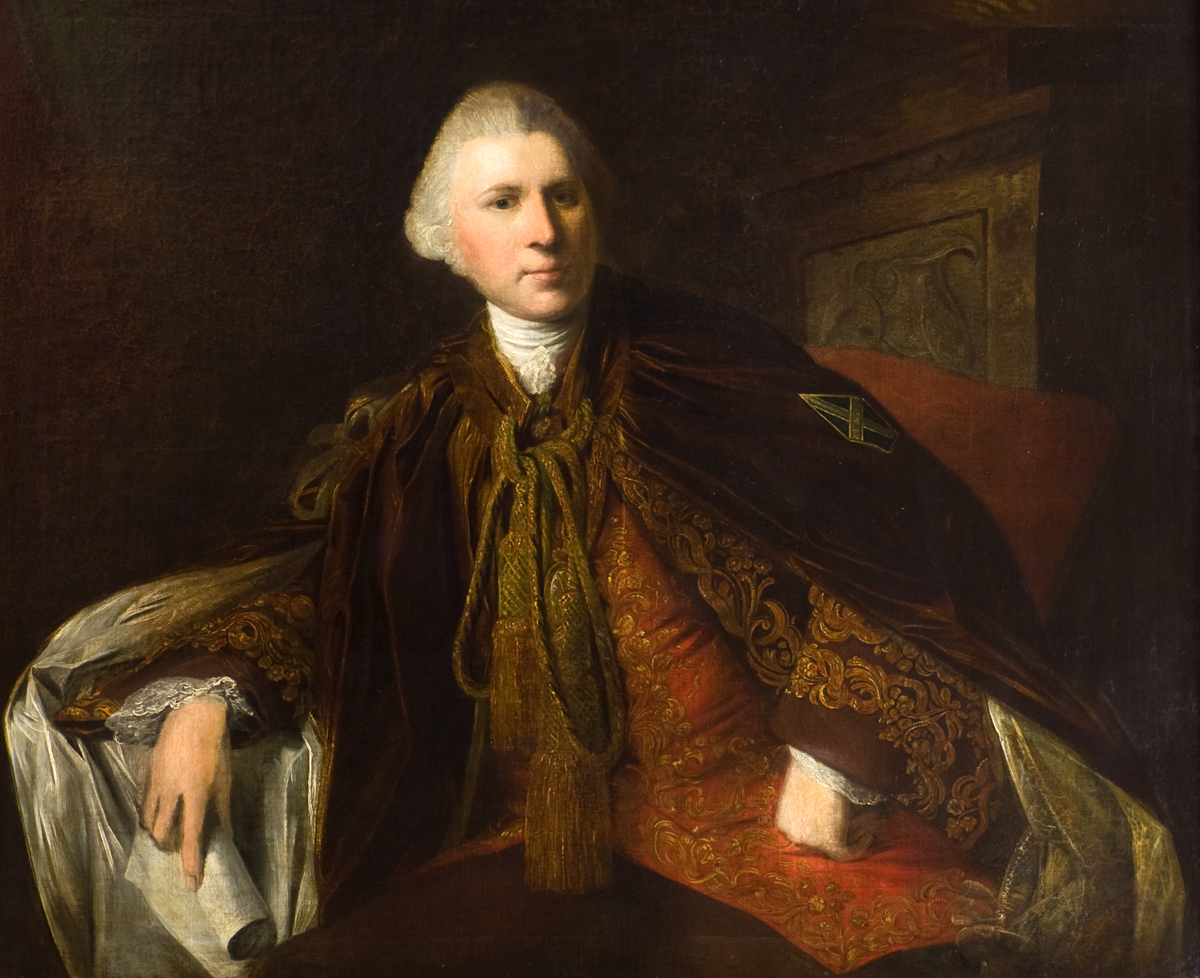
- George Dempster, portrait by George Willison

Member of Parliament for Perth Burghs
- In office 1769–1790
- Preceded by: William Pulteney
- Succeeded by: George Murray

Member of Parliament for Perth Burghs
- In office 1761–1768
- Preceded by: Thomas Leslie
- Succeeded by: William Pulteney

Personal details
- Born: 1732 Dundee, Great Britain
- Died: 1818 (aged 86) Dunnichen, Angus, Great Britain
- Resting place: Restenneth Priory, Forfar
- Party: Independent Whig
- Spouse: Rose Heming [1748-1810]
- Education: University of St Andrews; University of Edinburgh; Académie Royale
- Profession: Politician

George Dempster of Dunnichen and Skibo FRSE FSA (Scot) (1732–1818) was a Scottish advocate, landowner, agricultural improver and politician who sat in the House of Commons between 1761 and 1790. Dempster founded the bank George Dempster & Co. (also known as the Dundee Banking Company) in 1763, was a Director of the East India Company from 1769, and served as Provost of St Andrews (1780) and a Director of the Highland Society of Scotland (1789).

Dempster, nicknamed Honest George, was a key figure of the Scottish Enlightenment and respected as an "independently minded, incorruptible and moderately radical MP". He dedicated the later years of his life to improving Scottish fishing and agriculture and improving the living conditions of his tenants.

He was a lifelong friend of the philosopher Adam Ferguson and the minister Alexander Carlyle.

== Life and work ==
George Dempster was born in 1732 in Dundee, the son of John Dempster 2nd Laird of Dunnichen (near Forfar), a Dundee merchant, and Isabel Ogilvie. George's date of birth is unclear, and has alternatively been given as 8 February or 8 December. He was educated at Dundee Grammar School (c1739–c1748) and possibly also at the small parish school at Leuchars, Fife. On 24 February 1748 he entered the University of St Andrews and studied there until about 1750, when he left without taking a degree and moved on to study law at the University of Edinburgh. He also studied at the Académie Royale in Brussels.

Dempster was admitted to the Faculty of Advocates in 1755; and about the same time became a member of the Select Society, later becoming a director of this pre-eminent literary and intellectual society of the Scottish Enlightenment. In 1762 he joined the Poker Club of Edinburgh, and may have been a co-founder of this influential body,

He, Andrew Erskine, and James Boswell were joint authors and a "triumvirate of wit", although he later regretted at least one of their attacks, the Critical Strictures on the New Tragedy of Elvira, as he believed the tragedy was better than anything he or his co-authors could have done.

He served as Member of Parliament for the Perth Burghs (1761-8 and 1769–90).

Dempster was elected a Fellow of the Royal Society of Edinburgh in 1788, upon the proposal of Dr Thomas Anderson, Henry Duncan and John Playfair.

He died at Dunnichen, Angus, on 13 February 1818, and was interred at Restenneth Priory, Forfar.

He appears as a character in the annual Kate Kennedy Procession in St Andrews, currently usually played by Callum MacLeod, the first modern Provost of St Andrews.

Parliament of Great Britain
| Preceded by Thomas Leslie | Member of Parliament for Perth Burghs; 1761–1768 | Succeeded by William Pulteney |
| Preceded by William Pulteney | Member of Parliament for Perth Burghs; 1769–1790 | Succeeded by George Murray |
