= George Murray (Royal Navy officer, born 1741) =

British naval officer and politician (1741–1797)

Vice-Admiral George Murray
- Born: 22 August 1741; Tullibardine, Perthshire
- Died: 17 October 1797 (aged 56); Hunton, Kent
- Burial place: Ockham, Surrey
- Spouse: Wilhelmina King (m. 1784–1795)
- Military career
- Allegiance: Great Britain
- Branch: Royal Navy
- Service years: 1758–1797
- Rank: Vice-admiral
- Commands: HMS Ferret; HMS Renown; HMS Adventure; HMS Levant; HMS Cleopatra; HMS Irresistible; HMS Defence; HMS Vengeance; Nore Command; HMS Duke; HMS Glory; North American Station
- Conflicts: Seven Years' War; Raid on St Malo; American Revolutionary War; Battle of Dogger Bank; French Revolutionary Wars

Vice-Admiral George Murray (22 August 1741 – 17 October 1797) was a Royal Navy officer and politician. He was the third son of the Jacobite general Lord George Murray.

== Naval career ==
Murray joined the Royal Navy in 1758 as a midshipman. In 1765 he became commander of the sloop HMS Ferret. Promoted captain he commanded HMS Renown, HMS Adventure, HMS Levant and HMS Cleopatra. He commanded the Cleopatra at the Battle of Dogger Bank in 1781. From 1782 he commanded HMS Irresistible.

He was elected Member of Parliament for Perth burghs in 1790 but gave up his seat in 1796. Resuming his naval career he commanded HMS Defence from 1790. He was appointed Commander-in-Chief at Chatham in 1792 and went on to command HMS Duke and then HMS Glory. He was made Commander-in-Chief, North American Station in 1794, establishing a permanent Royal Naval base at St. George's Town, at the East End of Bermuda (an insular colony in British North America), with Admiralty House at Rose Hill, the ships of the squadron reaching Murray's Anchorage (named for him) in the lagoon enclosed by Bermuda's barrier reach via the newly discovered Hurd's Channel, and with various sites around the town acquired by the navy, including Convict Bay (below Barrack Hill at St. George's Garrison), Admiralty Island, and Naval Tanks (acquisition of land at Bermuda's West End also began in the 1790s for the longer term goal of the navy was the construction of the Royal Naval Dockyard with which Bermuda was to be elevated to an Imperial fortress). He almost completely cleared North American waters of French men-of-war and privateers. He returned to England in 1796 and died the following year.

== Family ==
In 1784 he married Wilhelmina King, daughter of Thomas King, 5th Baron King; they had no children.

Parliament of Great Britain
Preceded by George Dempster	Member of Parliament for Perth Burghs; 1790–1796	Succeeded by David Scott
Military offices
Preceded by Sir Richard Hughes	Commander-in-Chief, North American Station; 1793–1796	Succeeded by George Vandeput
