= Francis Jeffrey, Lord Jeffrey =

Scottish judge and literary critic

The Honourable Lord Jeffery
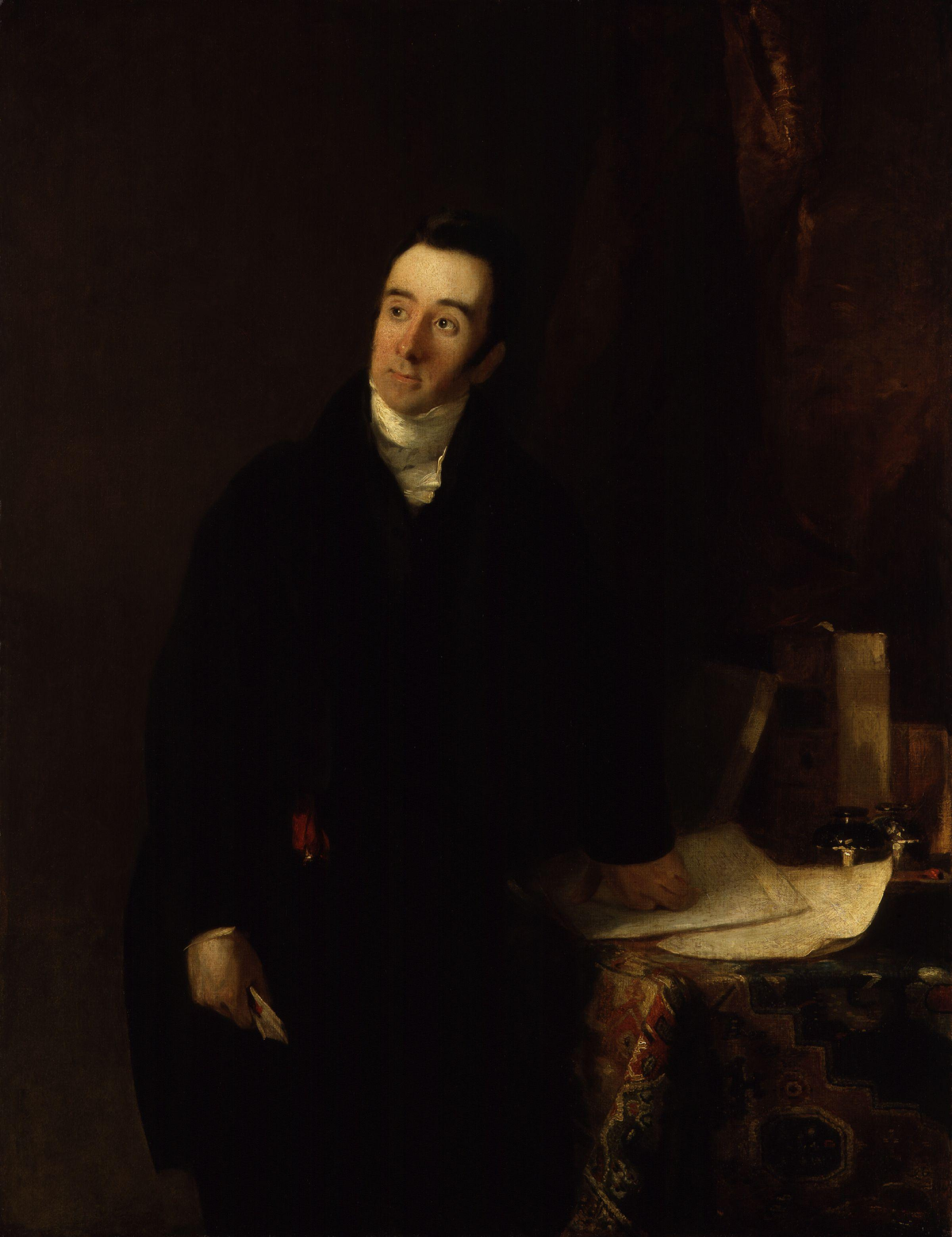
- An 1820 portrait of Lord Jeffrey by Andrew Geddes

Member of Parliament for Edinburgh
- In office 1832–1834 Serving with James Abercromby
- Preceded by: Robert Adam Dundas
- Succeeded by: James Abercromby; Sir John Campbell

Member of Parliament for Perth Burghs
- In office 1831–1832
- Preceded by: William Ogilvy
- Succeeded by: Constituency abolished

Member of Parliament for Malton
- In office April 1831 – July 1831 Serving with John Charles Ramsden; Henry Gally Knight
- Preceded by: Sir James Scarlett; John Charles Ramsden
- Succeeded by: Lord Cavendish; Henry Gally Knight

Member of Parliament for Perth Burghs
- In office January 1831 – March 1831
- Preceded by: John Stuart-Wortley-Mackenzie
- Succeeded by: William Ogilvy

Lord Advocate
- In office 1830–1834
- Preceded by: Sir William Rae, 3rd Baronet
- Succeeded by: John Murray

Personal details
- Born: Francis Jeffery; October 23, 1773 Edinburgh, Scotland
- Died: January 26, 1850 (aged 76) Edinburgh, Scotland
- Resting place: Dean Cemetery
- Education: University of Glasgow; University of Edinburgh; Queen’s College, Oxford

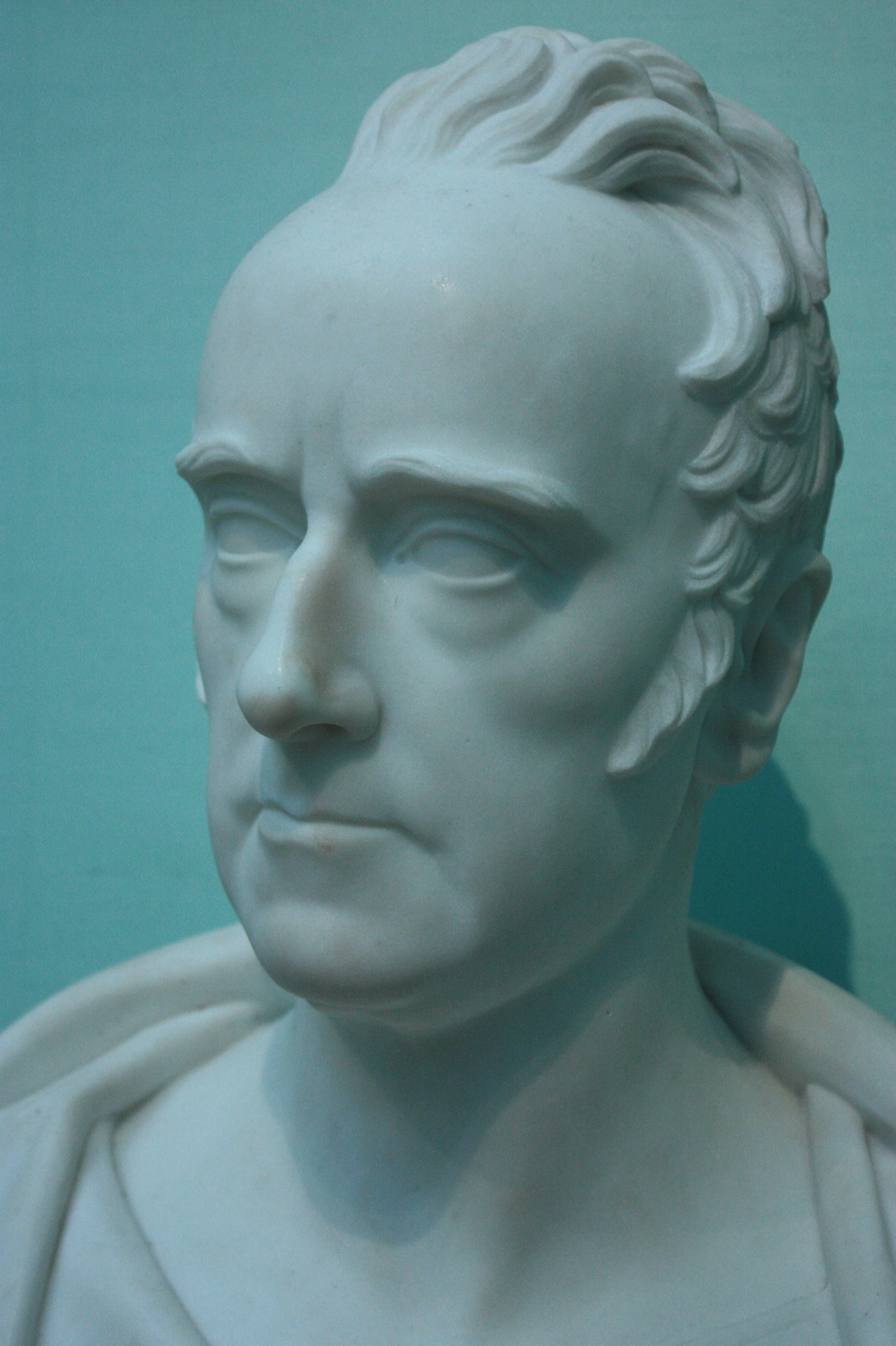
Francis Jeffrey by Patric Park, 1840, National Gallery, London

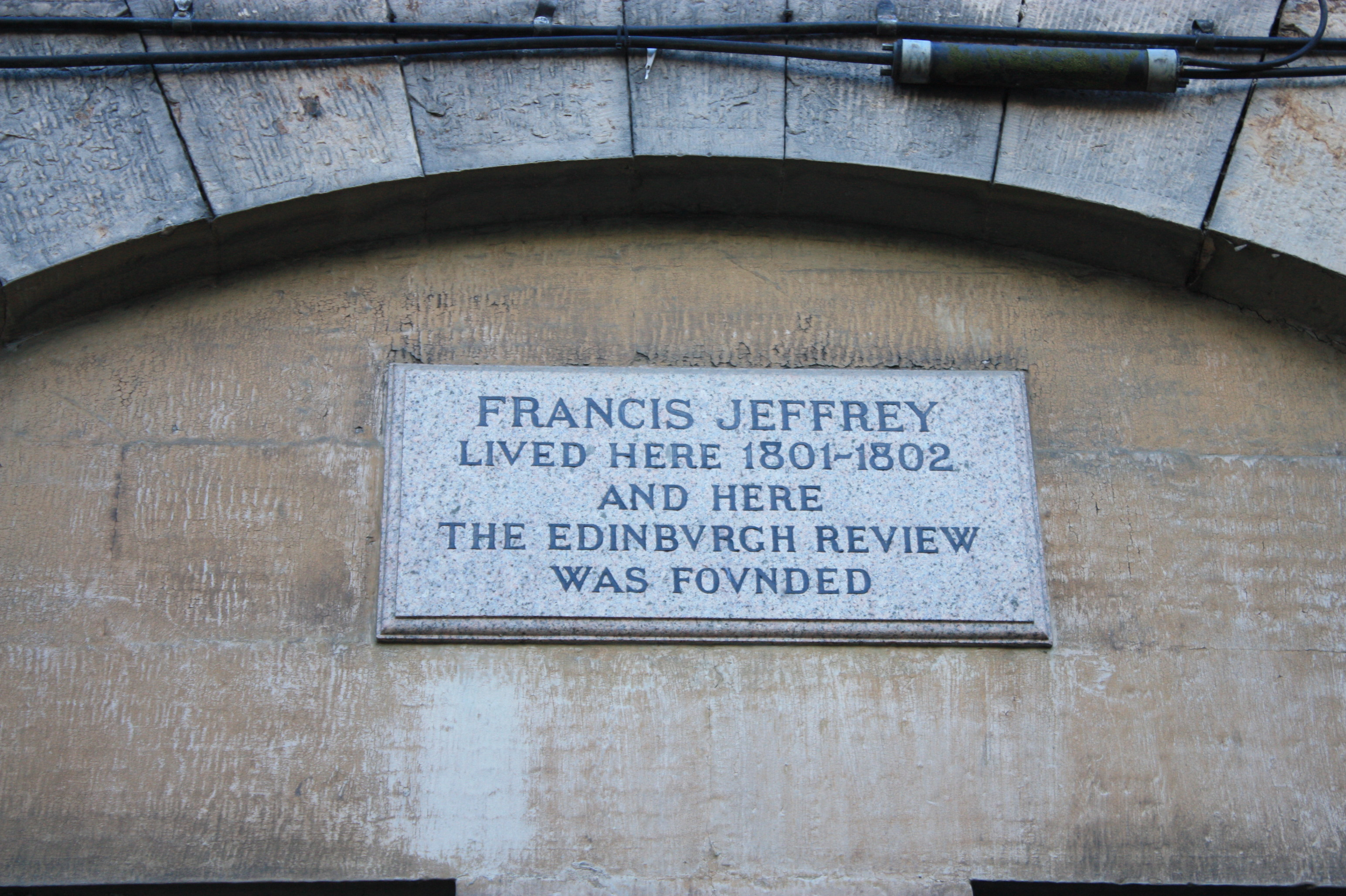
Plaque to Francis Jeffrey, 18 Buccleuch Place, Edinburgh

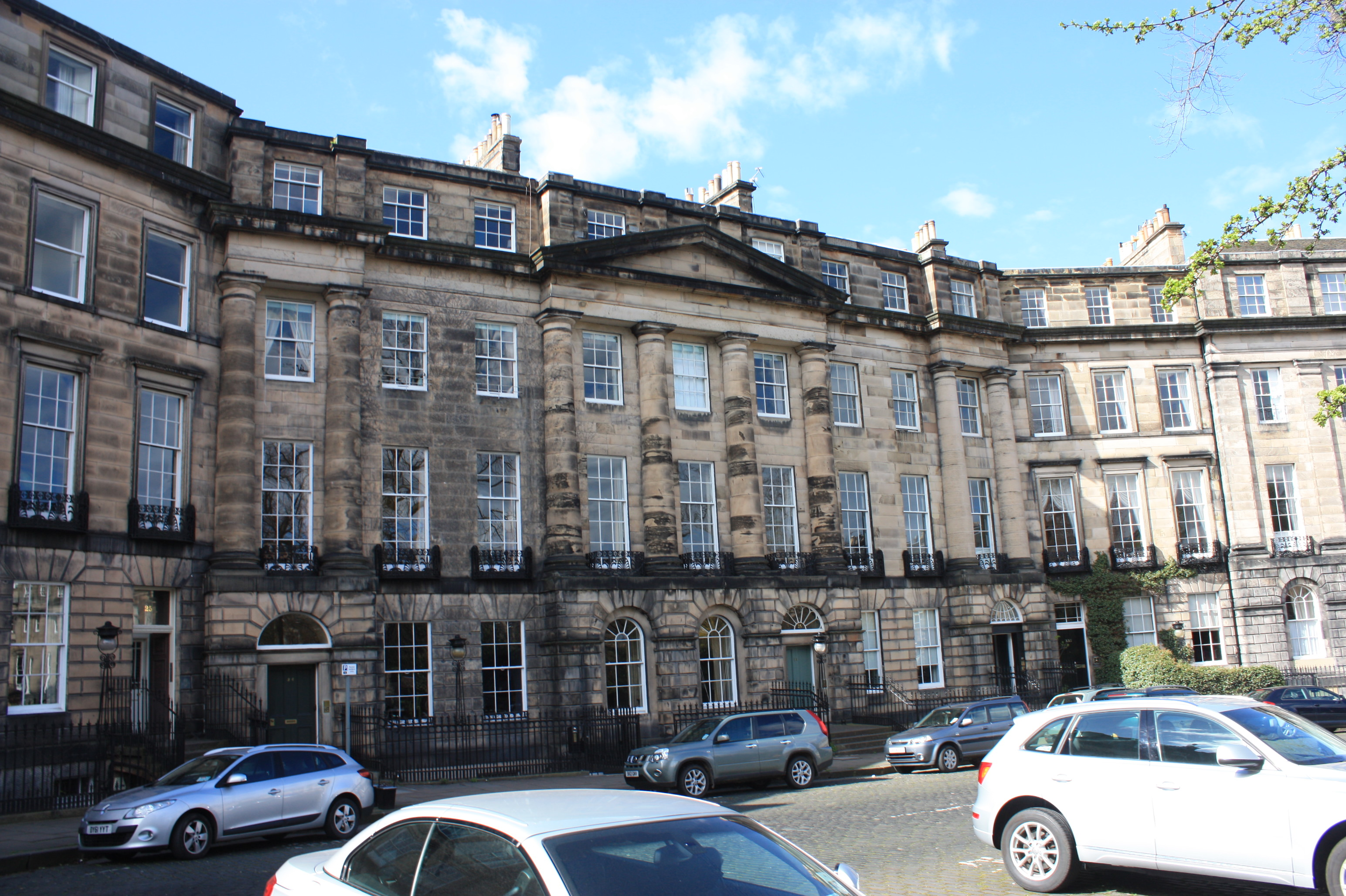
22 to 24 Moray Place Edinburgh. 24, to the left, was the home of Lord Jeffrey

Francis Jeffrey, Lord Jeffrey (23 October 1773 – 26 January 1850) was a Scottish judge and literary critic.

== Life ==
He was born at 7 Charles Street near Potterow in south Edinburgh, the son of George Jeffrey, a clerk in the Court of Session (first clerk to Robert Sinclair, advocate).

After attending the Royal High School for six years, he studied at the University of Glasgow from 1787 to May 1789, and at Queen's College, Oxford, from September 1791 to June 1792. He had begun the study of law at Edinburgh before going to Oxford, and returned to it afterwards. He became a member of the Speculative Society, where he measured himself in debate with Sir Walter Scott, Lord Brougham, Francis Horner, the Marquess of Lansdowne, Lord Kinnaird and others. He was admitted to the Scottish bar in December 1794, but, having abandoned the Tory principles in which he had been educated, he found that his Whig politics hampered his legal prospects.

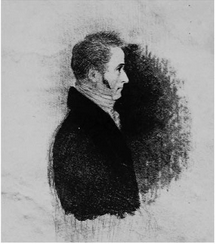
Francis Jeffrey, Lord Jeffrey by Robert Scott Moncrieff.

After his lack of success at the bar he went to London in 1798 to try his hand at journalism, but without success; he also failed in his attempts to obtain a salaried position. His marriage to Catherine Wilson in 1801 made the question of a settled income even more pressing. A project for a new review, brought up by Sydney Smith in Jeffrey's flat (on Buccleuch Place) in the presence of Henry Brougham (afterwards Lord Brougham), Francis Horner and others, resulted in the appearance on 10 October 1802 of the Edinburgh Review.

At the outset the Review did not have an editor. The first three numbers were effectively edited by Sydney Smith. When he left for England the work devolved chiefly on Jeffrey, who, by an arrangement with Archibald Constable, the publisher, was eventually appointed editor at a fixed salary. Most of those involved were Whigs; but, although the general bias of the Review was towards social and political reforms, it was at first so little of a party organ that it numbered Sir Walter Scott among its contributors; and no distinct emphasis was given to its political leanings until the publication in 1808 of an article by Jeffrey himself on the work of Don Pedro Cevallos on the French Usurpation of Spain. This article expressed despair of the success of the British arms in Spain, and Scott at once withdrew his subscription, the Quarterly was soon afterwards started in opposition. According to Lord Cockburn the effect of the first number of the Edinburgh Review was "electrical." The English reviews were at that time practically publishers' organs, with articles by hack writers instructed to obey the publishers' interests. The Edinburgh Review, on the other hand, enlisted a brilliant and independent staff of contributors, guided by the editor, not the publisher. They received sixteen guineas a sheet (sixteen printed pages), increased subsequently to twenty-five guineas in many cases, instead of the two guineas earned by London reviewers. The review was not limited to literary criticism and became the accredited organ of moderate Whig public opinion. The particular work which was the basis of an article was in many cases merely the occasion for the exposition of the author's views on politics, social subjects, ethics or literature. These general principles and the novelty of the method ensured the success of the undertaking even after the original circle of exceptionally able men who founded it had been dispersed. It had a circulation of 12,000. Jeffrey's editorship lasted about twenty-six years, ceasing with the ninety-eighth number, published in June 1829, when he resigned in favour of Macvey Napier.

Jeffrey's own contributions numbered two hundred, all except six written before his resignation. He wrote quickly, at odd moments of leisure and with little special preparation. Great fluency and ease of diction, considerable warmth of imagination and moral sentiment, and a sharp eye for any oddity of style or violation of the accepted canons of good taste, made his criticisms pungent and effective. But the essential narrowness and timidity of his general outlook prevented him from detecting and estimating latent forces, either in politics or in matters strictly intellectual and moral; and this lack of understanding and sympathy accounts for his distrust and dislike of the passion and fancy of Shelley and Keats, and for his praise of the half-hearted and elegant romanticism of Samuel Rogers and Thomas Campbell.

A criticism in the sixteenth number of the Review on the morality of Thomas Moore's poems led in 1806 to a duel between the two authors at Chalk Farm. The proceedings were stopped by the police, and Jeffrey's pistol was found to contain no bullet. The affair led to a warm friendship, and Moore contributed to the Review, while Jeffrey made ample amends in a later article on Lalla Rookh (1817).

Jeffrey's wife died in 1805, and in 1810 he became acquainted with Charlotte, daughter of Charles Wilkes of New York, and great-niece of John Wilkes. When she returned to the United States, Jeffrey followed her, and they were married in 1813. Before returning to Scotland, they visited several of the chief American cities, and his experience strengthened Jeffrey in the conciliatory policy he had advocated towards the States.

Notwithstanding the increasing success of the Review, Jeffrey continued to look to the bar as the chief field of his ambition. His literary reputation helped his professional advancement. His practice extended rapidly in the civil and criminal courts, and he regularly appeared before the general assembly of the Church of Scotland. As an advocate his sharpness and rapidity of insight gave him a formidable advantage in detecting the weaknesses of a witness and the vulnerable points of his opponent's case, while he grouped his own arguments with an admirable eye to effect, especially excelling in eloquent closing appeals to a jury. Jeffrey was twice, in 1820 and 1822, elected Rector of the University of Glasgow. In 1829 he was chosen dean of the Faculty of Advocates. On the return of the Whigs to power in 1830 he became Lord Advocate, and entered parliament at a by-election in January 1831 as member for the Perth burghs. The election was overturned on petition, and in March he was returned at a by-election for Malton, a borough in the interest of Lord Fitzwilliam. He was re-elected in Malton at the general election in May 1831, but was also returned for the Perth burghs and chose to sit for the latter. After the passing of the Scottish Reform Bill, which he introduced in parliament, he was returned for Edinburgh in December 1832. At this time he was living at 24 Moray Place in the west end of Edinburgh.

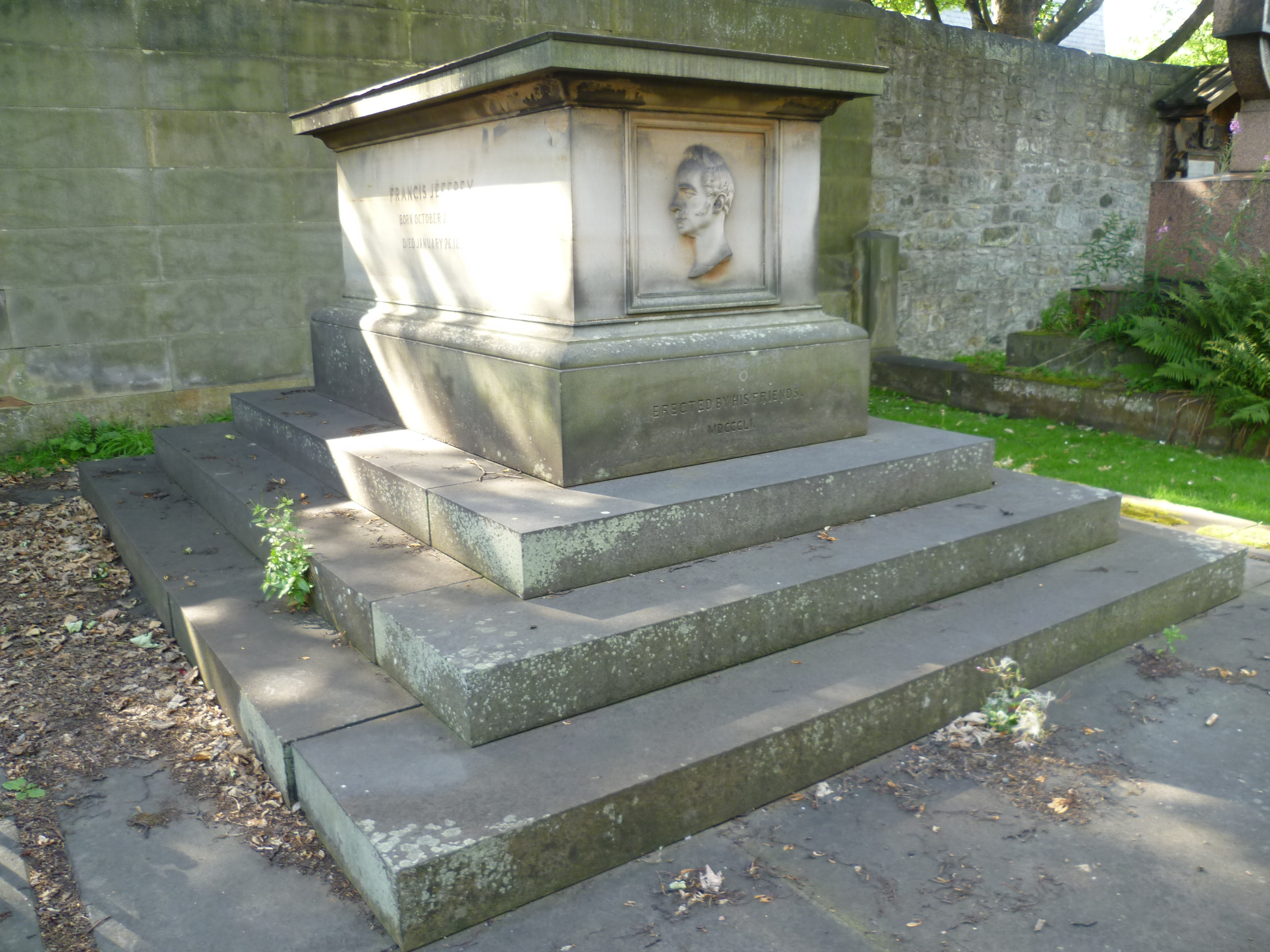
Grave in the Dean Cemetery, Edinburgh

His parliamentary career, which, though not brilliantly successful, had won him high general esteem, was terminated by his elevation to the judicial bench as Lord Jeffrey in May 1834. In 1842 he was moved to the first division of the Court of Session. On the disruption of the Scottish Church he took the side of the seceders, giving a judicial opinion in their favour, afterwards reversed by the House of Lords.

He died at Edinburgh and was buried in the "Lords Row" near the western wall in Dean Cemetery on the west side of the city.

Some of his contributions to the Edinburgh Review appeared in four volumes in 1844 and 1845. This selection includes the essay on "Beauty" contributed to the Encyclopædia Britannica. The Life of Lord Jeffrey, with a Selection from his Correspondence, by Lord Cockburn, appeared in 1852 in 2 vols. See also the Selected Correspondence of Macvey Napier (1877); the sketch of Jeffrey in Carlyle's Reminiscences, vol. ii. (1881); and an essay by Lewis E Gates in Three Studies in Literature (New York, 1899).

== Memorials ==
Jeffrey Street (a planned street of 1868) in Edinburgh is named in his memory.

A bust by Sir John Steell stands on the east wall of Parliament Hall, behind St Giles Cathedral in Edinburgh.

== In Fiction ==
The character Beau Nardi in John Paterson's Mare, James Hogg's allegorical satire on the Edinburgh publishing scene first published in the Newcastle Magazine in 1825, was based on Francis Jeffrey.

== Family ==
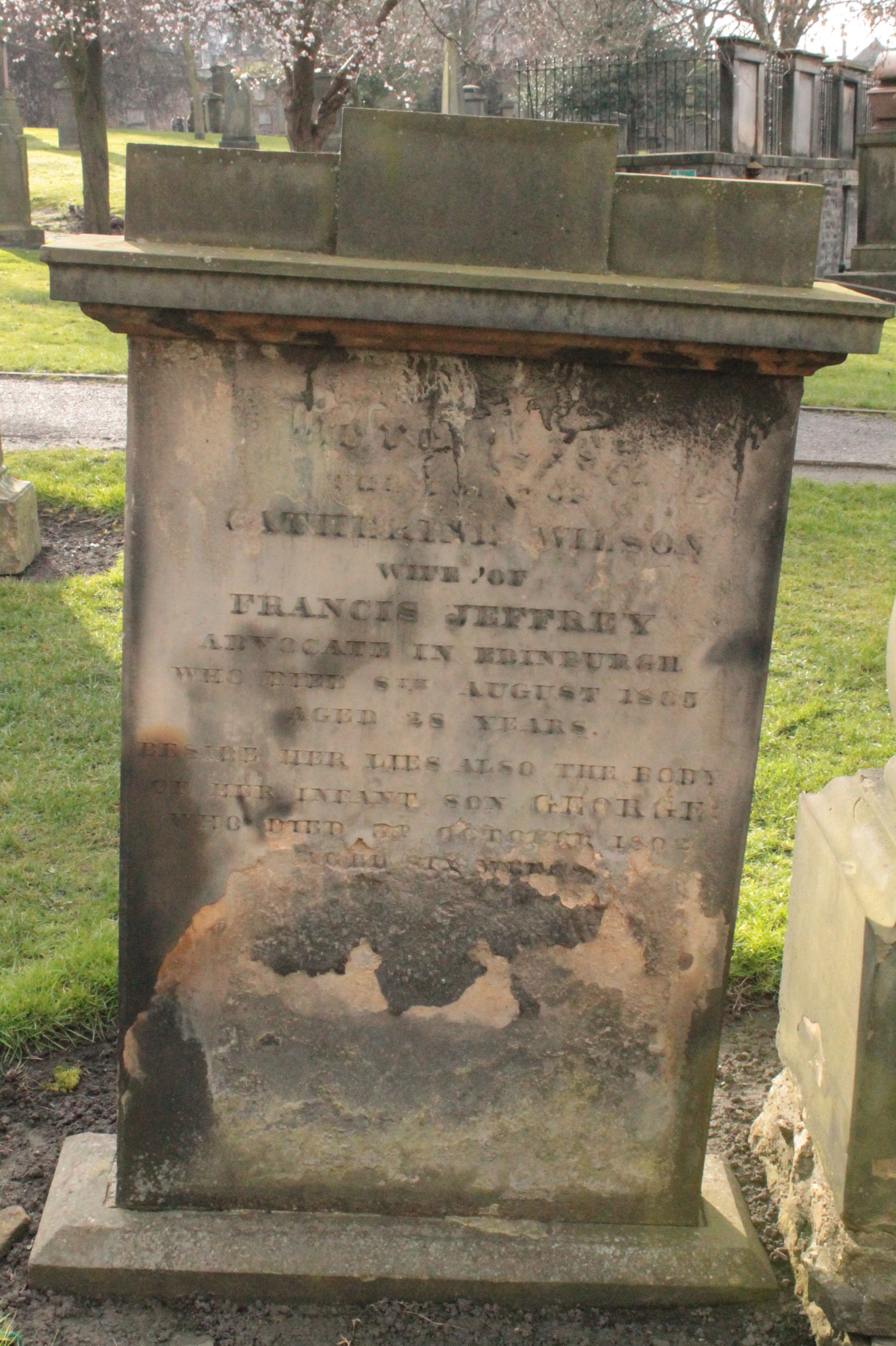
The grave of Catherine Wilson (wife of Francis Jeffrey) Greyfriars Kirkyard

Francis Jeffrey's first wife, Catherine Wilson, died 8 August 1805, aged only 28, and is buried in Greyfriars Kirkyard, with their infant child George (d.1802). His brother, John Jeffrey (1775-1848) is also buried there.

His sister, Marian, married Dr Thomas Brown of Lanfine and Waterhaughs FRSE in 1800.

Parliament of the United Kingdom
Preceded by John Stuart-Wortley-Mackenzie	Member of Parliament for Perth Burghs; Jan 1831– March 1831	Succeeded by William Ogilvy
Preceded by Sir James Scarlett; John Charles Ramsden	Member of Parliament for Malton; April 1831 – July 1831; With: John Charles Ramsden to May 1831; Henry Gally Knight from May 1831	Succeeded by Lord Cavendish; Henry Gally Knight
Preceded by William Ogilvy	Member of Parliament for Perth Burghs; 1831–1832	constituency abolished
Preceded by Robert Adam Dundas	Member of Parliament for Edinburgh; 1832–1834; With: James Abercromby	Succeeded by James Abercromby and Sir John Campbell
Academic offices
Preceded by Kirkman Finlay	Rector of the University of Glasgow; 1820–1822	Succeeded by James Mackintosh
