= Royal Medical Society =

Student society in Edinburgh

Coordinates: 55°56′42″N 3°11′22″W

- Abbreviation: RMS
- Formation: 1737, Royal Charter 1778
- Purpose: Medical student society, educational and social
- Location: University of Edinburgh
- Website: www.royalmedical.co.uk

The Royal Medical Society (RMS) is a society run by students at the University of Edinburgh Medical School, Scotland. It claims to be the oldest medical society in the United Kingdom although this claim is also made by the earlier London-based Society of Apothecaries (1617). The current president of the 287th session is fifth-year medical student Miss Nanna Sivamanoharan. The RMS is a professional society engaged in the advancement of medical knowledge and provision of assistance to medical students and professionals.

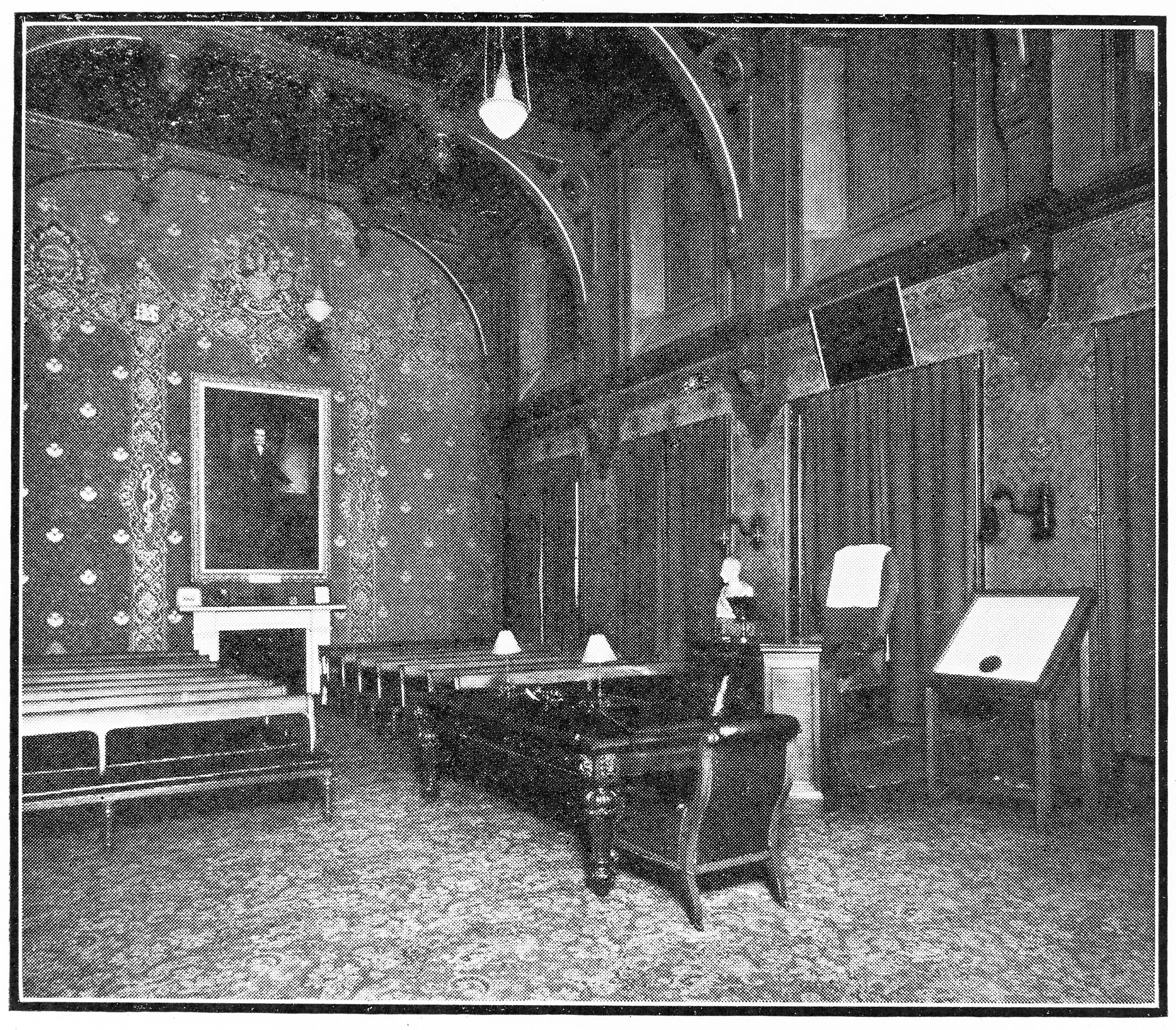

== History ==
In 1737 it was established as 'the Medical Society' in 1737. It was granted a Royal Charter in 1778. Earlier the society was conceived in 1734 by a group of students who dissected the same body in the anatomy dissection room. They included Dr Cleghorn, Dr Cuming, Dr Russell, Dr Hamilton, Mr Archibald Taylor and Dr James Kennedy and perhaps Dr Fothergill. The source is a letter to Dr Fothergill from Dr Cuming in 1782.

The RMS sold its extensive library, built up throughout the 18th and 19th centuries, at three sales at Sotheby's in London in 1969. Much of the collection was purchased by the University of Wisconsin–Madison.

== Journal ==
Res Medica is the journal of the Royal Medical Society. It was first published in 1957 which means that it one of the longest-running student-led publications in Britain.

== The society today ==
The RMS owns rooms above Potterrow, the Edinburgh Students Union building, on Bristo Square. During the Edinburgh Festival Fringe, the rooms are used as a performance venue for Pleasance promoters and host the Performers'/VIP bar (Brooke's Bar). The estate, is managed by the RMS Trust, which has charitable status.

The day-to-day running of the society is managed by the RMS Council – consisting of a senior president, three junior presidents and 11 conveners, each concerned with particular areas of the society.

== Notable members ==
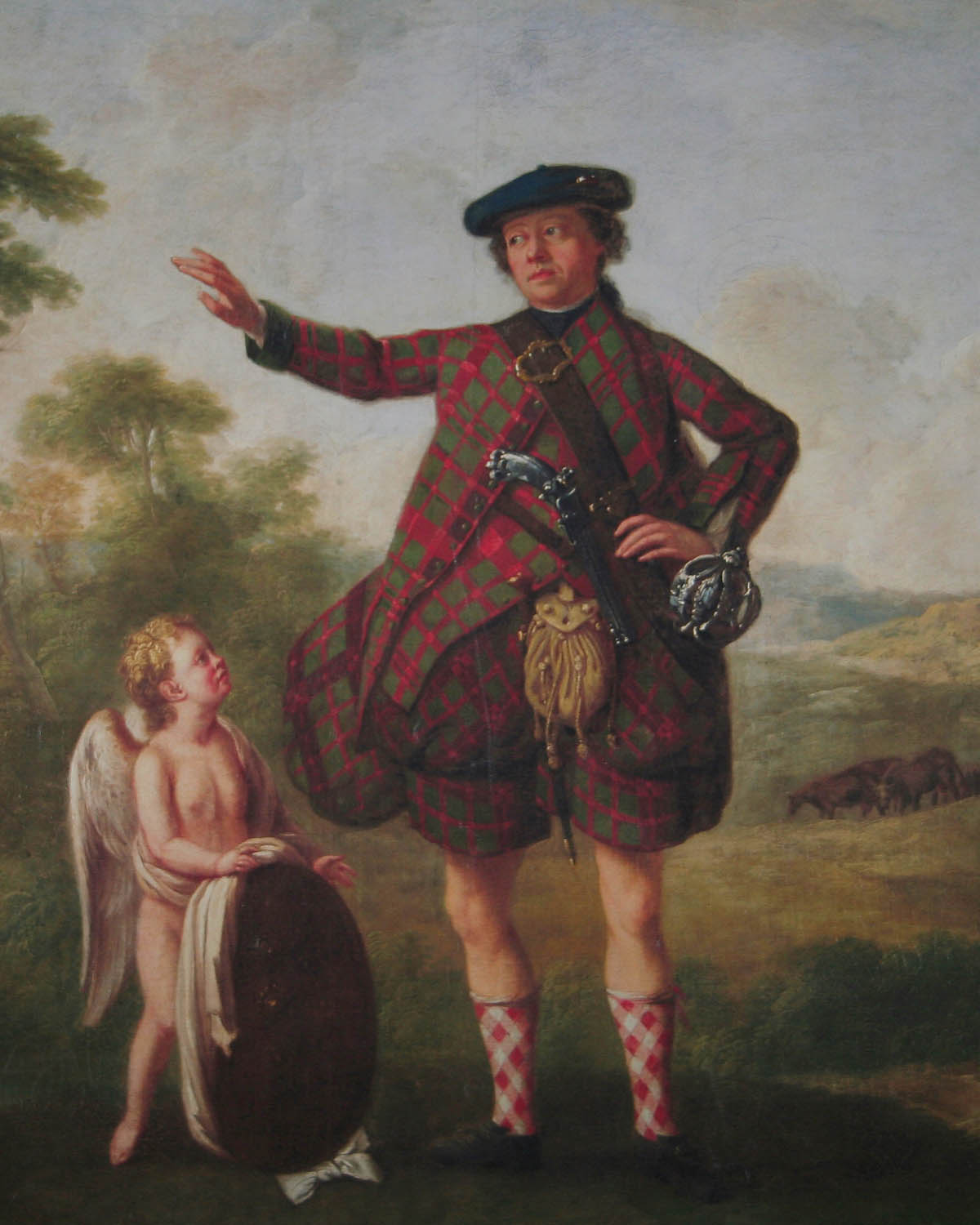
Detail of painting of Dr Sir Stuart Threipland, of Fingask (1716–1805); Bonnie Prince Charlie's physician during the Rising, and President of the Royal Medical Society (1766–1770).

- Thomas Harrison Burder
- William A.F. Browne, asylum reformer
- Robert Cleghorn, Hon President 1781, Senior President 1783
- Andrew Combe
- James Crichton-Browne, psychiatrist
- William Cullen, one of the founders of the society
- Charles Darwin
- Andrew Duncan, the elder, physician and six-time president
- William Collins Engledue, phrenologist
- Benjamin Franklin
- Marshall Hall, elected senior president in 1811
- Francis Home, first professor of material medica; elected 1740
- Matthew Kaufman
- Joseph Lister
- Drummond Shiels, a fellow and senior president
- Sir John Struthers, physician, anatomist
- Stuart Threipland, (see also Fingask Castle), physician to Charles Edward Stuart (Bonnie Prince Charlie), president 1766–1770
- Jozef Venglos
- Hewett Watson, evolutionary theorist and friend of Charles Darwin, elected senior president in 1831
- German Sims Woodhead, a former president

== See also ==
- Royal College of Physicians of Edinburgh
- Royal College of Surgeons of Edinburgh
- Surgeon's Hall
- University of Edinburgh Medical School
