= Dundee (Parliament of Scotland constituency) =

Constituency of the Old Parliament of Scotland

Dundee in Forfarshire was a royal burgh that returned one commissioner to the Parliament of Scotland and to the Convention of Estates.

After the Acts of Union 1707, Dundee, Cupar, Forfar, Perth and St Andrews formed the Perth district of burghs (sometimes called Forfar Burghs), returning one member between them to the House of Commons of Great Britain.

== List of burgh commissioners ==
- 1643 (convention): Thomas Mudie
- 1643 (convention): Robert Davidson
- 1643 (convention): George Brown
- 1644: Thomas Haliburton
- 1645: James Sympson
- 1645–47, 1648–51, 1661–63: Alexander Wedderburn of Kingany, provost
- 1649, 1651: Robert Davidson
- 1650-51: Alexander Bower
- 1665 (convention): George Fletcher, dean of guild
- 1667 (convention): John Kinloch, merchant, bailie
- 1669–1674: George Forrester, merchant-burgess, councillor
- 1678 (convention): Alexander Wedderburn, provost
- 1681–82, 1702, 1702–07: John Scrymgeour of Kirktoun, provost
- 1685–86, 1689 (convention), 1689–1701: James Fletcher, provost (died c.1701)

== See also ==
- List of constituencies in the Parliament of Scotland at the time of the Union
