= Perth (Parliament of Scotland constituency) =

Constituency of the Old Parliament of Scotland

Perth was a royal burgh that returned one commissioner to the Parliament of Scotland and to the Convention of Estates.

After the Acts of Union 1707, Perth, Cupar, Dundee, Forfar and St Andrews formed the Perth district of burghs, returning one member between them to the House of Commons of Great Britain.

== List of burgh commissioners ==
- 1661–63: John Paterson of Benchillis
- 1665 convention, 1667 convention, 1669–74: Patrick Threipland of Fingask, merchant, provost
- 1678 convention: Patrick Hay, merchant, provost
- 1681–82, 1685–86: John Glass, provost
- 1689 convention, 1689–1701: Robert Smith, former baillie
- 1702–07: Alexander Robertson of Craig

== See also ==
- List of constituencies in the Parliament of Scotland at the time of the Union
