= Forfar (Parliament of Scotland constituency) =

Constituency of the Old Parliament of Scotland

Forfar was a royal burgh that returned one commissioner to the Parliament of Scotland and to the Convention of Estates.

After the Acts of Union 1707, Forfar, Cupar, Dundee, Perth and St Andrews formed the Perth district of burghs (sometimes called Forfar Burghs), returning one member between them to the House of Commons of Great Britain.

== List of burgh commissioners ==
- 1661: David Dickinson, bailie
- 1665 convention, 1667 convention: not represented
- 1669–74: James Carnegie
- 1678 convention, 1681–82, 1685–86, 1689 convention, 1689–95: John Carnegie, bailie and provost (died c.1695)
- 1698–1701, 1702–07: John Lyon, sheriff clerk

== See also ==
- List of constituencies in the Parliament of Scotland at the time of the Union
