= Royal College of Physicians of Edinburgh =

Medical organization and college in Scotland

- Abbreviation: RCPE
- Established: 1681; 345 years ago
- Type: Medical royal colleges
- Location: Edinburgh
- Coordinates: 55.9550°N 3.1965°W
- Members: 14,000 (2023)
- President: Professor Mark Strachan
- Affiliations: Academy of Medical Royal Colleges; MRCP (UK)
- Website: www.rcpe.ac.uk

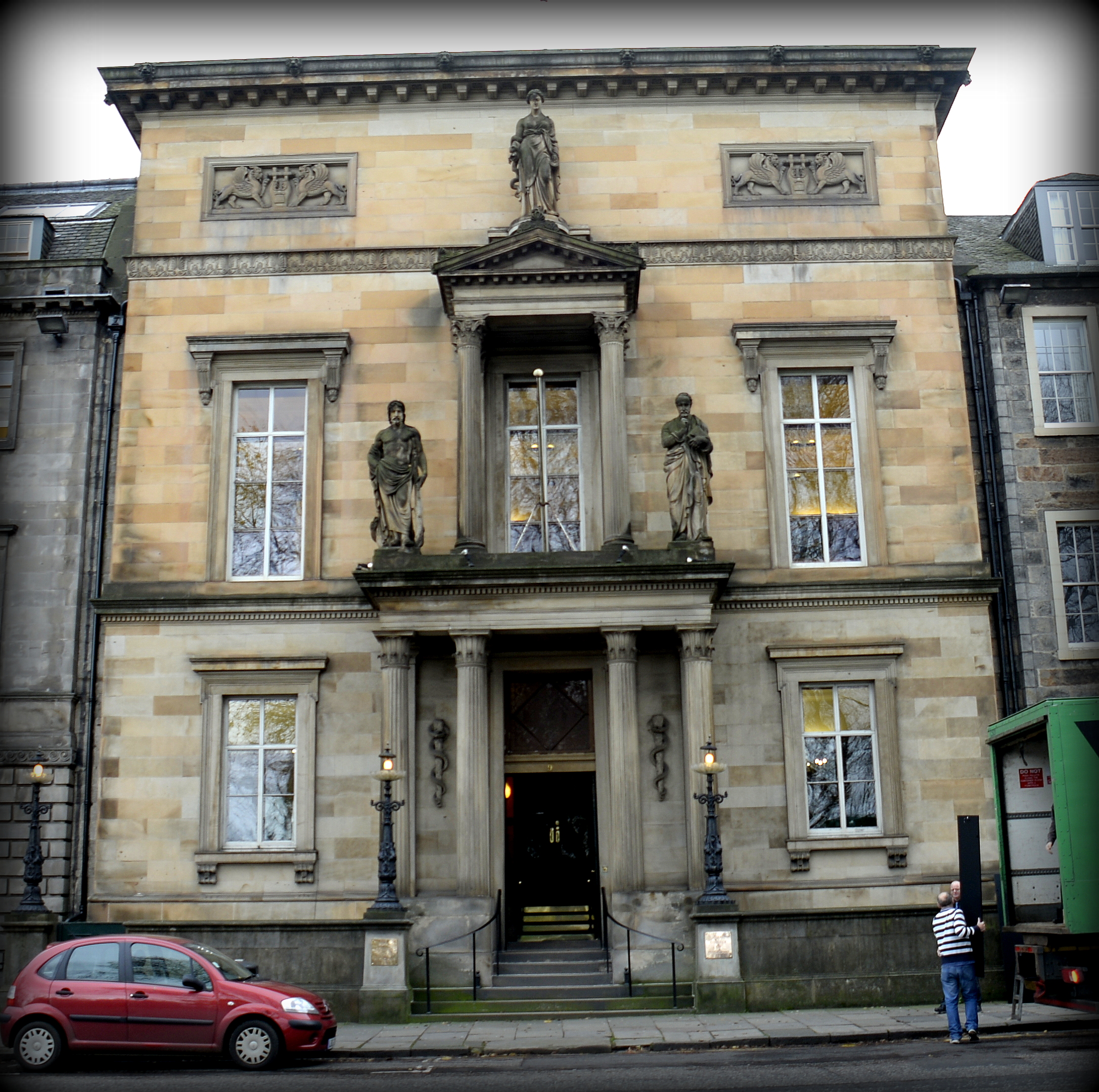
The façade of the Royal College of Physicians of Edinburgh, 9 Queen Street, Edinburgh, Scotland.

The Royal College of Physicians of Edinburgh (RCPE) is a medical royal college in Scotland. It is one of three organisations that set the specialty training standards for physicians in the United Kingdom. It was established by royal charter in 1681. The college has more than 14,000 fellows and members worldwide, who are entitled to use the post-nominal MRCP (Edin) or FRCP (Edin).

== History ==
The RCPE was formed by a royal charter, granted in 1681, with Sir Robert Sibbald recognised as playing a key part in the negotiations. Three applications preceded this and had been unsuccessful. There were 21 original Fellows, eleven of whom were graduates or students of the University of Leiden. The Universities (Scotland) Act 1858 resulted in several items from the college's charter becoming obsolete, and they obtained a further charter on 31 October 1861. In 1920 the college enacted changes that allowed women to be admitted on the same terms as men. The charter was further amended on 7 May 2005.

== Edinburgh Pharmacopoeia ==
In 1699 the college first published a medical guide with standardised recipes Pharmacopoea Colegi Regii Medicorum Edimburgensium; thirteen editions of this Edinburgh Pharmacopoeia were published until 1841 when it was replaced by a British Pharmacopoeia.

== Buildings ==
In 1704 the college acquired a house and grounds on Fountain Close, off the Cowgate, in the Old Town.

On 27 November 1775, William Cullen laid the foundation stone for a new hall and library in George Street in the New Town. Architect James Craig had ideas about expansion but the builders of neighbouring properties found favour instead. The hall was not fully completed until 1830. The great cost of the hall's exterior exhausted the college's finances, leaving no money to finish the interior. The college's debt was so great that there was talk of selling the Hall before it was even occupied. The Hall was sold to the Commercial Bank of Scotland in 1841 and was demolished.

Between 1843 and 1846 the college did not own a meeting place, instead renting premises at 119 George Street.

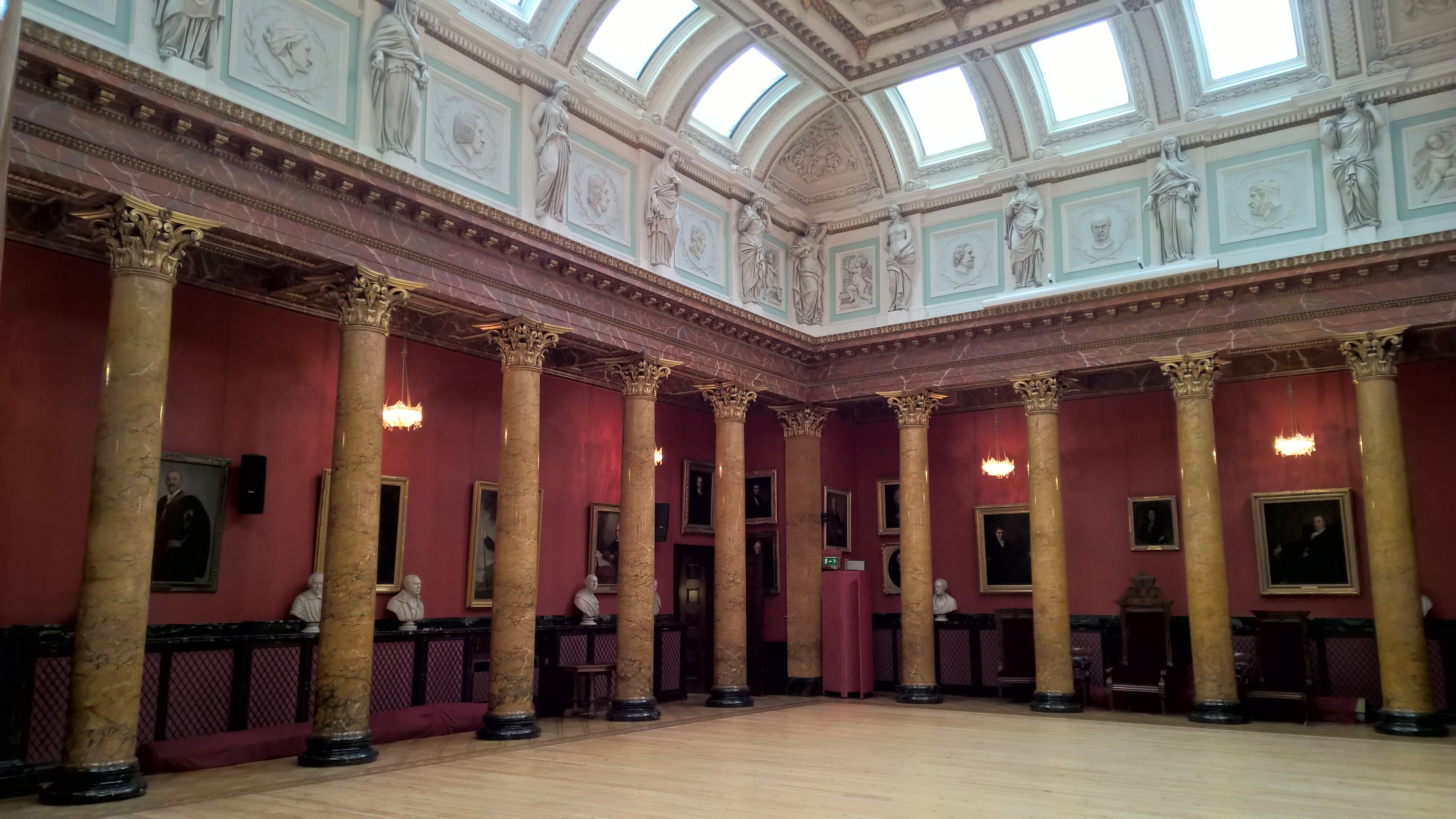
The Great Hall in the RCPE building

The foundation stone of a new Hall at 9 Queen Street was laid on 8 August 1844. The new Queen Street Hall was designed by Thomas Hamilton. The Queen Street Hall was completed in 1846.

An adjacent building, 8 Queen Street, was designed by Robert Adam as a house for Robert Ord and built between 1770 and 1771, one of the earliest New Town constructions. In 1868 it was purchased by the college, who then leased it to other organisations until 1957. A restoration project began in 1990 and lasted seven years.

Numbers 11 and 12 were built around 1780. They were purchased by the college in the 20th century. The space behind 11 was used for the Conference Centre and 12 contains flexible meeting rooms and office space.

In 1984 the college put Richard Dadd's painting of Alexander Morison up for sale, to raise money to treat dry rot.

=== Sibbald Library ===
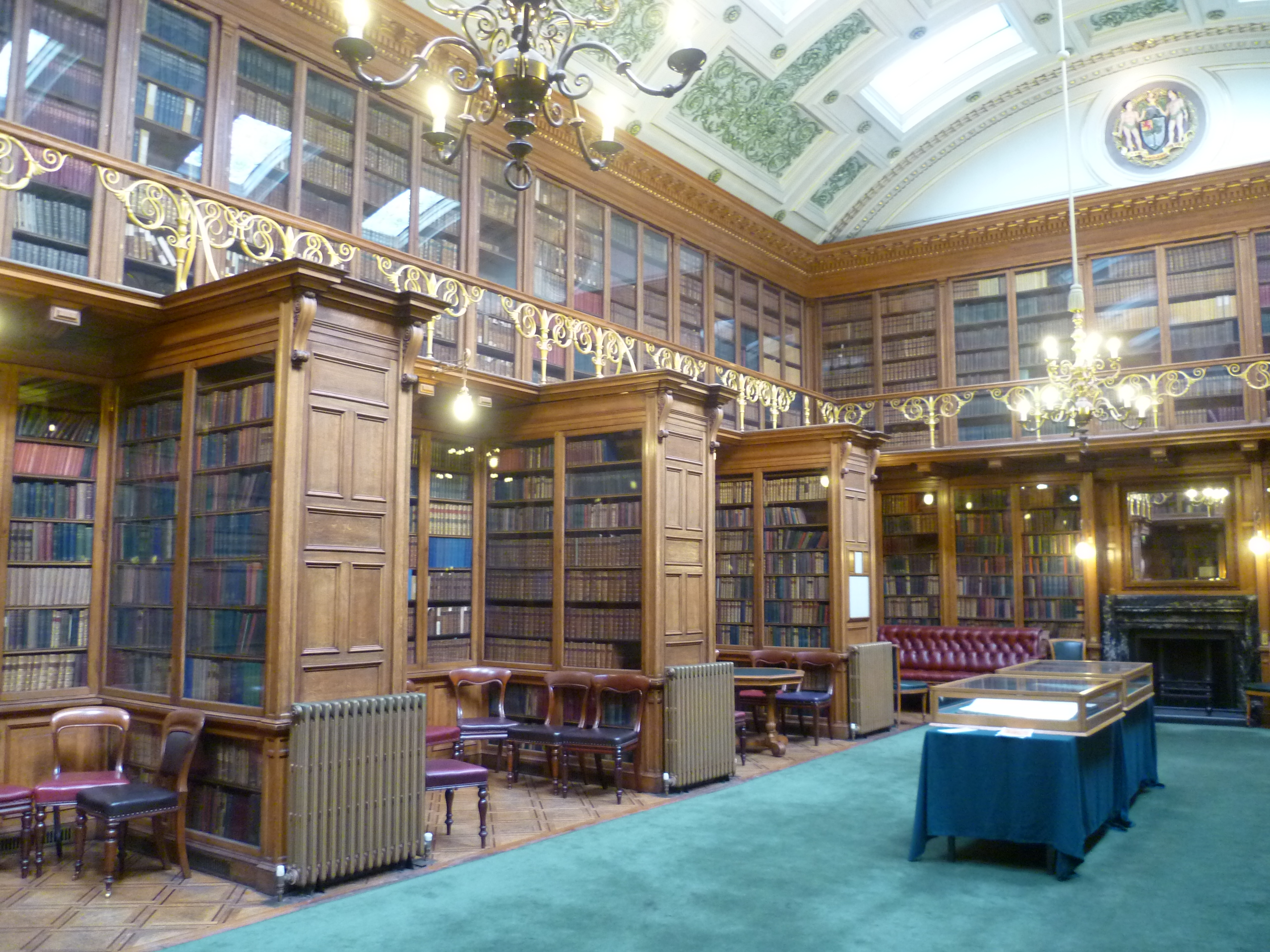
The New Library in the RCPE building

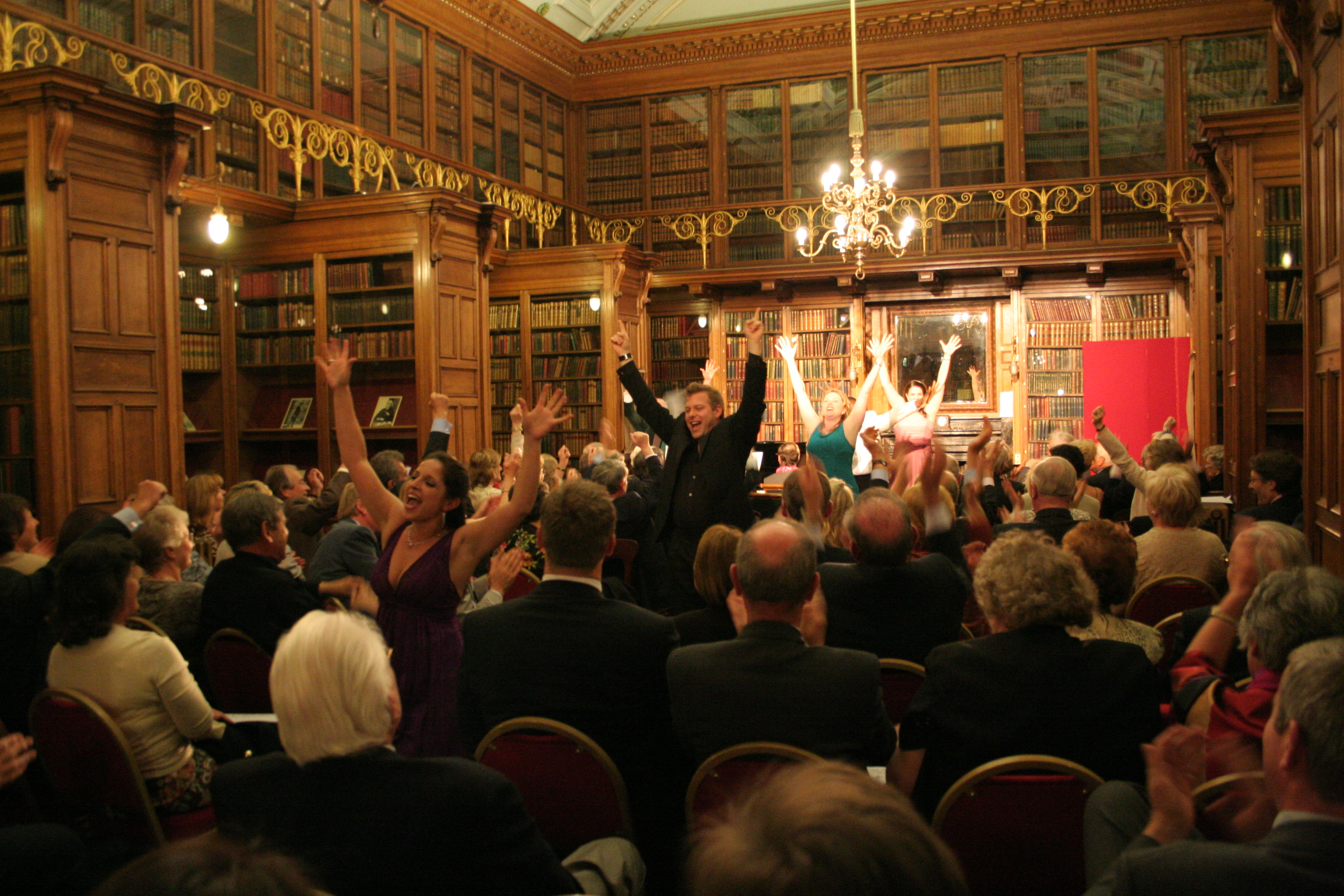
Fingask Follies at The New Library

In 1682, Robert Sibbald donated around one hundred books to the college. At the end of the 18th century, the library was located at the Royal Infirmary. The college's library in Queen Street bears Sibbald's name in commemoration. The library also has artefacts, such as a medicine chest that belonged to Stuart Threipland, physician to Bonnie Prince Charlie. In the 1960s, the information held by the library was modern. From the sixties onward, medical information became more available and college's library became more known for its historical works.

In 2015, a project with the University of Glasgow digitised a collection of 5,000 letters of William Cullen from the mid-1750s to 1790, making them available online.

As of 2016, the college has catalogued more than 30,000 records that are in its archives.

== Laboratory ==
In 1888 the college decided to establish its own research laboratory, and initially rented a house in Lauriston Lane, near the Royal Infirmary. A three-storey building on Forest Road was acquired, and in 1896 was formally opened as the college's new laboratory. It had areas equipped and fitted for a range of disciplines: Bacteriological, Chemical, and Histological and Experimental. With the creation of the NHS, the laboratory could no longer depend upon income from their reporting service, and it closed in 1950.

== Publications ==
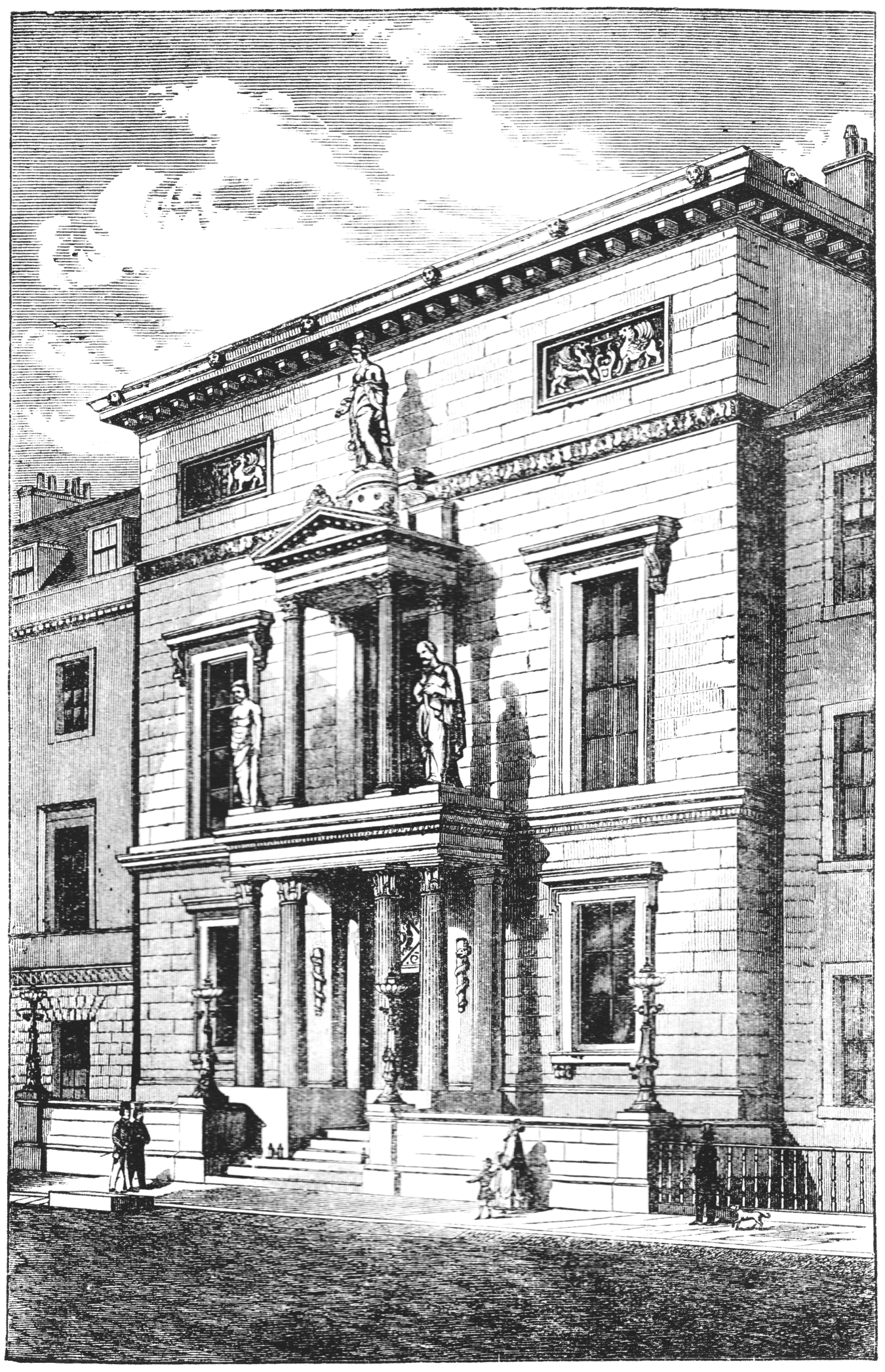
Depiction of the college from Historical Sketches and Laws of the Royal College of Physicians of Edinburgh from its Institution to 1891

The Journal of the Royal College of Physicians of Edinburgh (JRCPE) is a peer-reviewed medical journal published quarterly by the college. It was established in 1971 as Chronicle, renamed in 1988 as Proceedings of the Royal College of Physicians of Edinburgh, and obtained its current title in 2002.

== Membership ==
Following successful completion of the MRCP(UK) or MRCPCH examinations, doctors are eligible to become Members of the college.

== See also ==
- List of presidents of the Royal College of Physicians of Edinburgh
