= Charles Spence (bard) =

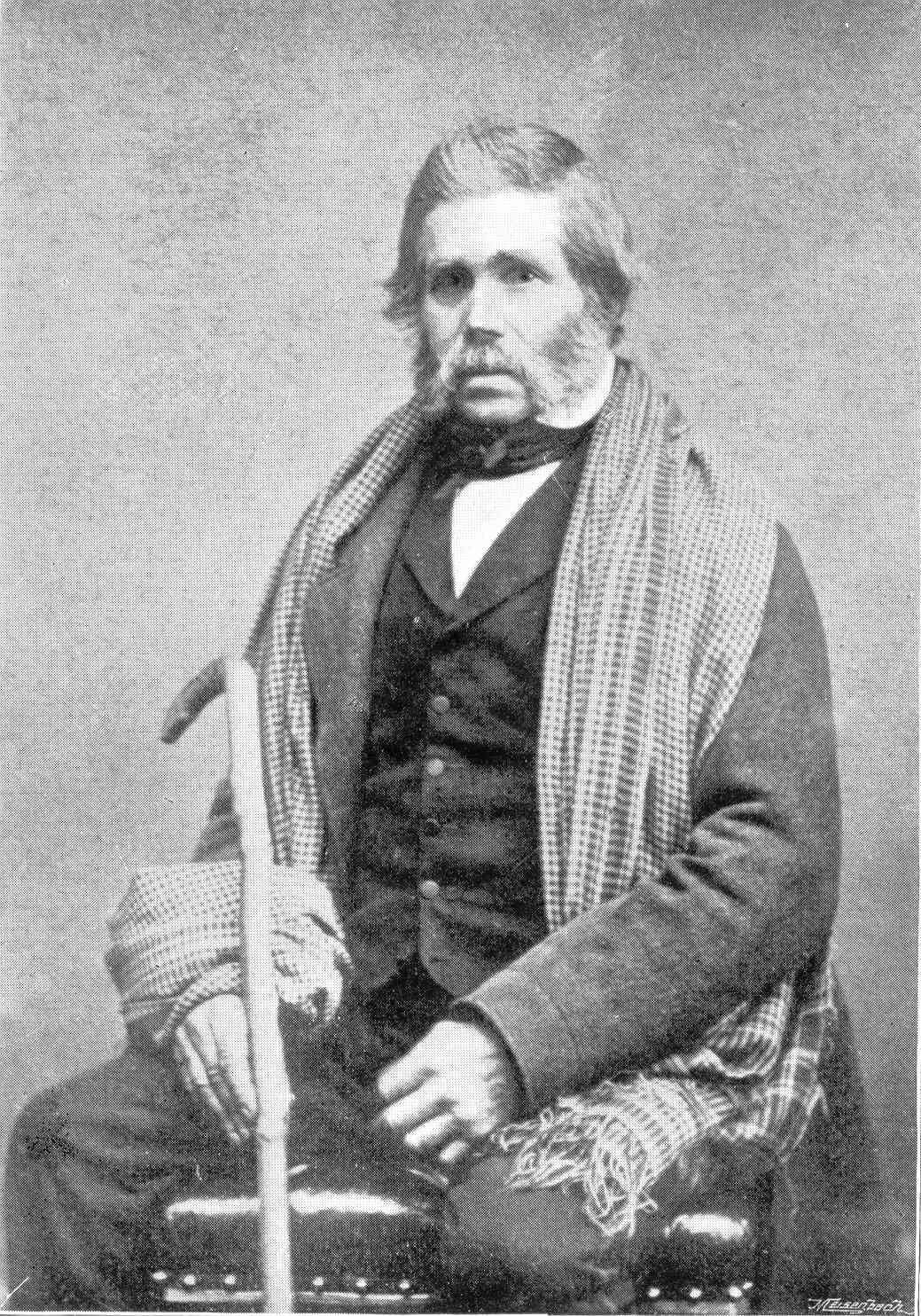
Spence the Burgh Bard

Charles Spence (1779-1869) was a Scottish poet, stonemason and footman.

The Bard of Gowrie; the Poet of the Carse.

Spence was born in the parish of Kinfauns, spent most of his life in Rait and died in Manchester.

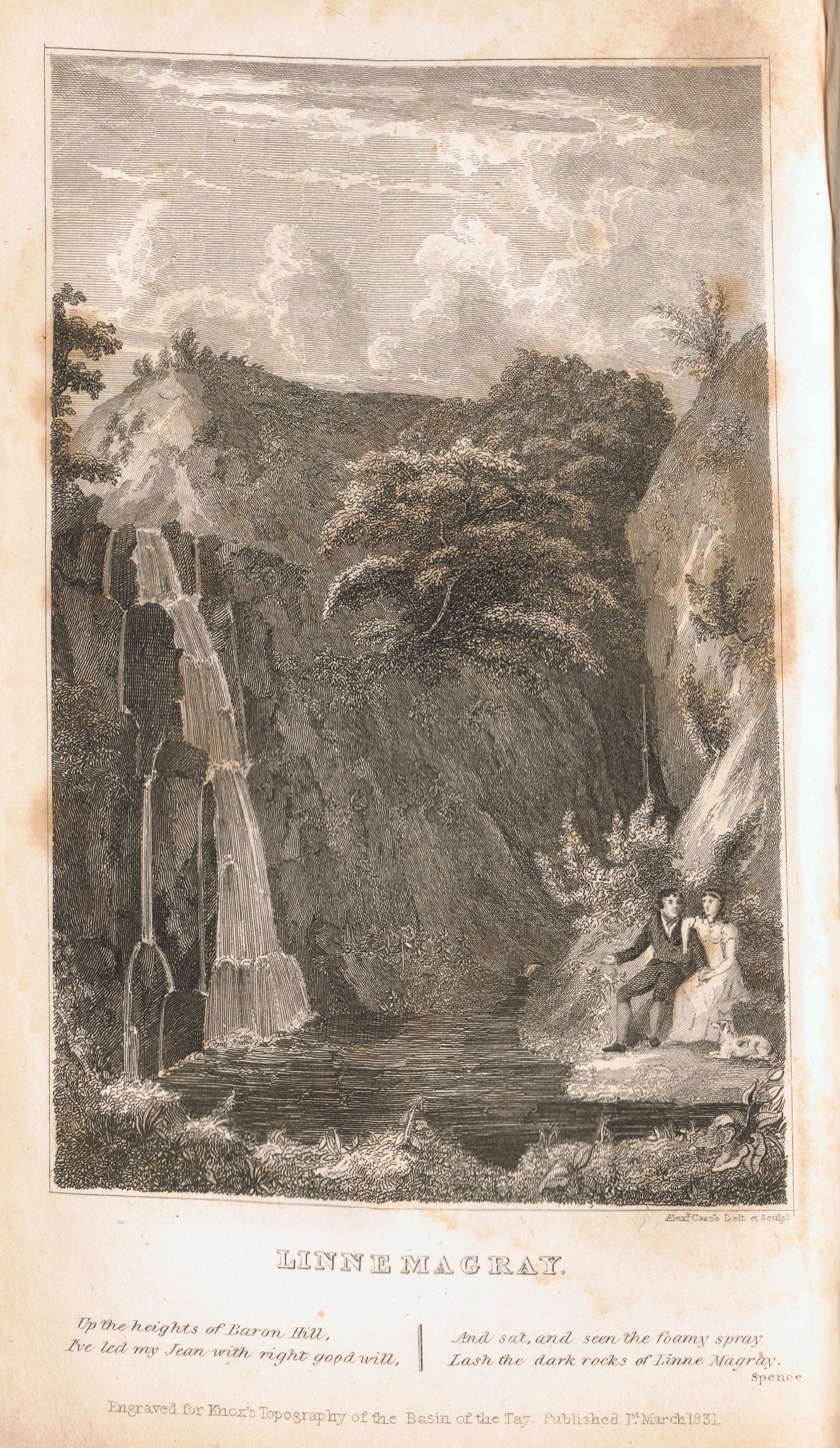
Linne Magray, drawn and engraved by Alexander Carse, published Edinburgh, March 1831.

Linn-ma-Gray I long to see
Thy heathy heights and broomy lea;
Whaur linnets lilt and leverets play
Around the roar of Linn-Ma-Gray.

Linn-ma-Gray when to the street
Crowds follow crowds, in crowds to meet,
I wend my solitary way,
An' climb the cliffs of Linn-ma-Gray.

Linn-ma-Gray, each mounting spring,
From age to age doth tribute bring,
And rushing onwards to the Tay,
Augment the stream of Linn-ma-Gray.

Linn-ma-Gray round Baron hill, [Up the heights of Baron Hill,]
I've aften gane wi' richt gude will, [I've led my Jean with right good will.]
An' sat and seen the dashing spray [And sat, and seen the foamy spray]
Lash the dark rocks of Linn-ma-Gray. [Lash the dark rocks of Linne Magray.]

Linn-ma-Gray, when in yon ha'
The merry wassailers gather a'
In vain their waeel trained bands essay
The minstrelsy of Linn-ma-Gray.

Another favourite Spence poem was entitled: 'My love's window'.

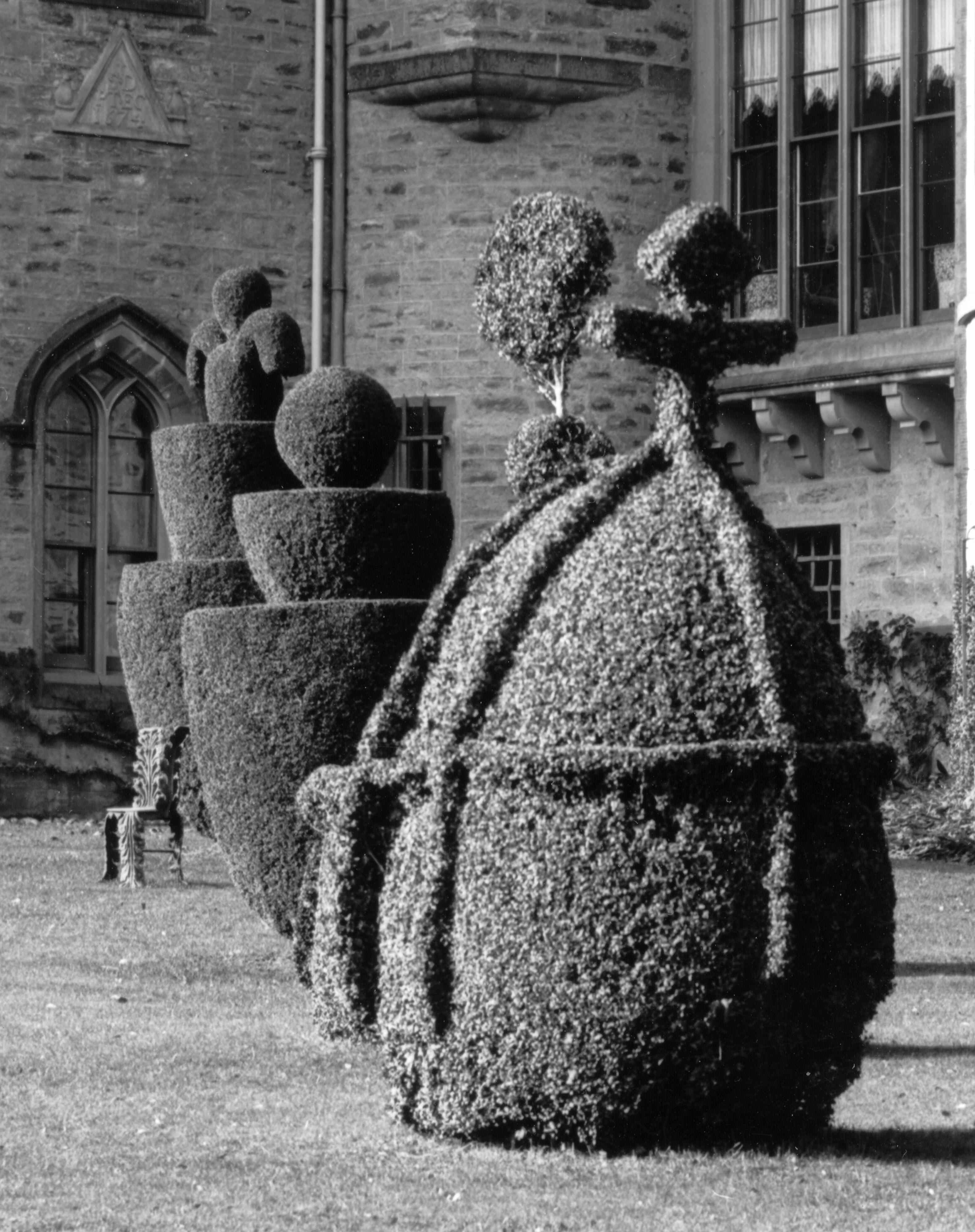
_{View of topiary at Fingask, as known by Spence}

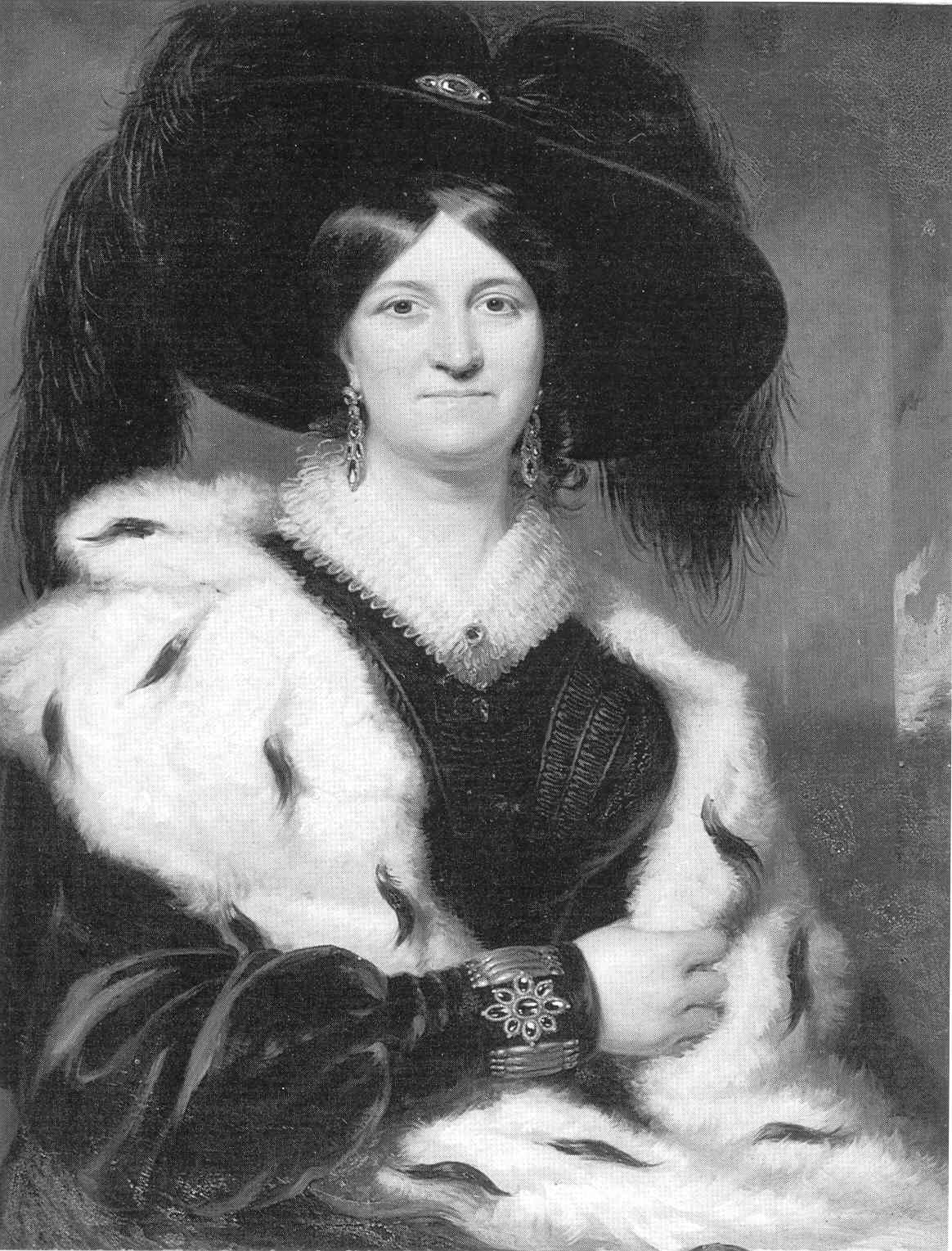
_{Lady Threipland of Fingask Castle, for whose family Spence was both footman and mason}
