= Sir John Stewart, 1st Baronet, of Fingask =

Scottish whisky distiller

Sir John Stewart Bt DL JP FRGS
- Born: John Henderson Stewart; 26 November 1877; Dundee, Scotland
- Died: 6 February 1924 (aged 46); Fingask Castle, Rait, Perthshire, Scotland
- Occupation: Whisky distiller

Sir John Henderson Stewart, 1st Baronet, DL, JP, FRGS (26 November 1877 – 6 February 1924) was a Scottish whisky distiller.

Stewart was the son of Alexander Stewart of Dundee, and became sole partner of Alexander Stewart & Son, whisky distillers, of Dundee: his share amounted to £150,000. He was also sole partner of Fraser, Stewart & Co, whisky merchants, and deputy chairman of Sheffield Steel Products. He was created a baronet in the 1920 Birthday Honours.

He married Ethel Bailey, daughter of John Fraser of Monkbarns, Arbroath, on 22 March 1904. His son Sir Bruce Stewart, 2nd Baronet, was born on 6 September 1904 and became a Flying Officer in the New Zealand Air Force.

A casualty of prohibition, he died owing £570,000, which would be between £30 and £120 million in 2007 money. On 7 February 1924 his body was discovered at Fingask Castle, his Perthshire home, by two businessmen who had come for a meeting with him. He had been shot through the head. He was last seen the previous day by the driver of a taxi which he took to the castle, which was otherwise unoccupied at the time, from Dundee. He was deeply in debt at the time, as his business was not doing well and an Edinburgh company in which he also had large interests, Aitken, Melrose & Co Ltd, had collapsed the previous day. An inquest returned a verdict of suicide. He was 46 years old.

On 1 October 1924, one of Stewart's creditors, John Quiller Rowett, to whom he owed nearly £100,000, hanged himself in his London home.

== Footnotes ==
Baronetage of the United Kingdom
New creation	Baronet (of Fingask); 1920–1924	Succeeded by Bruce Fraser Stewart
