= Fingask Castle =

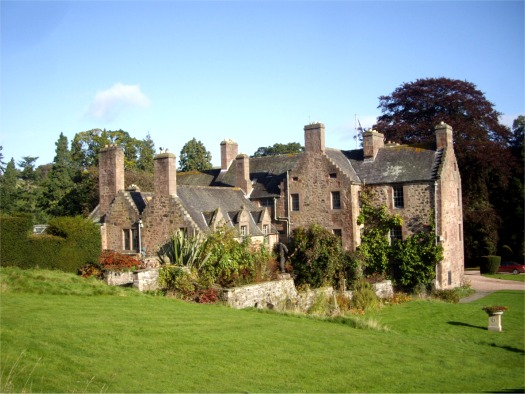
- Fingask Castle in 2008

- Location of Fingask Castle in Perth and Kinross
- 56°25′59″N 3°15′13″W
- Location: Rait, Perthshire, Scotland

Listed Building – Category B

Inventory of Gardens and Designed Landscapes in Scotland
- Official name: Fingask Castle
- Designated: 1 July 1987
- Reference no.: GDL00179

Fingask Castle is a country house in Perth and Kinross, Scotland. It is perched 200 feet (61 m) above Rait, three miles (5 km) north-east of Errol, in the Braes of the Carse, on the fringes of the Sidlaw Hills. Thus it overlooks both the Carse of Gowrie and the Firth of Tay and beyond into the Kingdom of Fife. The name derives from Gaelic fionn-gasg: a white or light-coloured appendage.

Fingask was once an explicitly holy place, a convenient and numinous stop-off between the abbeys at Falkirk and Scone. It was later held by the Bruce family, and then by the Threiplands. In the eighteenth century it was owned by Jacobites and was forfeited. The castle is a Category B listed building, and the estate is included on the Inventory of Historic Gardens and Designed Landscapes, the national register of significant gardens.

Fingas Castle letterhead

== Visual architectural history ==
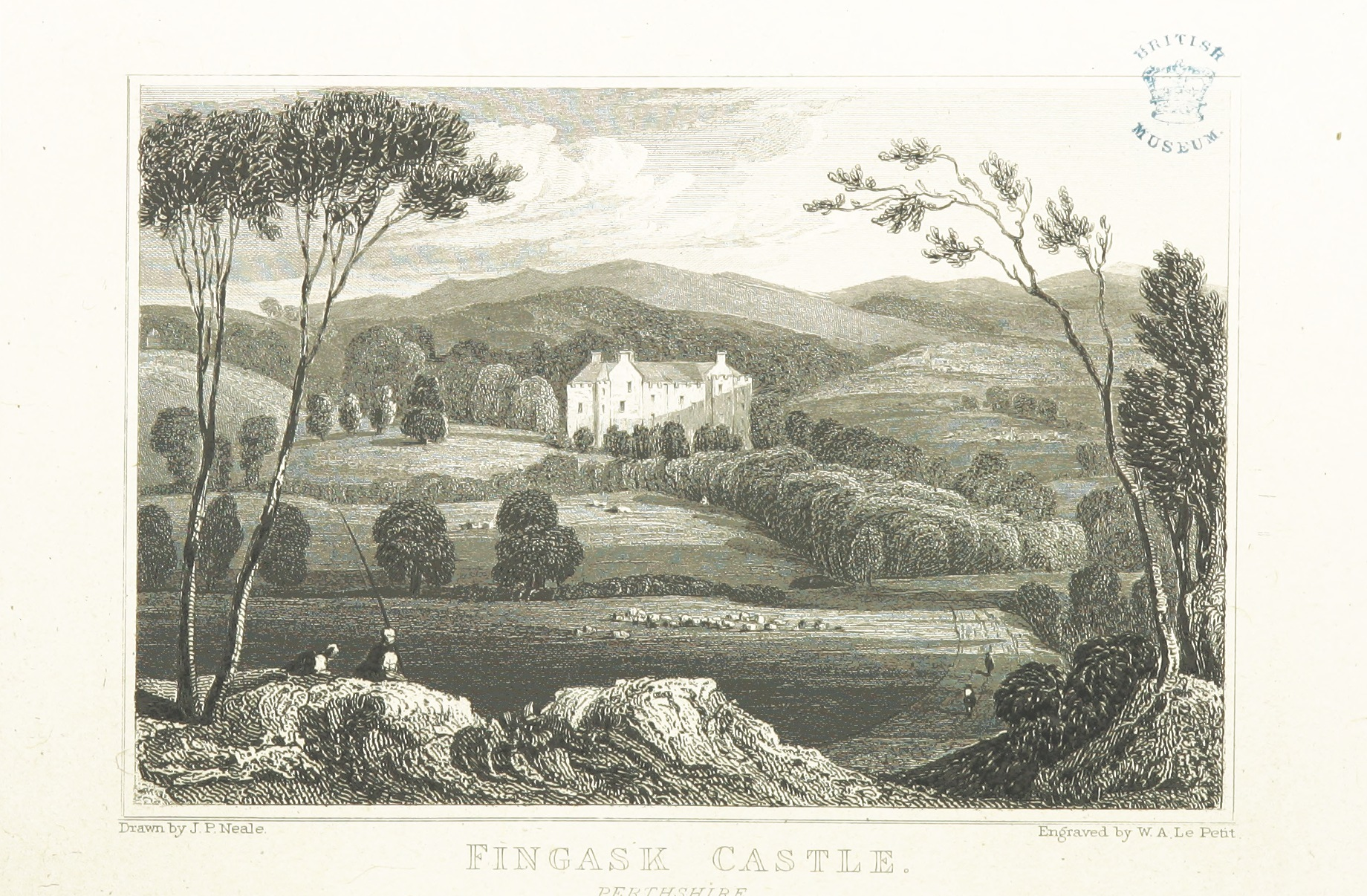
John Preston Neale, 1824.

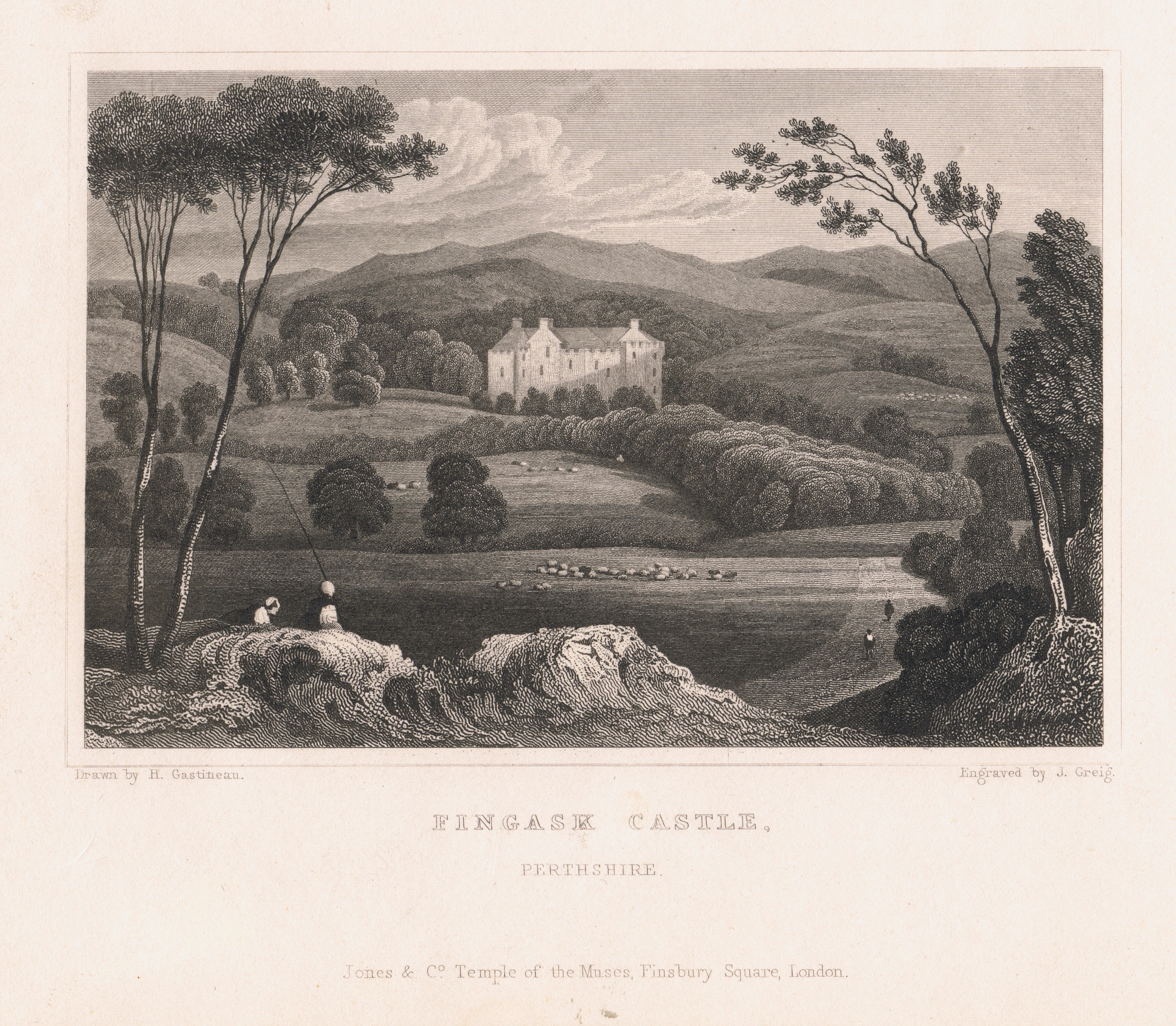
Copper-plate engraving, John Greig after a drawing by Henry Gastineau, c. 1830.

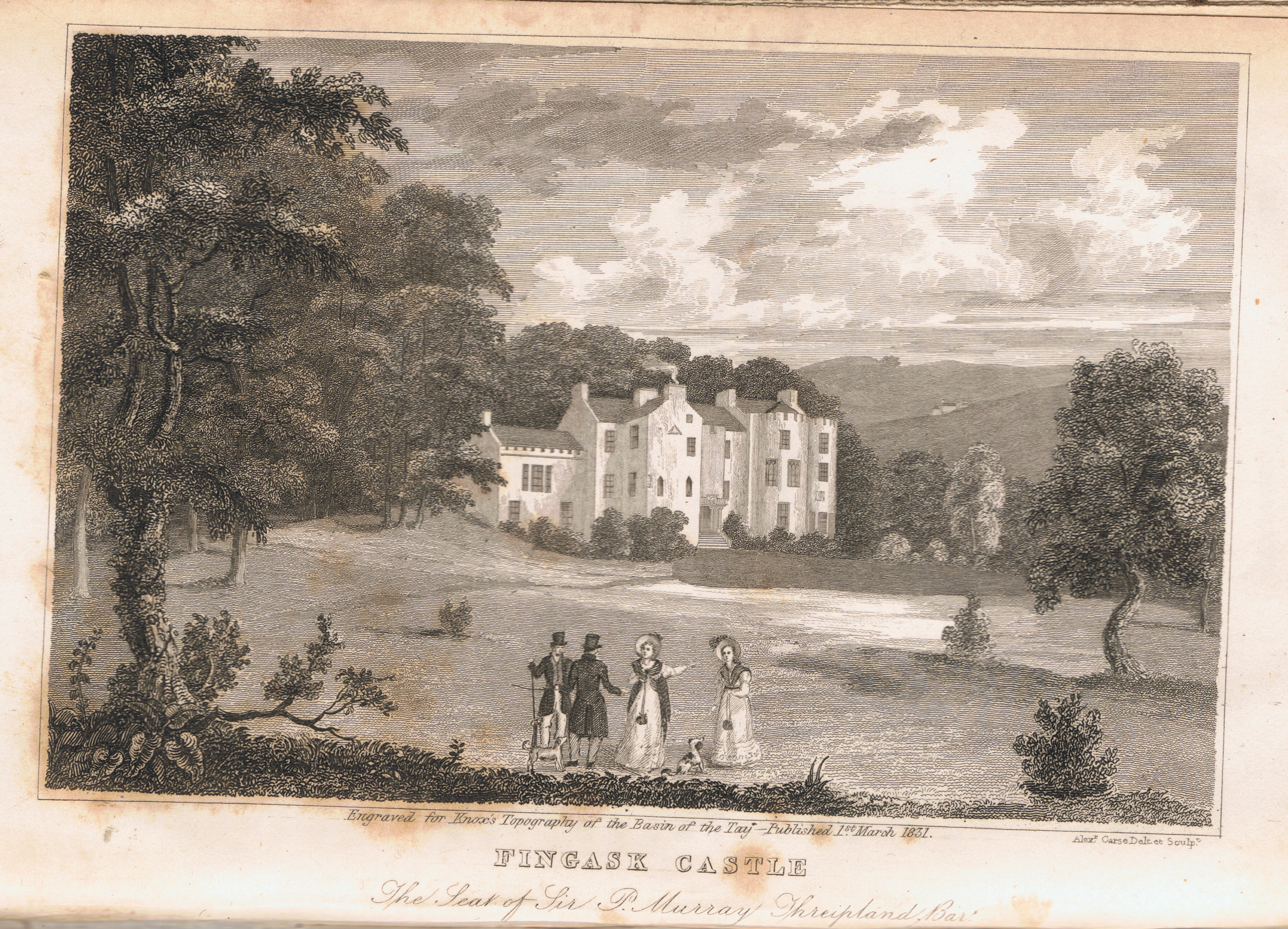
Fingask, from the south, drawn and engraved by Alexander Carse, c. 1831.

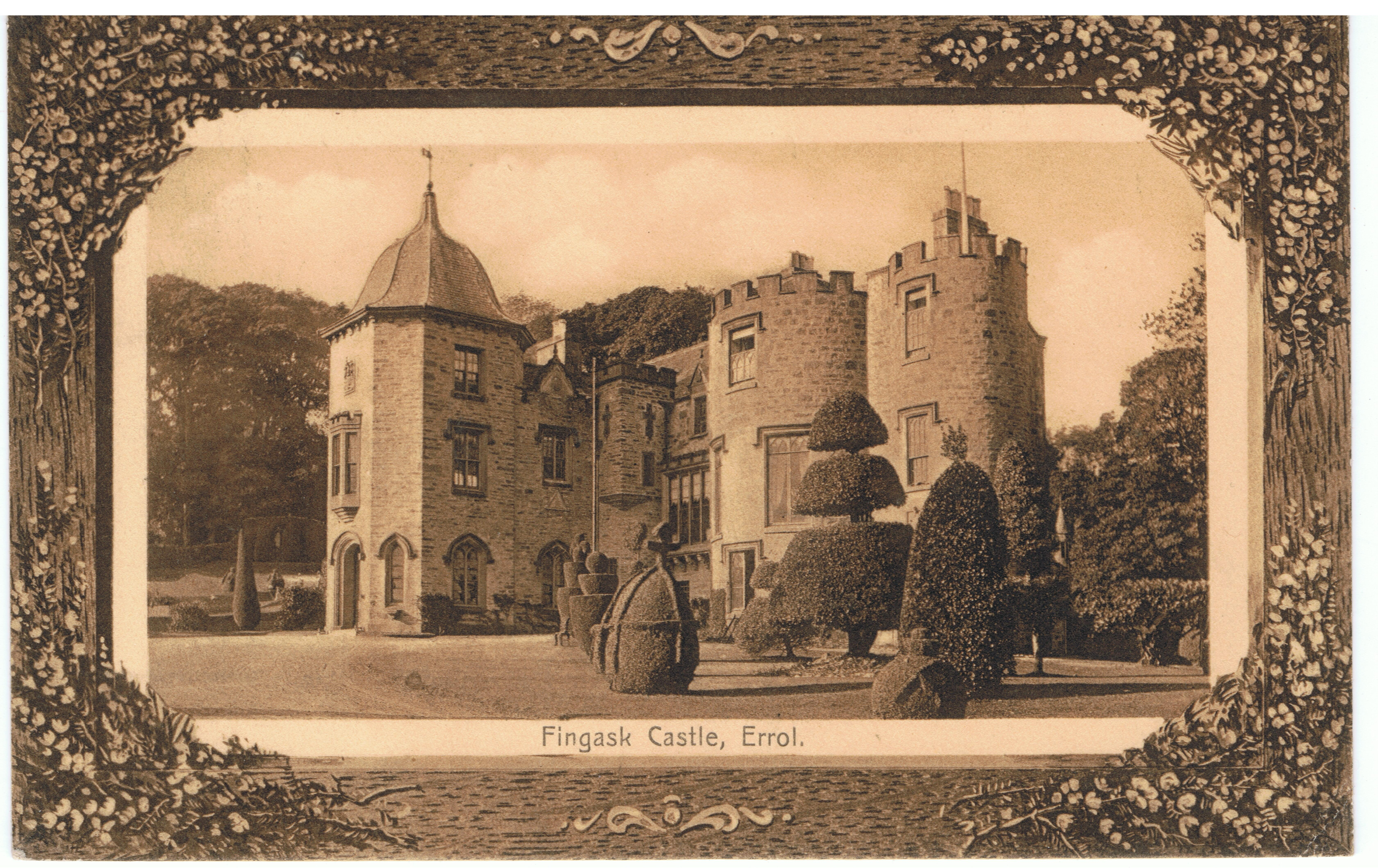
Post card of Fingask Castle, N.B., sent from Errol to Oxford, franked 15 August 1910.

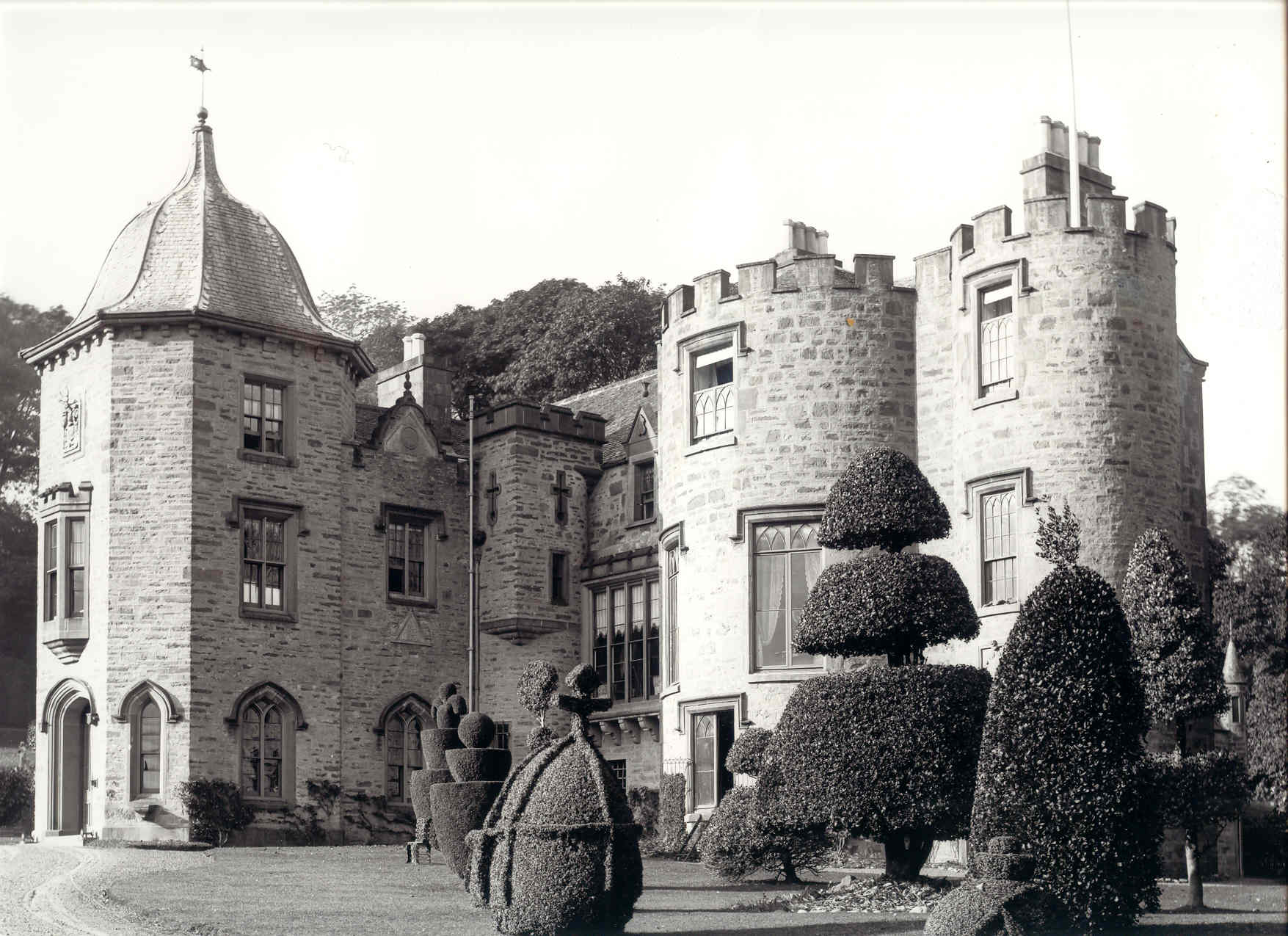
Castle from the south south east showing lost 19th-century embellishments.

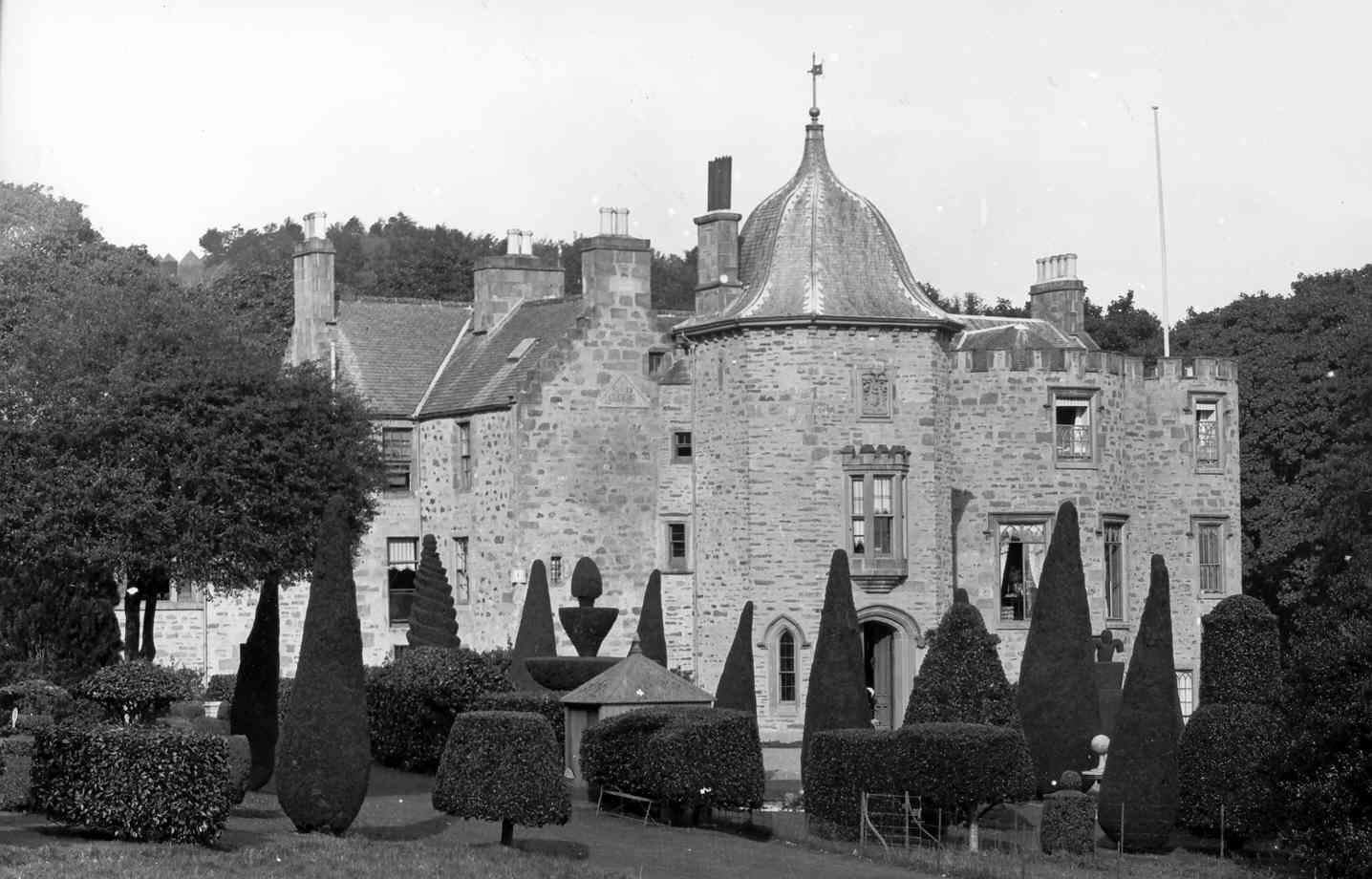
Showing pre-1920s and post-1830 state of castle and garden, from south-west.

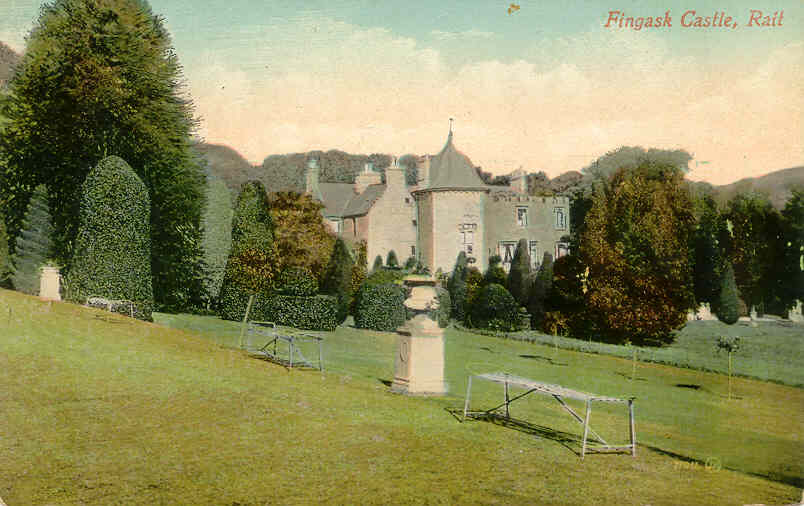
Postcard, pre-1920, view from the south-south-west.

== History ==
There are mentions of the lands of Fingask in the Foundation Charter of the Abbey of Scone by Alexander I. The date of the charter is said to be 1114 or 1115. The Bruce family owned the lands of Rait, including Fingask, from the 15th century. The Bruces were descended from the senior line of the Bruces of Clackmannan, which included Sir David Bruce who married Janet, daughter of Sir William Stirling of Keir. Their son, Robert Bruce held charter of Rate (Rait) in 1484, confirmed 1488, and his son David resigned his right to Clackmannan to his uncle in February 1506/7. At the time when Patrick Bruce was laird, a stone was set into the house showing the date 1594. A tombstone near the ruined church of Rait reveals:

"Here lies Jonet Gibsone, spouse to William Bruce
Laird of Fingask who bore him ... children
Whereof five males was left behind her, who
Lived together the space of 18 yeers
And of her age the space of 33 yeers
She died the last of Aprule Ano. Domi. 1647."

Around 1660 the mercat cross (market cross) from nearby Perth was relocated to the grounds of Fingask.

The last of the Bruce lairds of Fingask was Laurence Bruce, whose "pecuniary involvements necessitated the sale of the estate for the behoof of his creditors in the year 1671".

=== Threipland baronets ===
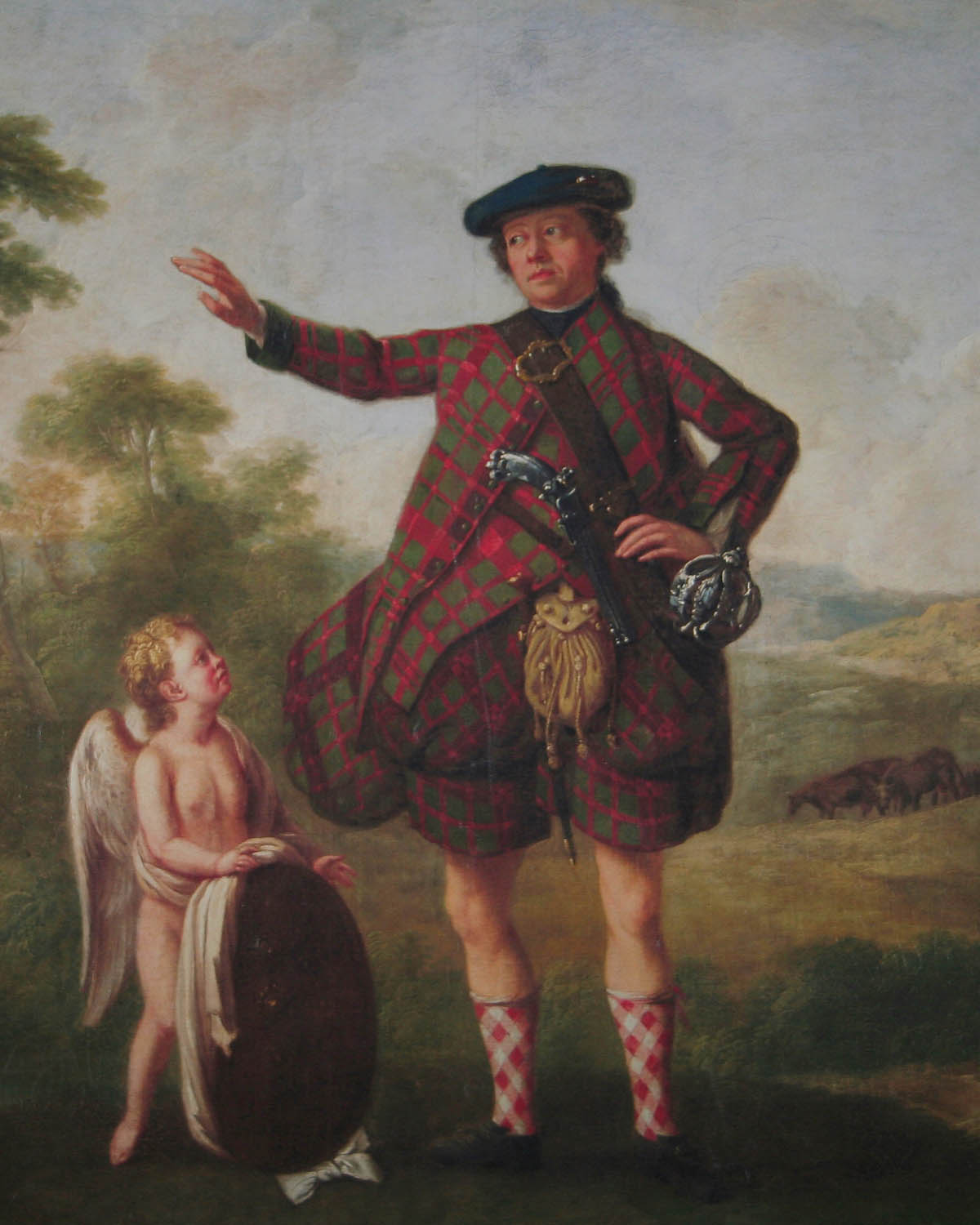
Detail of William Delacour's painting of Dr. Sir Stuart Threipland, of Fingask (1716–1805), physician to Bonnie Prince Charlie during the Jacobite rising of 1745, and President of the Royal Medical Society from 1766–1770

In 1672 Patrick Threipland purchased the estate, which was erected into a barony the same year. He renovated the building and laid out the gardens, and in 1674 he added the neighbouring Braes of the Carse tower house and estate of Kinnaird to his realm. The same year he was knighted for his diligence in the suppression of conventiclers, and in 1687 he was created a baronet of Nova Scotia, although he died a prisoner at Stirling Castle for adherence to the ousted King James VII, in 1689.

His son David, 2nd Baronet, (c.1670–1746) joined the Jacobite rising of 1715, and fought with the Earl of Mar against the government at the Battle of Sheriffmuir. When the rising failed, the baronetcy was attainted by act of parliament and Fingask and its estate was forfeited. Fingask was purchased for £9,606 6s 4.5d by the York Buildings Company, an English waterworks company which had begun to specialise in forfeited land. The company held the property until 1783, meanwhile leasing it to Dame Katherine (Kattrin) Threipland, "the lass of Gowrie" (d. 18 March 1762), daughter of the 2nd baronet.

Fingask Castle was badly damaged in 1745 by government troops, as the Threiplands once more supported the Jacobites in the second Jacobite rising. David Threipland (1694–1745), son of the 2nd baronet, was killed at the Battle of Prestonpans. His half-brother Dr. Stuart Threipland (1716–1805), repurchased Fingask in 1783 at a sale of forfeited land, for £12,207. He married firstly at St. Paul's, Edinburgh, in 1753, Jannet, daughter of David Sinclair of Southdun, Caithness, and secondly at St. Paul's Edinburgh, in 1761, Jannet daughter of Richard Murray of Pennyland, heiress of her cousin Grizel Budge (d. 1798) of Dale & Toftingall, Halkirk, Caithness. His sister Miss Euphame ("Aunt Effie") Threipland (1713- ) is said to have run the estate in his absence. Dr Threipland was President of the Royal Medical Society from 1766.

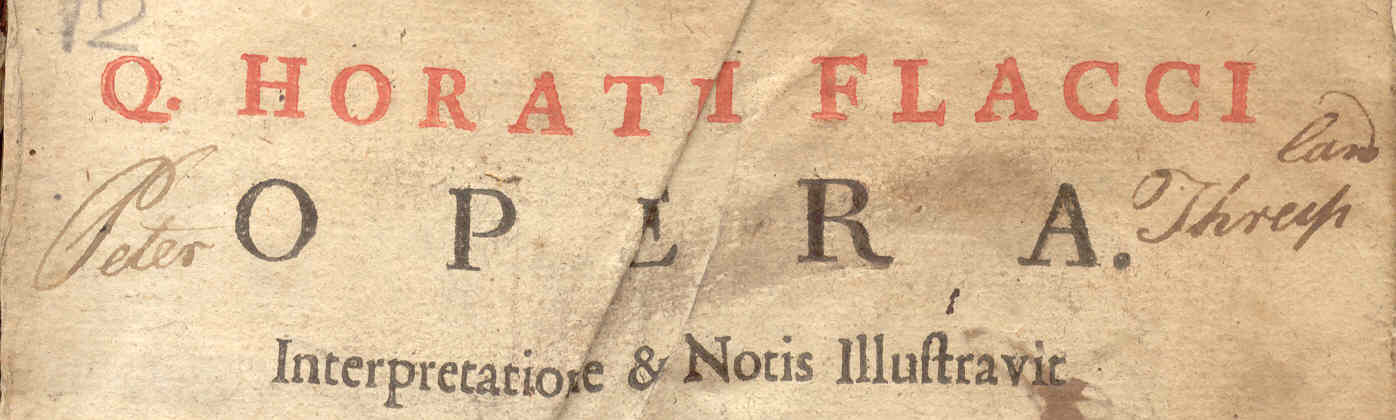
Steuart and Peter Threipland's Q. Horatii Flacci Opera, Ludovicus Desprez, London, 1699

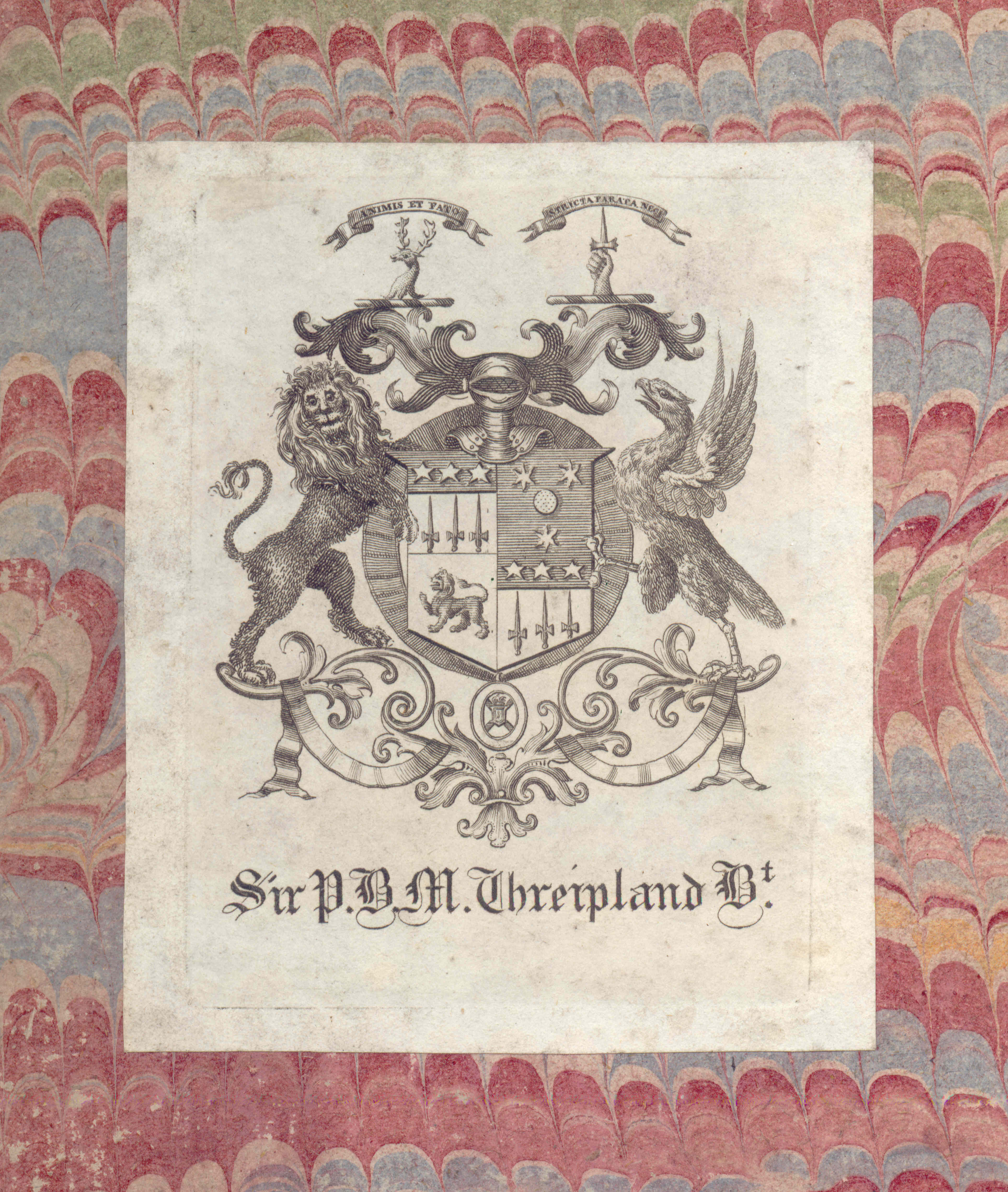
Bookplate of Sir Patrick Budge Murray Threipland, 4th Bart. (1762–1837), in a copy of a 1761 Book of Common Prayer

In 1826, the attainder of 1715 was repealed by Act of Parliament, and Sir Patrick (aka Peter) Budge Murray Threipland (1762–1837), an advocate, was restored to the dignity of a baronet. He later served as Deputy Lieutenant for Perthshire and Caithness. In 1792 he married his first cousin once-removed Jessy (d. 1855), daughter of William Scott Kerr of Chatto or Thirlestane. Her grandmother was a daughter of Sir David Threipland, 2nd Bt., by his first wife. Between 1828 and 1831 Sir Patrick added to the front west part of the house. Embellishment and building onto the south front continued until 1840.

Sir Patrick-Murray (aka Peter) Threipland, 5th Bt (1800–1882), was educated in Edinburgh and Paris. He served as a major in the Perth militia, retiring in 1843, and was a Commissioner for Supply for the counties of Perth and Caithness. He was also a Justice of the Peace and Deputy Lieutenant of Perth and Caithness.

Before and after his mother died in 1855 he lived at Fingask with his three elder sisters. The UK Census of 31 March 1851 records a staff of seven at Fingask: Housekeeper (Jean Oswald); Ladies Maid (Mary Gray); Cook (Margaret Stewart); Sir Peter's House Maid (Mary McLagan); Butler (David Chalmers); Footman (John Bertram); and Coachman (Andrew David). Mrs Drummond of Megginch Castle described the family:

"Sir Patrick Threipland lived there, and occasionally at Toftingall, Caithness, with his three sisters Miss Jessie [c.1796–1871] the clever, agreable hostess; Miss Eliza [c.1798- ], sarcastic and sharp tongued, the manager of the stables; and Miss Catherine [c.1799- ], the gardener – much less clever, but with far more sweetness than either of her sisters."

When Miss Jessie died in May 1871, Mrs Drummond reported that the "life of the old house went out". On the death of Sir Patrick in 1882, the Threipland Baronetcy became dormant. Fingask was left to his first cousin's second son, William Scott Kerr, who subsequently changed his name to William Murray Threipland. In 1915 he was appointed to command the newly raised Welsh Guards, and became Colonel of the regiment in 1937.

=== Other owners ===
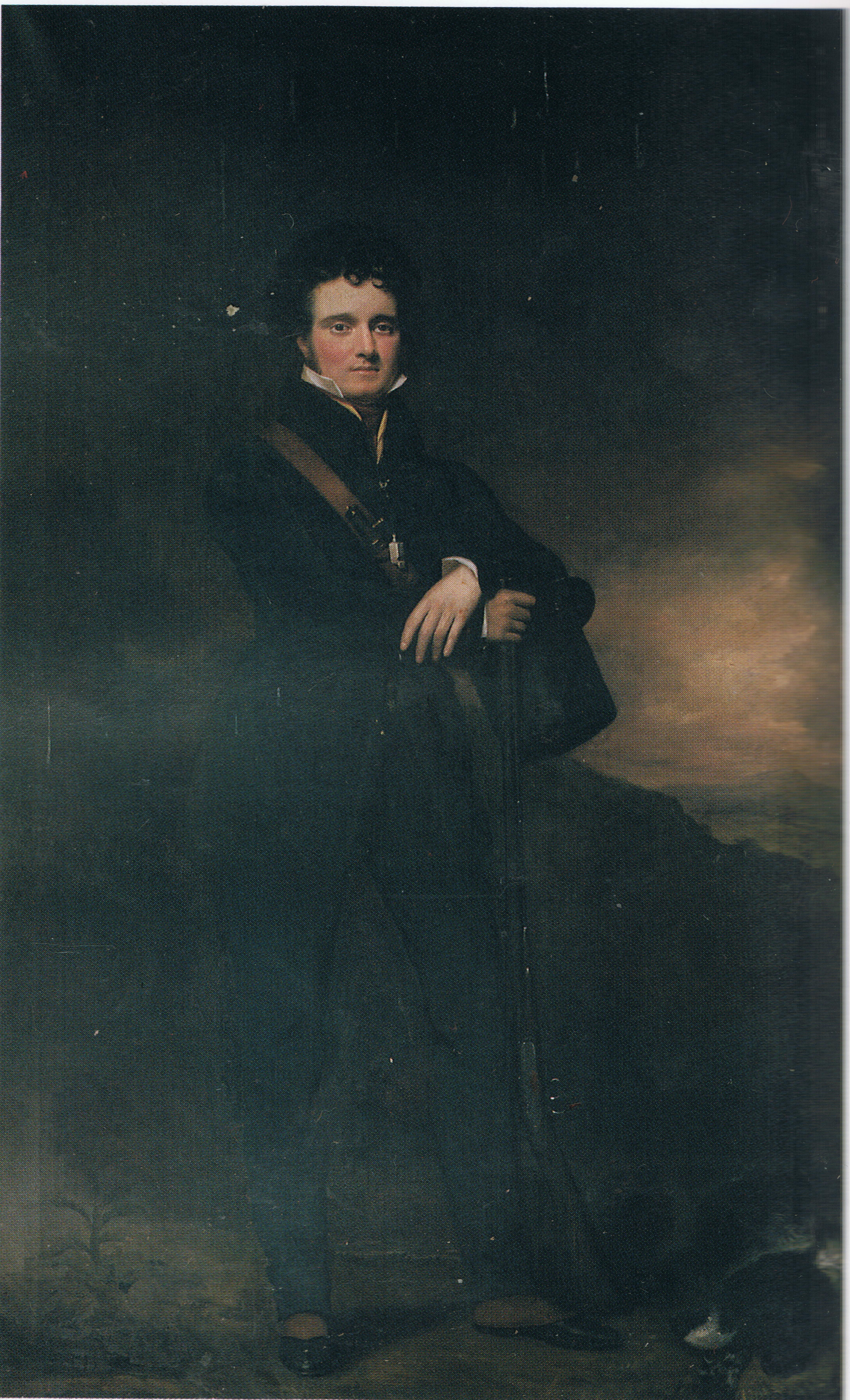
Sir Patrick Murray Threipland, 5th Baronet (1800–1882), attributed to Sir John Watson Gordon (95 x 60 inches).

The castle passed out of the Threipland family again in 1917, when it was bought by whisky merchant Sir John Henderson Stewart, 1st Baronet. In 1917 the Fingask estate was made up of 2,587 acres (10 km^{2}). This comprised arable 1,070 acres (4 km^{2}), hill 1,400 acres (6 km^{2}), and woods 116 acres (0.5 km^{2}). The rental of the Fingask, and those of the much smaller estates of Kinnaird, and Inchmichael (which he had added), had given Sir John an annual rental return of £4,000. Sir John became heavily indebted due to the Prohibition of alcohol in the United States, and committed suicide at Fingask on 6 February 1924. The estate was bought by H. B. Gilroy of Ballumbie in 1925. The house was saved from ruin but wholly re-modelled, all spiral staircases removed and nineteenth-century frontal additions demolished.

=== Return to the Threipland family ===
In 1969 the estate returned to the Threipland family, when it was bought by Mark Stepney Murray Threipland, grandson of Colonel William Murray Threipland. He was the son of Patrick Murray Threipland and his first wife, Marged Howard Stepney (a descendant of the 2nd Lord De Tabley and Jerome de Salis, amongst many others). By this time the estate had been reduced to 75 acres (30 ha). In 1996 Fingask was bought by Andrew Murray Threipland, son of Patrick Murray Threipland and his second wife, Leslie McNair Scott. In 2020, Threipland revealed plans to transform part of the estate known as Witches Knowe into a barrow cemetery, with over one thousand burial plots, as well as creating a semi-underground candle-lit chamber in which relatives can deposit the ashes of their relatives.

== Portraits of people associated with Fingask, and the Threipland shield in 1880 ==
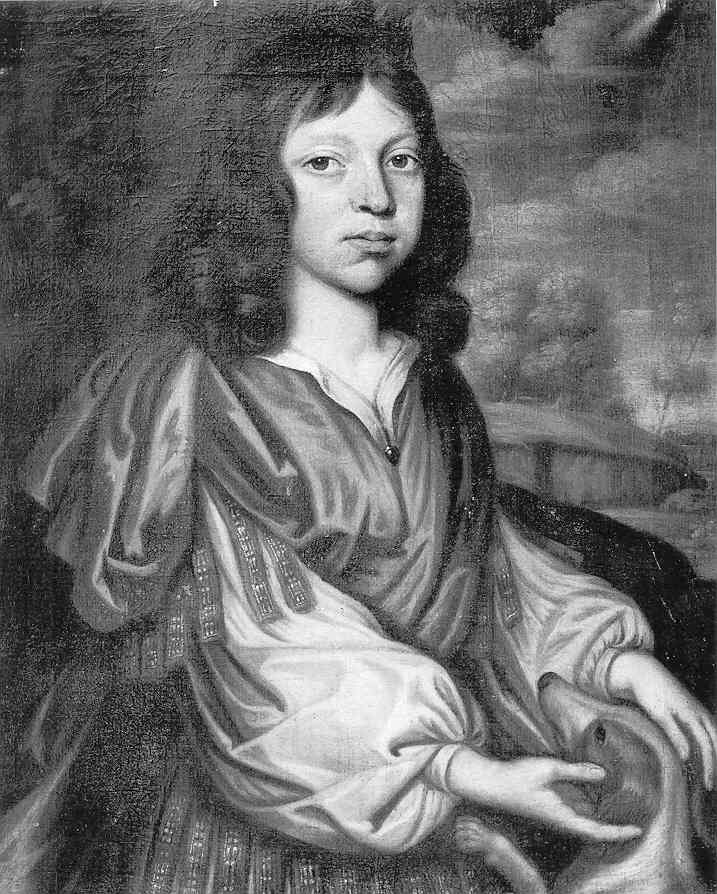
Sir David Threipland (1666–1746), 2nd Bart., as a boy

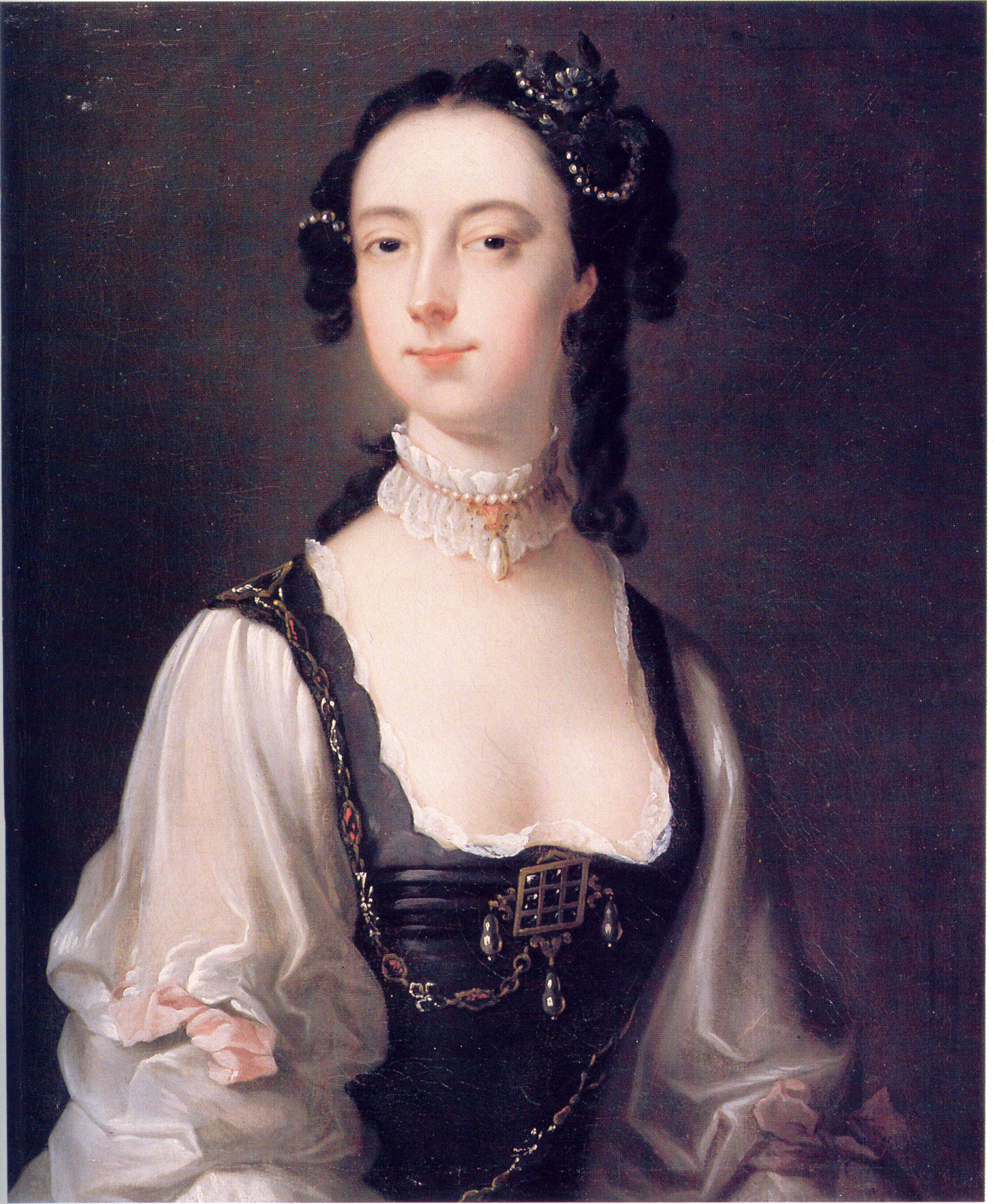
Dame Katherine (c. 1679–1762), daughter of David Smythe of Barnhill, and second wife to Sir David Threipland

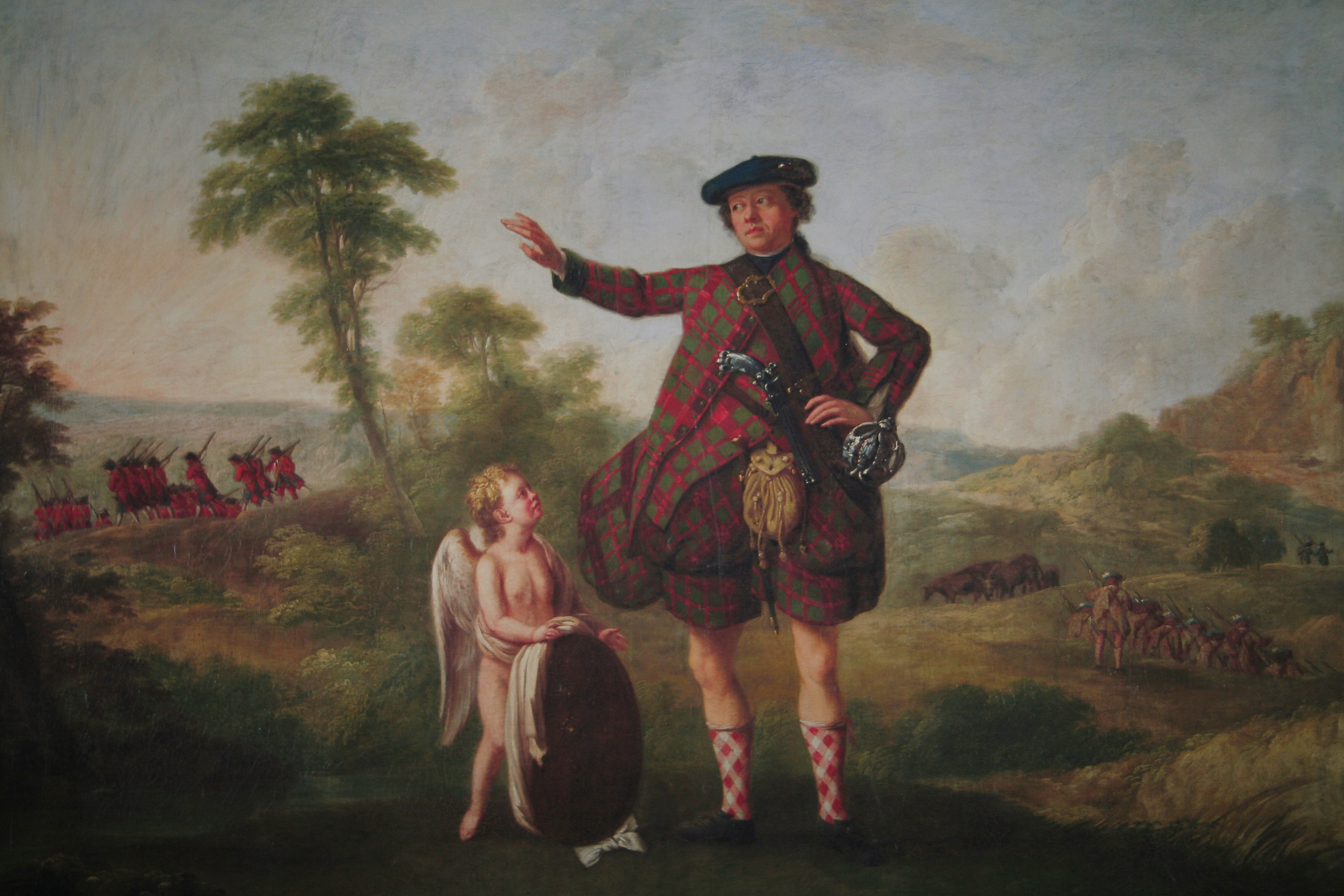
Dr. (Sir) Stuart Threipland

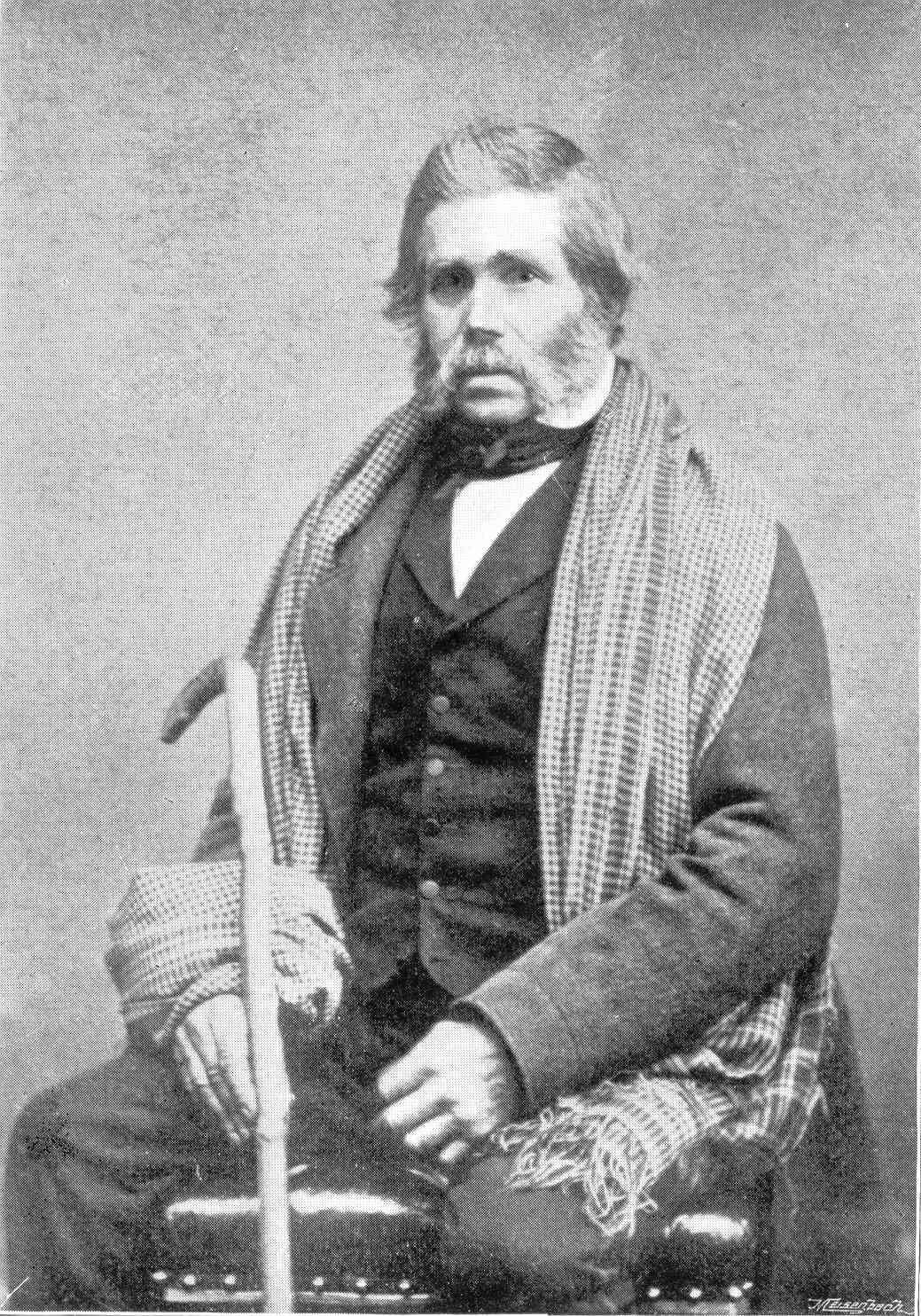
Charles Spence (1779–1869); the Bard of Gowrie, the Poet of the Carse, footman and mason to the Threiplands

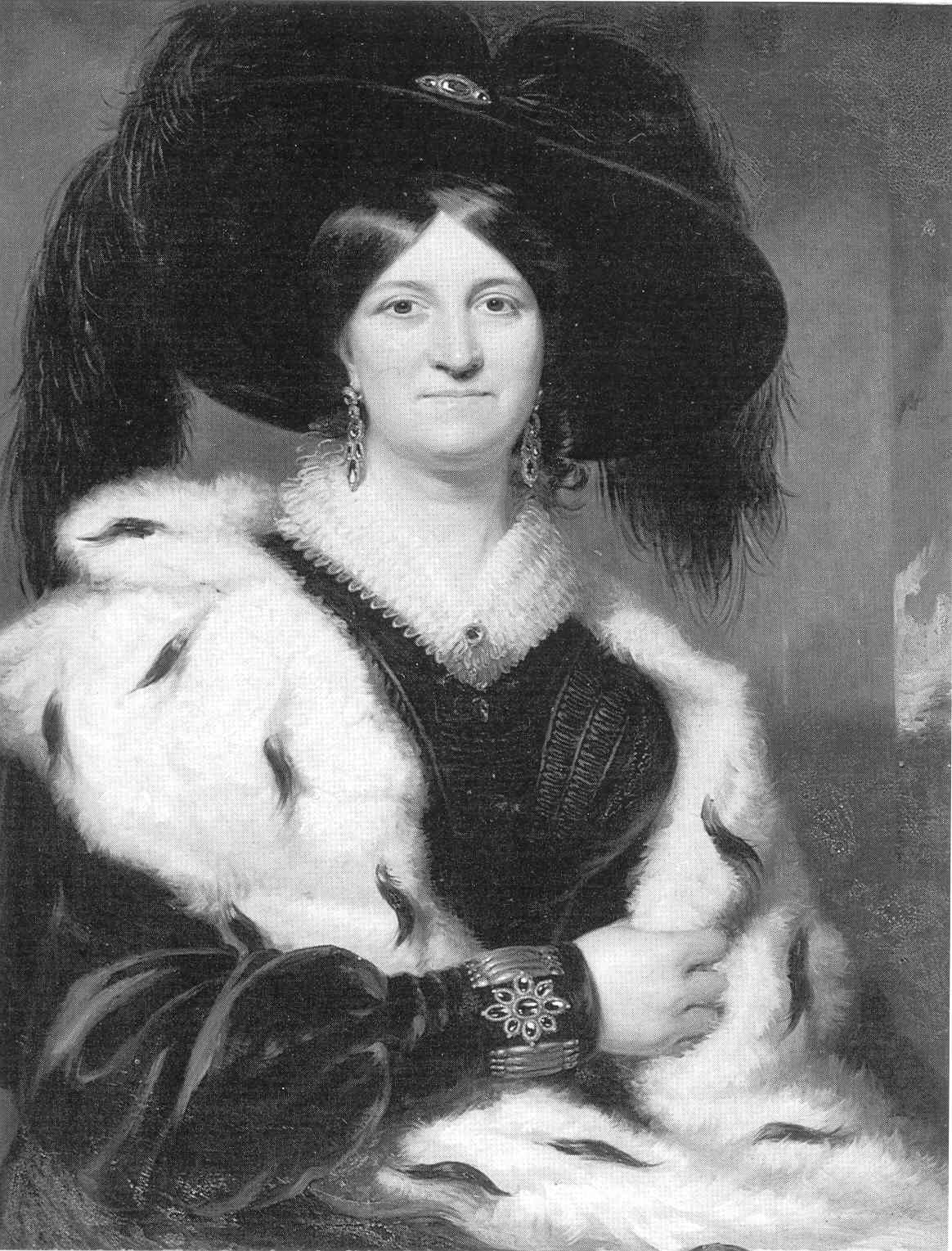
Jessy Scott Kerr married her cousin Sir Patrick Threipland in 1792. They had four children. She died in 1855.

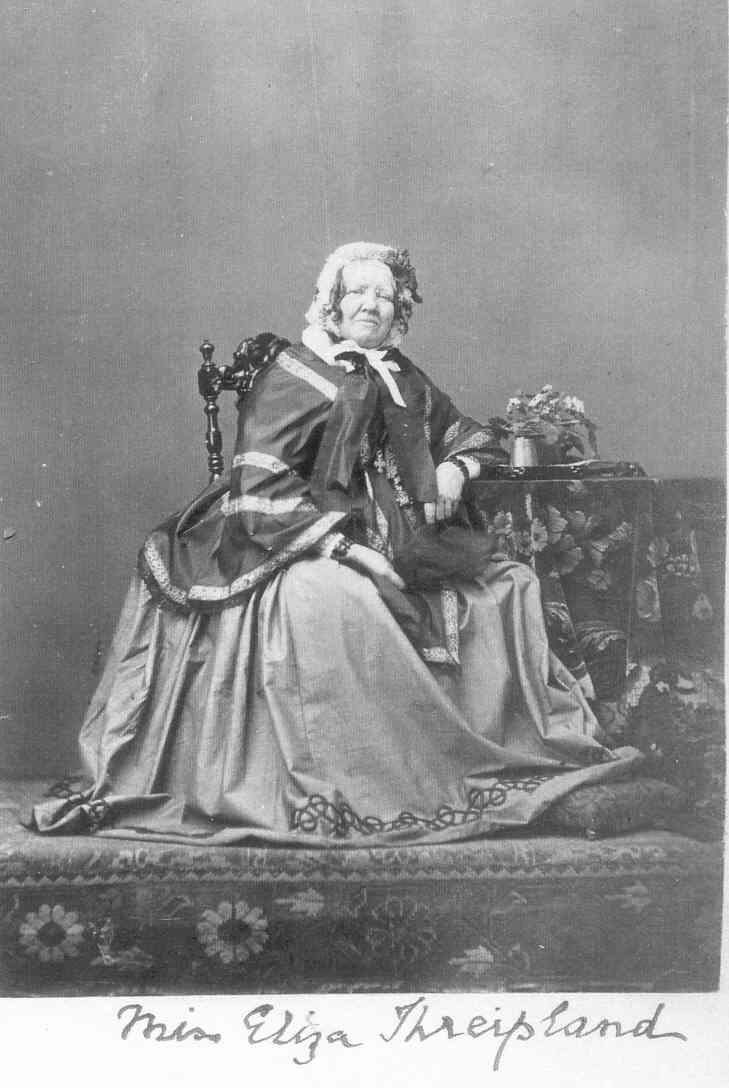
Eliza Threipland

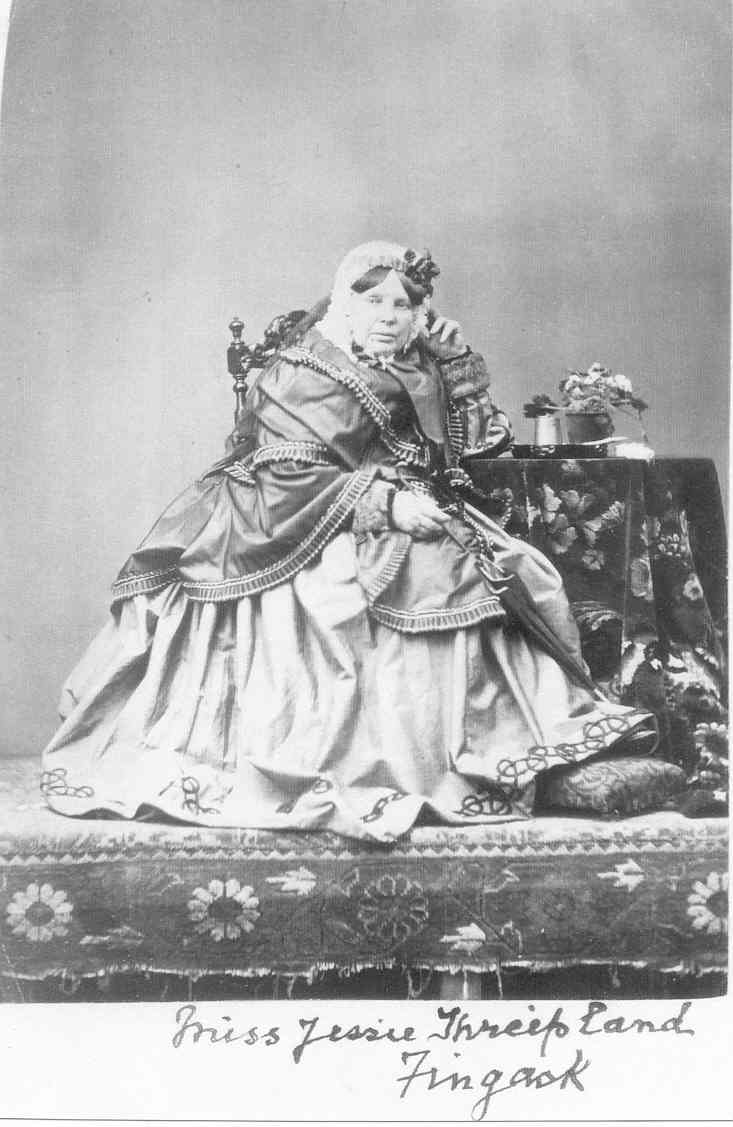
Jessie Threipland

== The castle ==
The castle itself is dated 1592, and was built around a 12th-century structure. Between 1828 and 1840 additions were made to the south and west of the castle. Sir Patrick Threipland, 4th Baronet (1762–1837) laid out the park, and his son planted the topiary gardens and installed statuary.

== Gardens ==
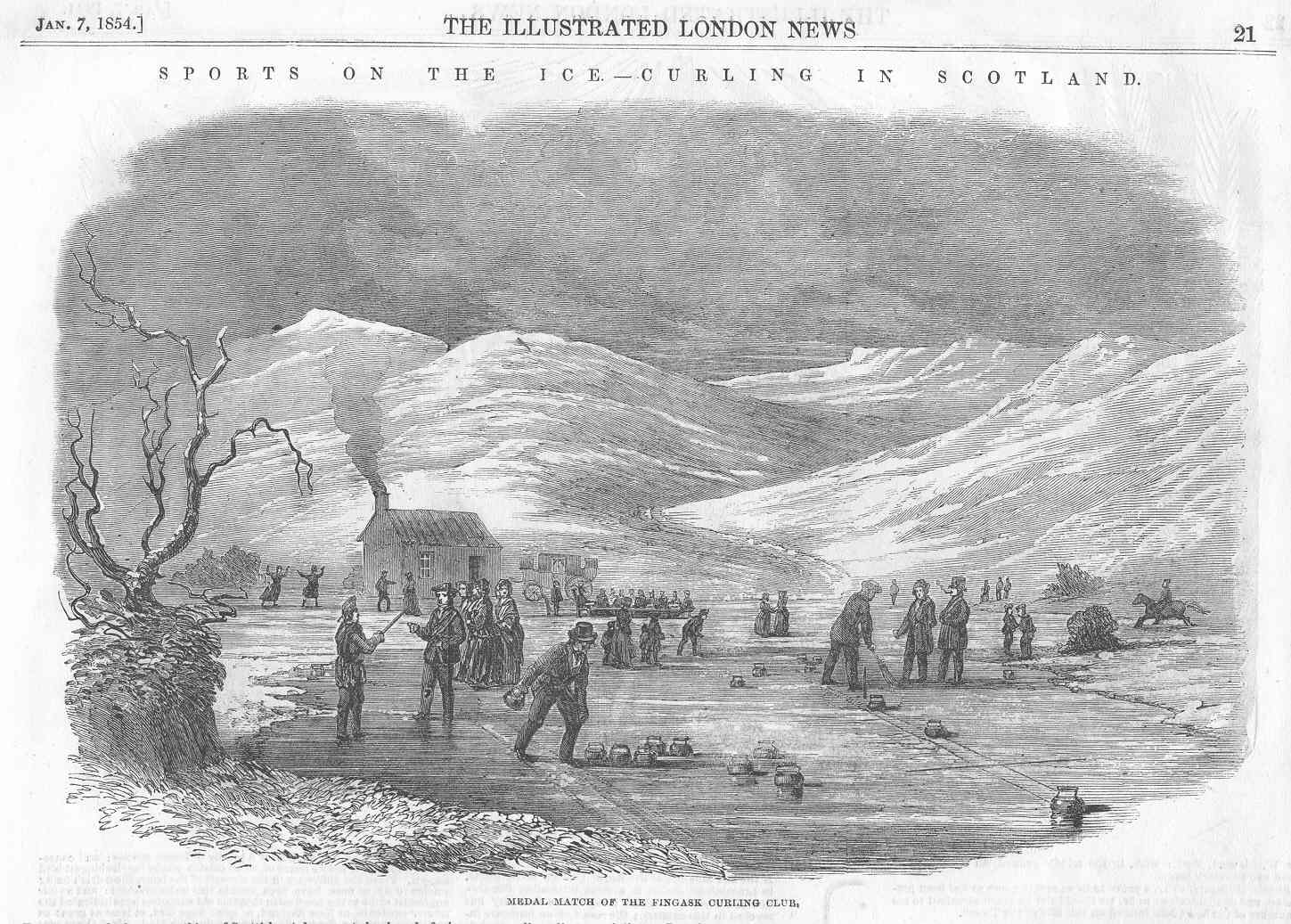
Fingask curling pond and curling house from the Illustrated London News, 7 January 1854, showing a match of 17 February 1853, sketch by H. H. Milne

The garden is renowned for its topiary, but also features The Pavilion, a picturesque venue for things such as colloquia and wedding parties. There are statues by David Anderson, sculptor, of Perth, of characters from Scots literature. Works depicted include Alexander Wilson's Watty and Meg, Burns' Willie Brew’d a Peck o’ Maut, And Rab and Allan cam’ tae Pree, Sir Walter Scott's Last Minstrel/Ossian, and Burns' Tam O' Shanter and Kate. By other sculptors are also to be found the naked black figure of Doryphoros; a full length statue of William Pitt the Younger, and some small pieces by Charles Spence. Off the drive, in a sheltered glen, is the Well of St. Peter with the Linn-ma-Gray flowing beside it. On a stone above the well are the appropriate lines:

Drink, weary pilgrim, drink and pray
And bless St. Peter's well,
Unscathed by sun or scorching ray,
Or frost or thawing swell

Perth mercat cross was moved to the grounds of the castle after being deemed an obstruction to street traffic in Perth's city centre.

== Views of the garden at Fingask ==
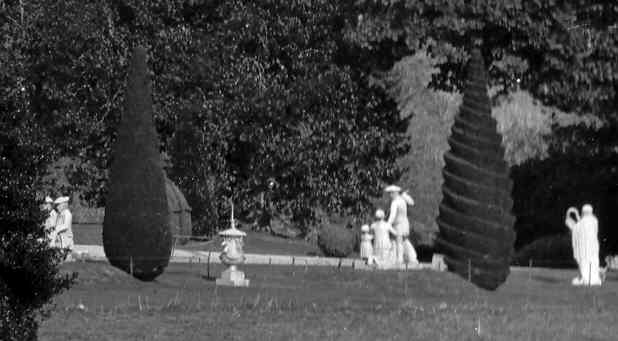
Statuary, by Charles Spence, in nineteenth-century formation.

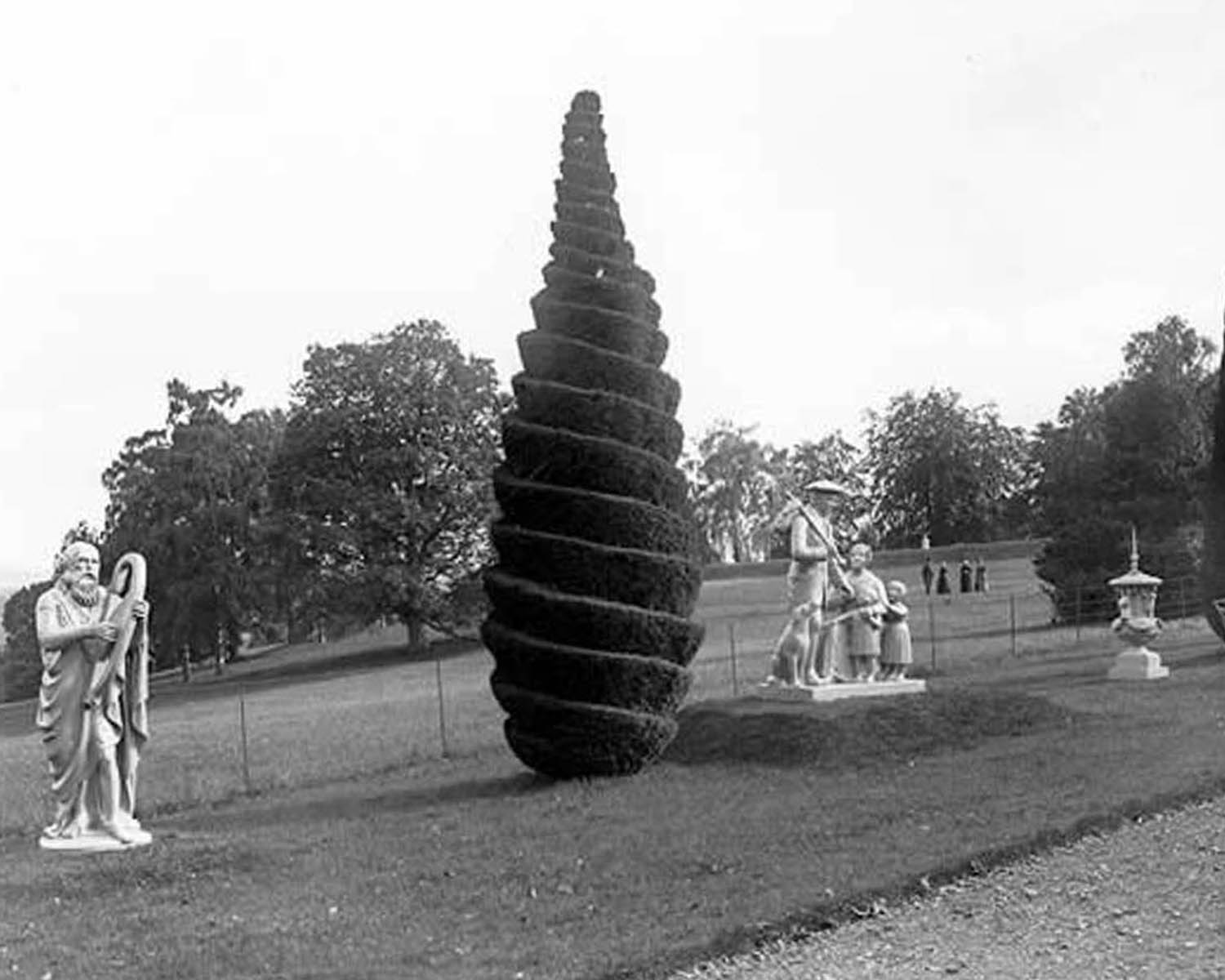
Statues looking south towards Fife.

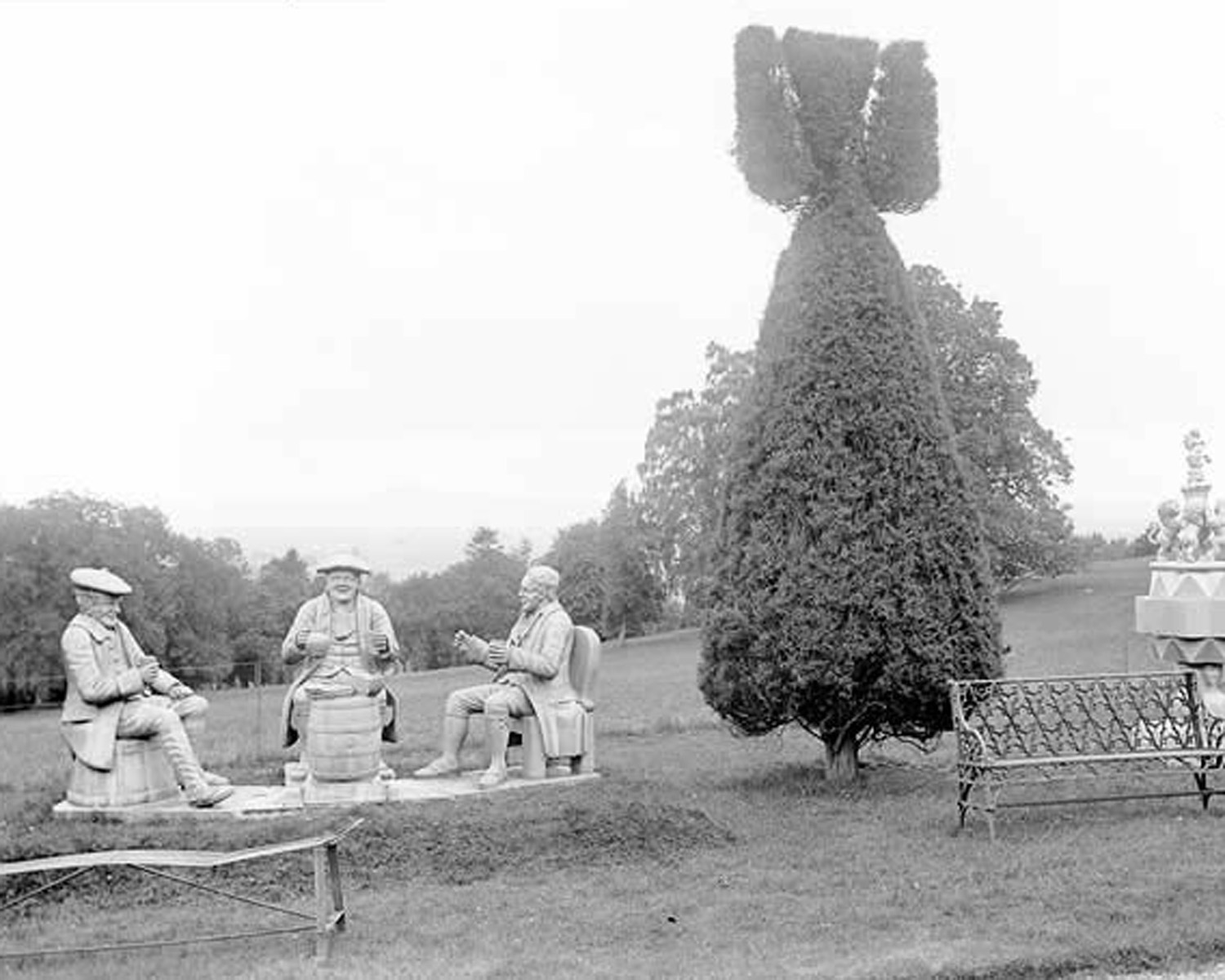
From the north. Tam O'Shanter, and his cronies drinking at Kirkton Jean's: ... While we sit bousing at the nappy, An' getting fou and unco happy,...

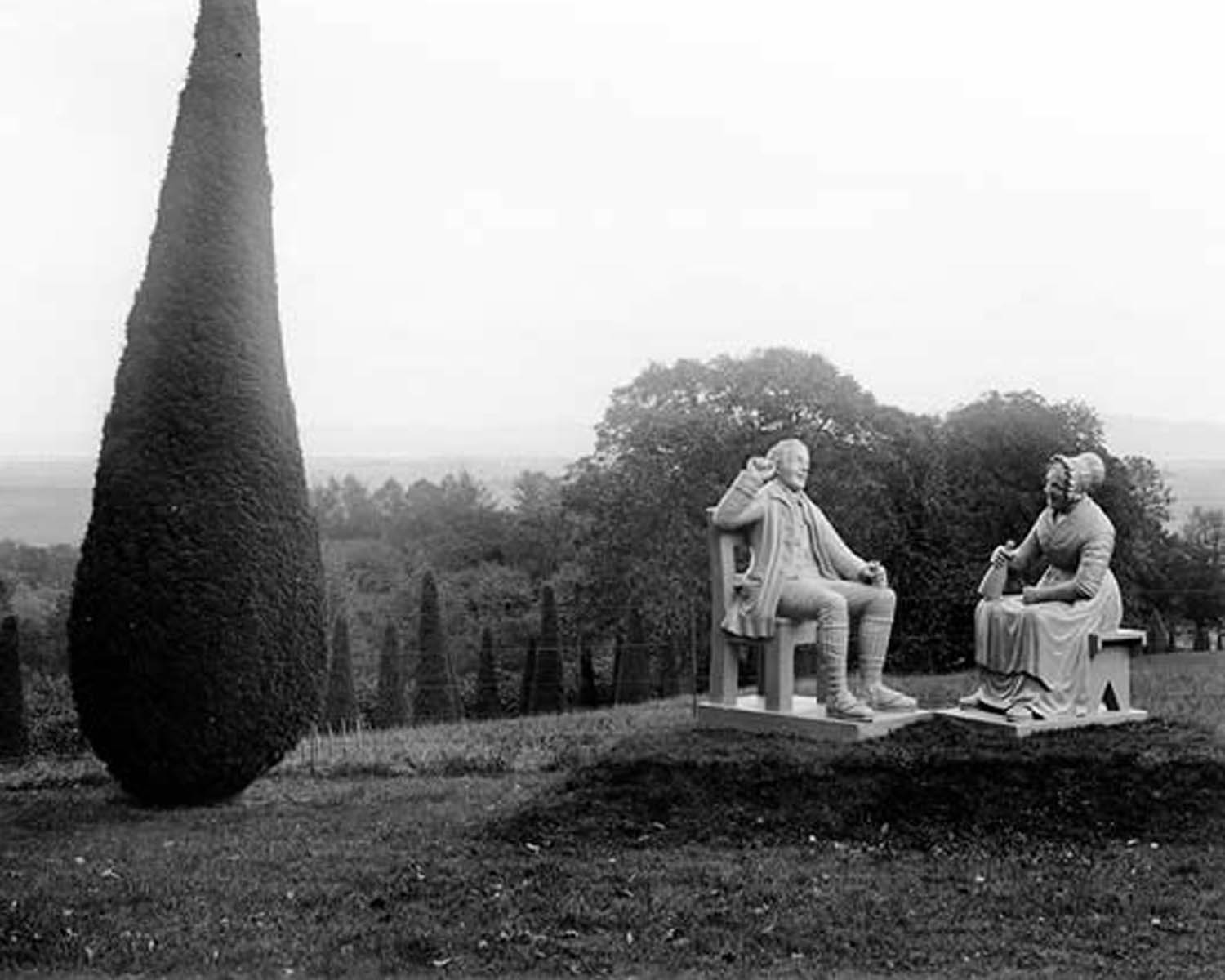
Wilson's Meg and Watty, by Charles Spence, seen from the north looking towards Fife.

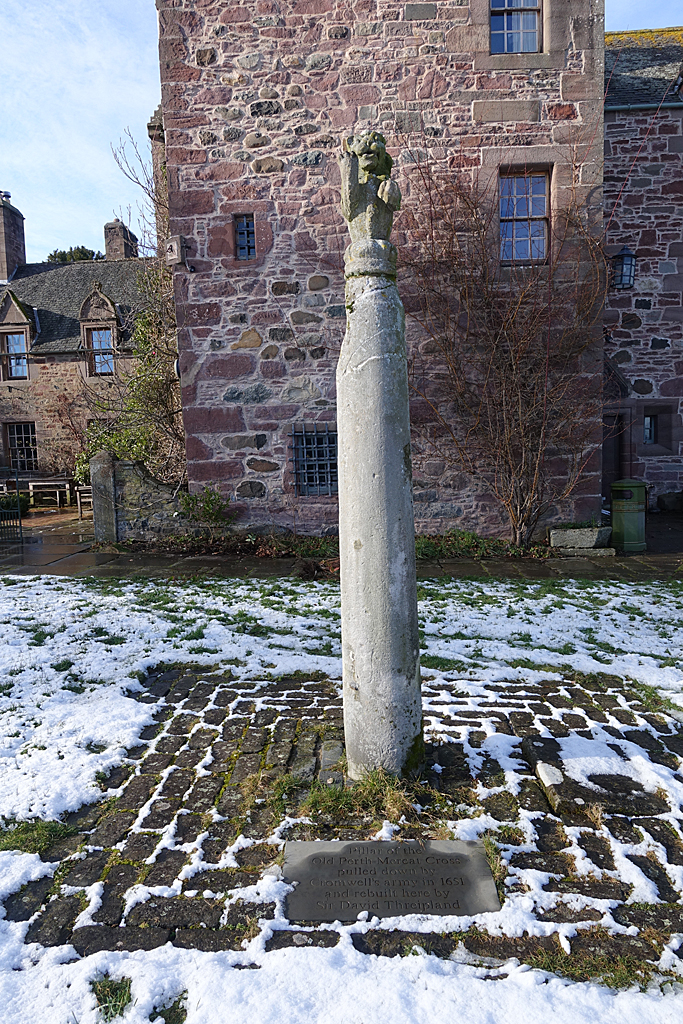
The old Perth mercat cross

== See also ==
- Fingask railway station
