= Rait =

Coordinates: 56°25′38″N 3°15′26″W

Rait: Scottish Gaelic: Ráth
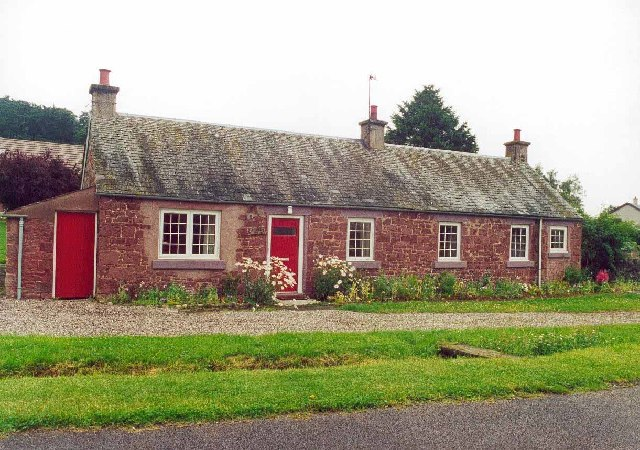
- The old post office in Rait

- Location within Perth and Kinross
- OS grid reference: NO252228
- Council area: Perth and Kinross
- Lieutenancy area: Perth and Kinross
- Country: Scotland
- Sovereign state: United Kingdom
- Post town: PERTH
- Postcode district: PH2
- Dialling code: 0182
- Police: Scotland
- Fire: Scottish
- Ambulance: Scottish
- UK Parliament: Perth and Kinross-shire
- Scottish Parliament: Perthshire North

Rait (/reɪt/; Scottish Gaelic: Ráth) is a small village in Perth and Kinross, Scotland. It lies 2 1/2 miles (4 kilometres) northwest of Errol, in the Gowrie area west of Dundee, on a minor road crossing the Sidlaw Hills through the Glen of Rait. The village is mainly residential with stone cottages, some modern developments and also features some single storey thatched cottages dating back to the 1700s or early 1800s which form a fermtoun. The former parish church, now ruined, was built in the Middle Ages, and abandoned in the 17th century when the parish of Rait was merged with Kilspindie. The remains of a prehistoric promontory fort lie to the east of the village. The 16th-century Fingask Castle is located to the north of the village, on the south-facing slopes of the Sidlaw Hills.
