= Alexander Brunton =

Scottish minister

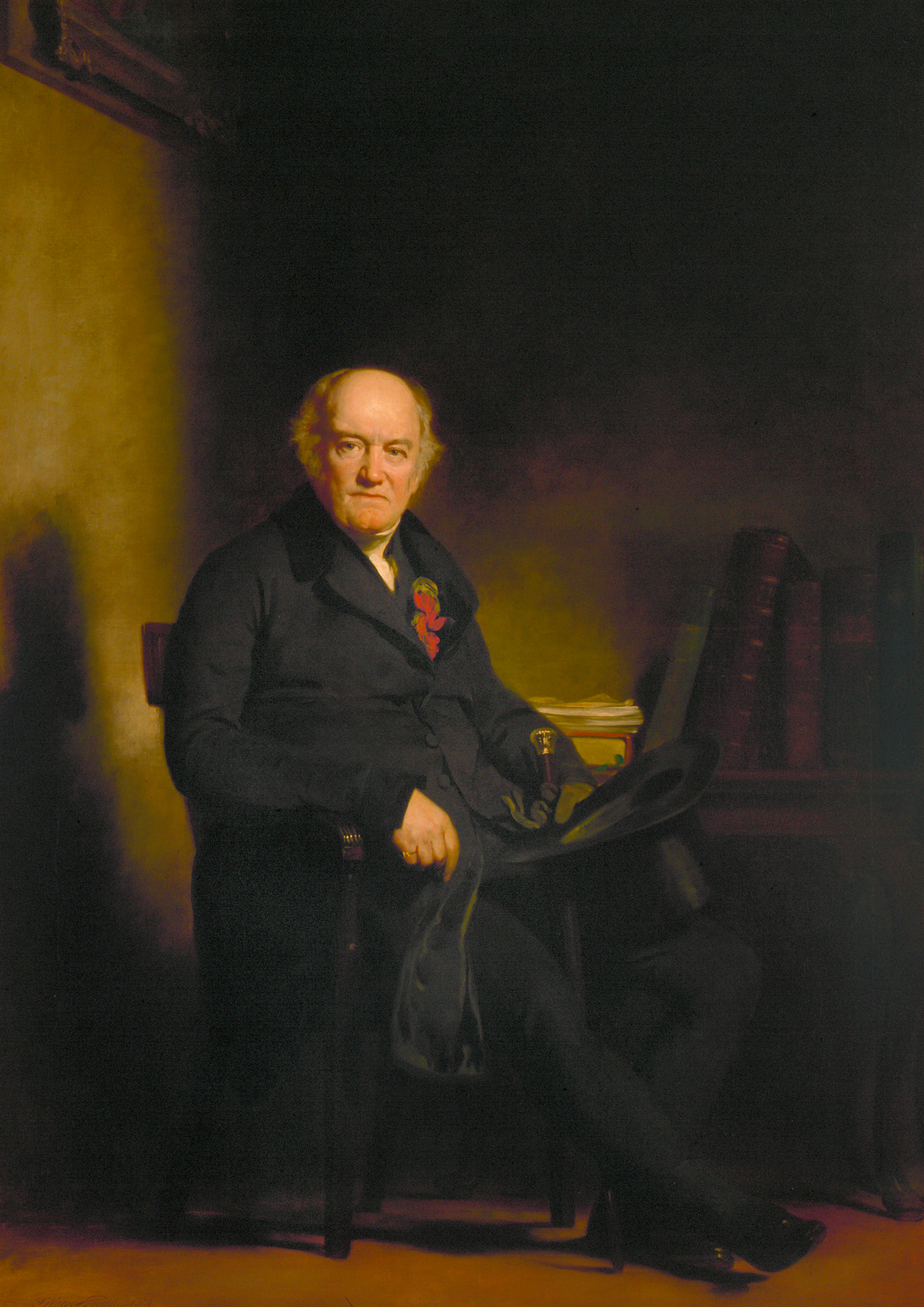
Alexander Brunton (Painting by John Watson Gordon)

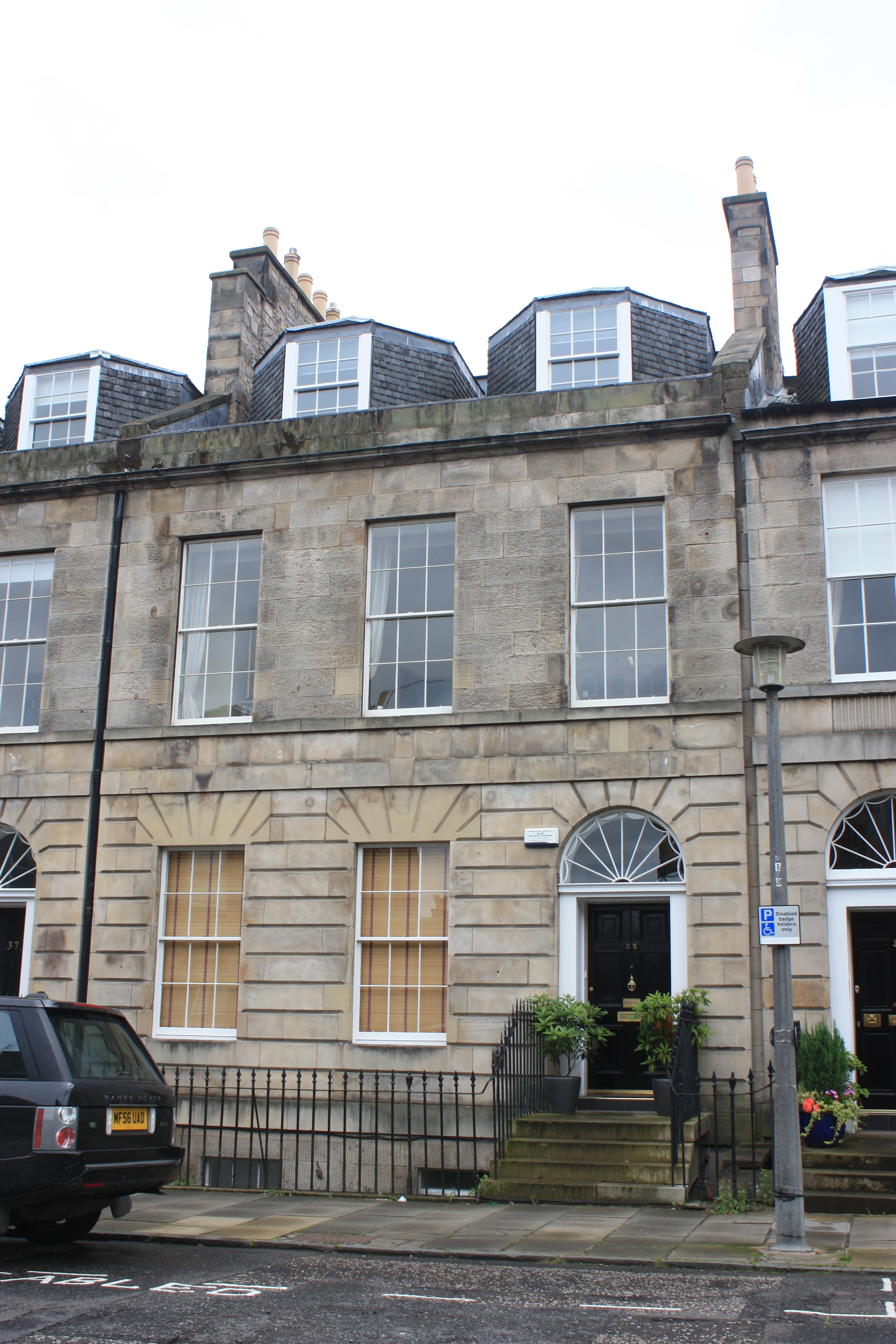
35 Albany St, Edinburgh

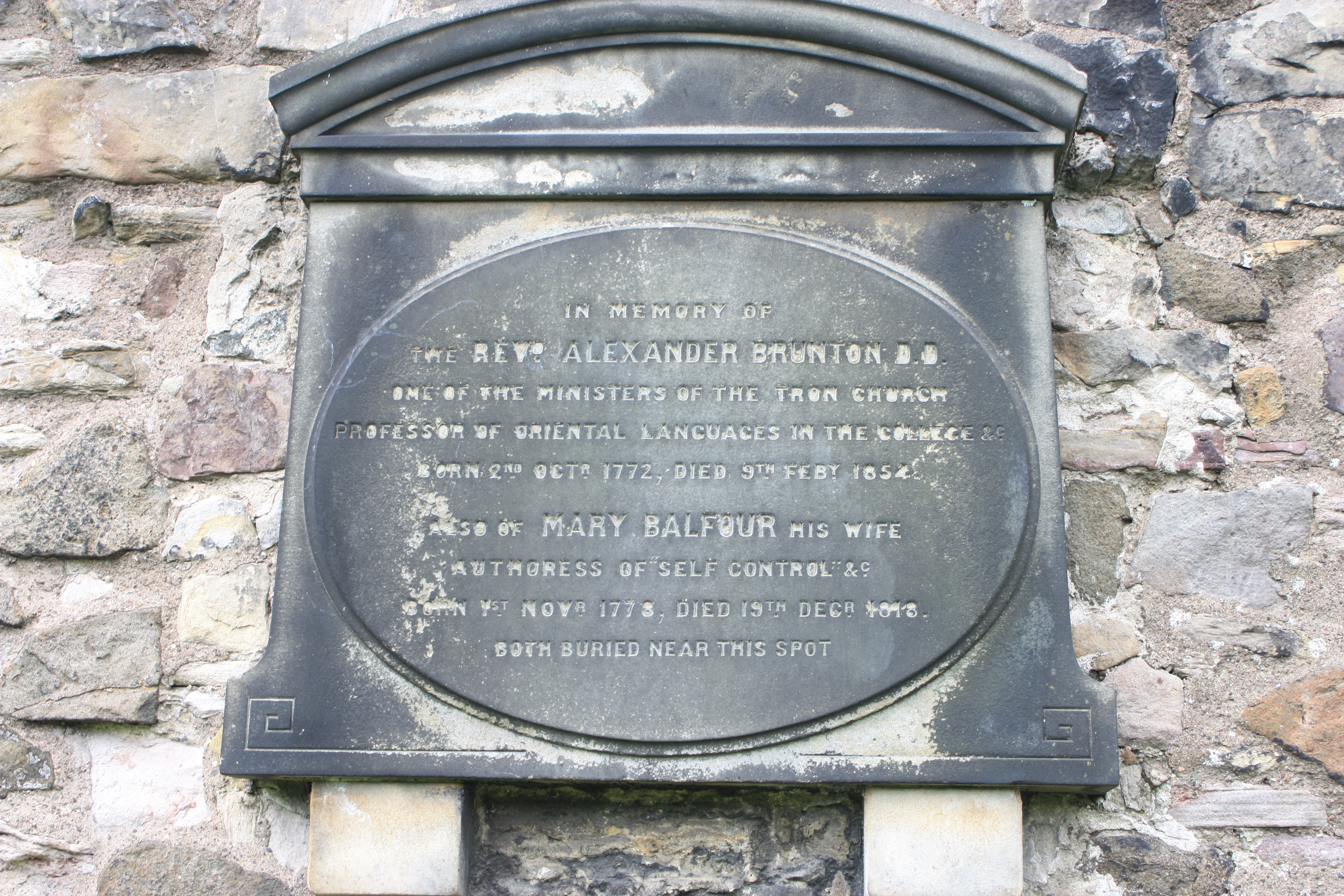
The grave of Brunton and his wife Mary Balfour, Canongate Kirkyard

Alexander Brunton FRSE FSA (2 October 1772 - 9 February 1854) was a Scottish minister in the Church of Scotland who rose to its highest rank, Moderator of the General Assembly in 1823. He was a noted academic, as Professor of Hebrew and Oriental Languages at the University of Edinburgh.

== Life ==
He was born on 2 October 1772 in Edinburgh the son of John Brunton a stay-maker living at the Bow Head. He was educated at the High School, Edinburgh. He had no formal university training but was licensed by the Presbytery of Linlithgow to preach for the Church of Scotland in 1796.

In 1797 he became minister of Bolton, East Lothian east of Edinburgh. In 1803 he was translated to New Greyfriars back in Edinburgh. In 1809 he moved to the Tron Kirk on the Royal Mile in Edinburgh in replacement of Rev Andrew Hunter of Barjarg.

In 1813 he was made Professor of Hebrew and Oriental Languages at the University of Edinburgh serving in this role until 1847. The University appointed him University Librarian in 1822 and he served in this role until death. He was awarded an honorary Doctor of Divinity (DD) by the University in December 1814.

He was elected a Fellow of the Royal Society of Edinburgh in 1814. His proposers were George Dunbar, Macvey Napier, Rev David Ritchie and Alexander Christison.

In 1814 he is noted as sitting on the Committee of the Caledonian Horticultural Society, alongside Francis Jeffrey, Lord Jeffrey and Henry Cockburn, Lord Cockburn.

He was elected a member of the American Antiquarian Society in 1821. He was elected Moderator of the General Assembly in 1823. He was convenor of the Indian Mission Committee from that year. He retired in 1847 due to ill health. In his final years in Edinburgh (his wife being dead) he had lived in rooms at Old College.

He died in Coupar Angus on 9 February 1854. He is buried with Mary in the Canongate Kirkyard in edinburgh. The grave lies midway along the western boundary wall. His position at the Tron was filled by Rev Maxwell Nicholson.

== Family ==
In December 1798 he was married to the eminent author Mary Balfour.

In 1818 his wife Mary died during childbirth. The child was still-born. At this time they lived at 35 Albany Street in Edinburgh's New Town.

== Artistic recognition ==
Brunton was sketched shaking hands with the Rev John Hunter by John Kay.

His portrait by John Watson Gordon is held in the Scottish National Portrait Gallery.

== In fiction ==
Alexander Brunton features as a character in Sara Sheridan's novel, The Fair Botanists.

== Publications ==
- Extracts from the Books of the Old Testament (1814 plus later editions)
- Sermons and Lectures (1818)
- Memoir of Mrs Brunton (1819)
- Outlines of Persian Grammar (1822)
- Sermon Preached on the Death of Dr Inglis (1834)
- Outlines of a Speech for the Commission of an Assembly (1843)
- Forms for Public Worship in the Church of Scotland (1848)
