= William Lothian =

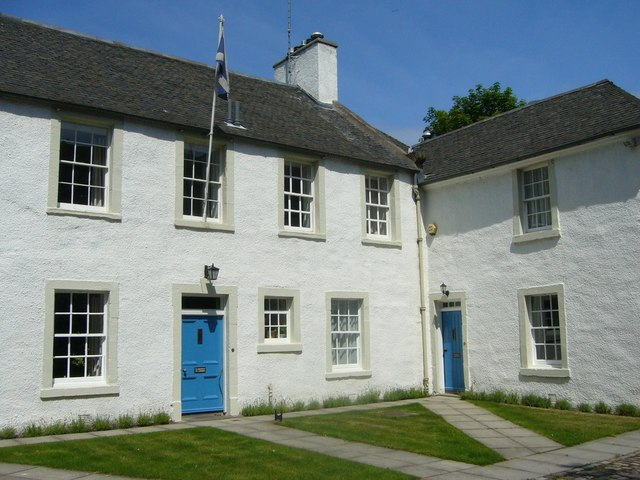
Lothian's house - Canongate Manse

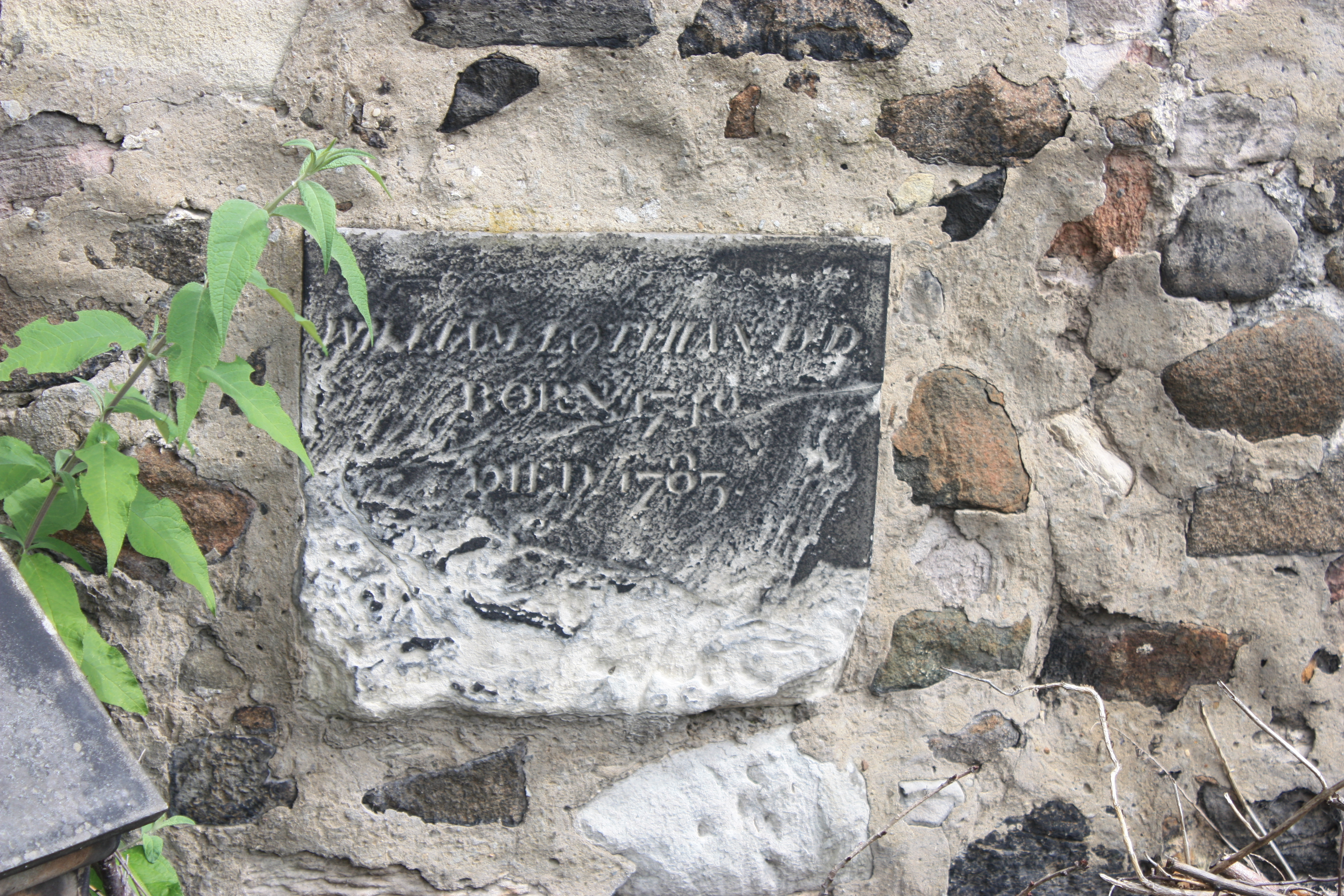
The grave of Rev William Lothian, Canongate Kirkyard

William Lothian FRSE (1740–1783) was a Scottish minister, author and joint founder of the Royal Society of Edinburgh.

== Life ==
He was born in Edinburgh on 5 November 1740 the son of Dr George Lothian (died 1746), a surgeon. He was educated at the High School in Edinburgh. He attended Edinburgh University studying divinity from 1755 and was licensed to preach in October 1762, aged only 21.

In 1764 he was appointed minister of Canongate Kirk on the Royal Mile and remained in that post until death.

In 1779 he received an honorary doctorate (DD) from Edinburgh University. On 17 November 1783 he was one of the joint founders of the Royal Society of Edinburgh. He died four weeks later on 17 December 1783, making him the first member to die. He is buried in Canongate Kirkyard next to his own church. The grave lies adjacent to the eastern doorway to the lower north section.

== Family ==
In 1766 he married a cousin, Elizabeth Lothian (died 1815) daughter of Edward Lothian an Edinburgh jeweller. They had five sons and one daughter: Edward Lothian WS (1769-1840), William (b. 1770), George Lothian (b. 1772) a merchant in Leith, John (1775-1779), Thomas Lothian (b. 1776) a surgeon, and Helen (b. 1773).

== Publications ==
- The Scotch Preacher (1776)
- The History of the United Provinces of the Netherlands (1780)
