= Canongate Kirk =

Church in Edinburgh, Scotland

Coordinates: 55.9519°N 3.1796°W

Kirk of the Canongate
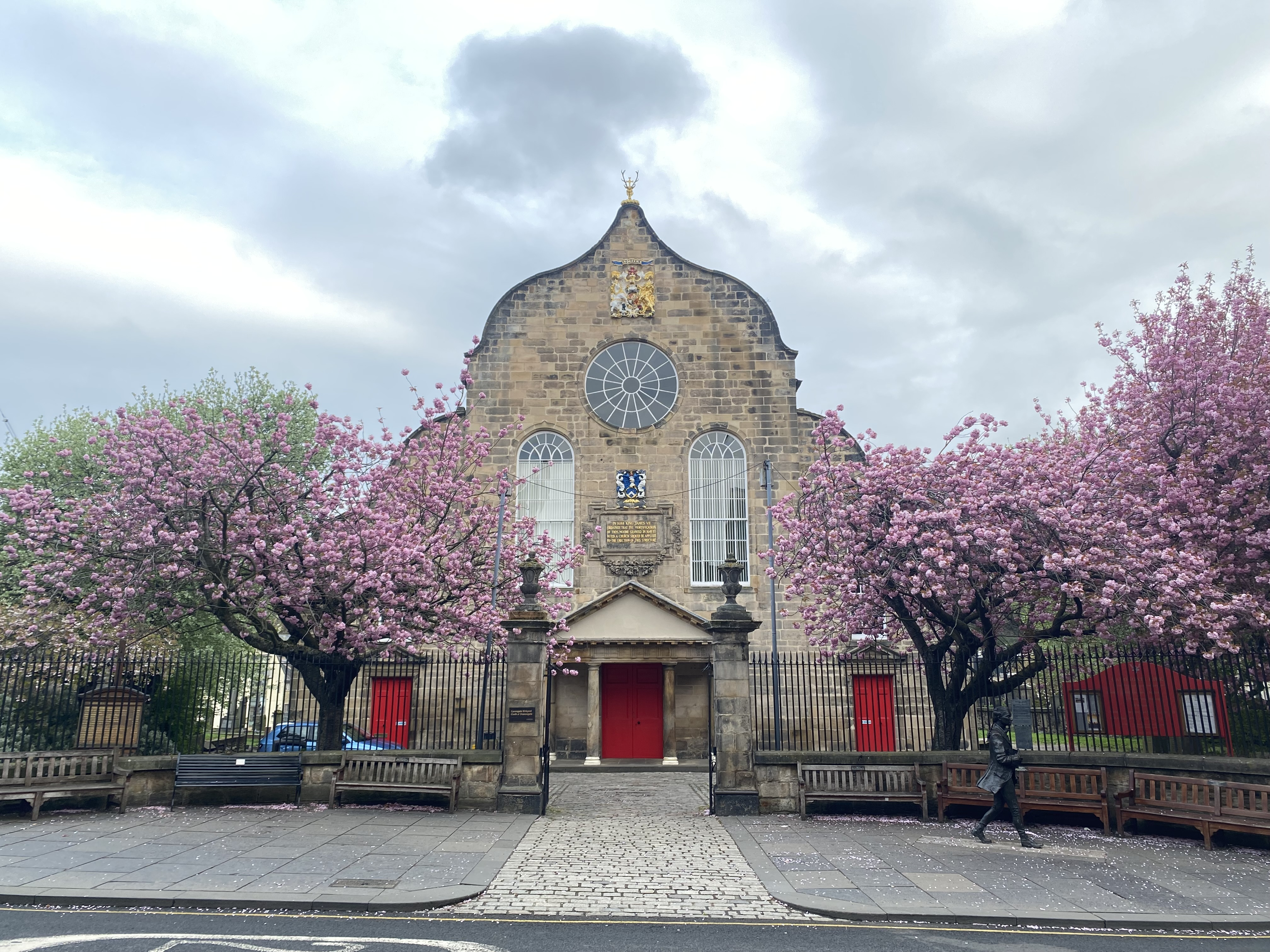
- Kirk of the Canongate
- Location: Canongate, Edinburgh
- Country: Scotland
- Denomination: Church of Scotland

History
- Status: Parish church

Architecture
- Functional status: Active
- Years built: 1688–1691

The Kirk of the Canongate, or Canongate Kirk, serves the Parish of Canongate in Edinburgh's Old Town, in Scotland. It is a congregation of the Church of Scotland. The parish includes the Palace of Holyroodhouse and the Scottish Parliament. It is also the parish church of Edinburgh Castle, even though the castle is detached from the rest of the parish. The wedding of Zara Phillips, the Queen's granddaughter, and former England rugby captain Mike Tindall took place at the church on 30 July 2011. The late Queen Elizabeth II used to attend services in the church on some of her frequent visits to Edinburgh.

== History ==
=== Background ===
After the Reformation the congregation of the Canongate continued to use Holyrood Abbey for worship. However, in September 1672 the Privy Council forbade its continuing use, such that the King might utilise the structure as a Chapel Royal. The congregation were instructed to use Lady Yester's Church while a new church was constructed.

=== Foundation ===
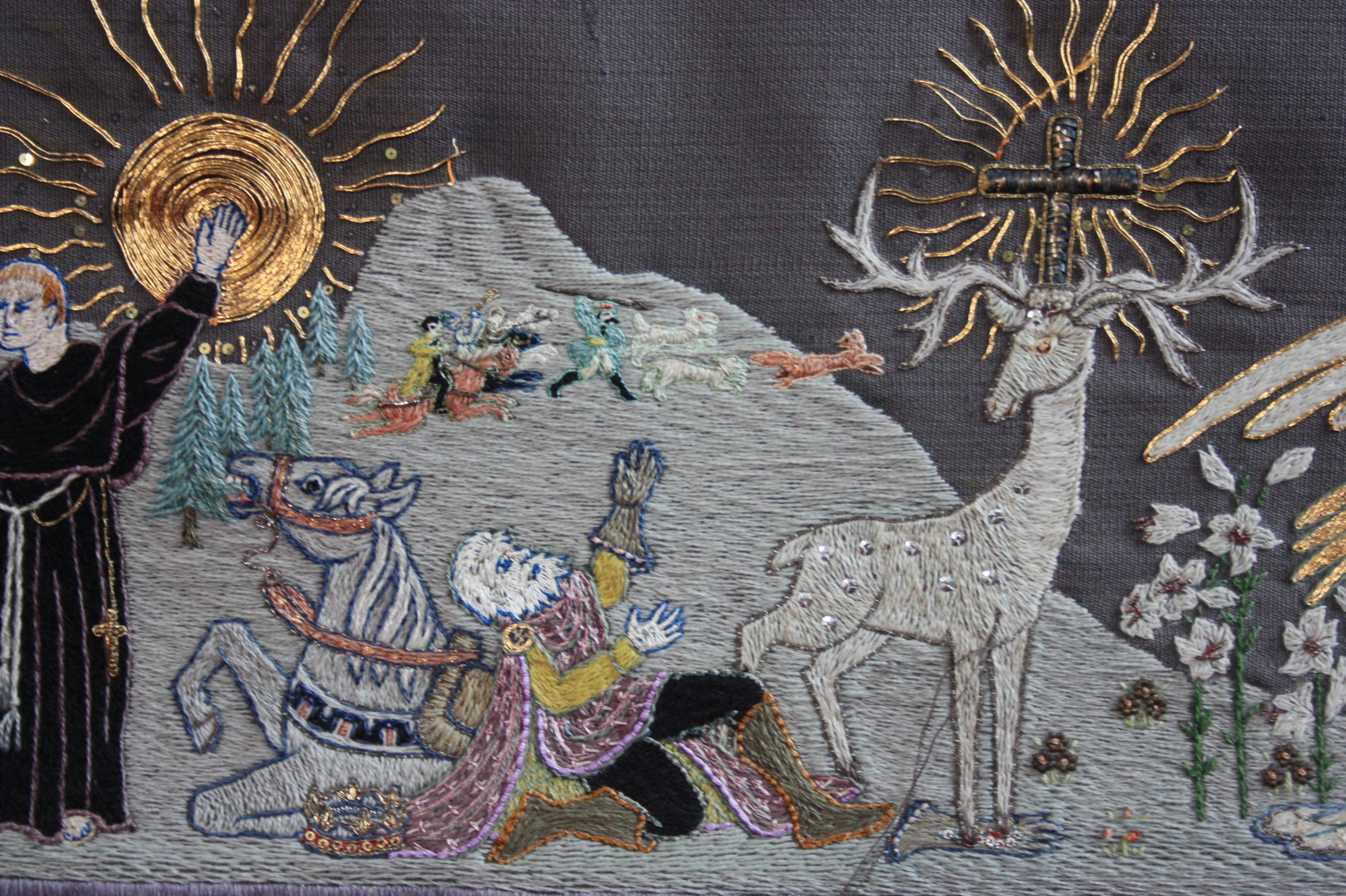
Detail of embroidery in Canongate Kirk explaining the origin of the church

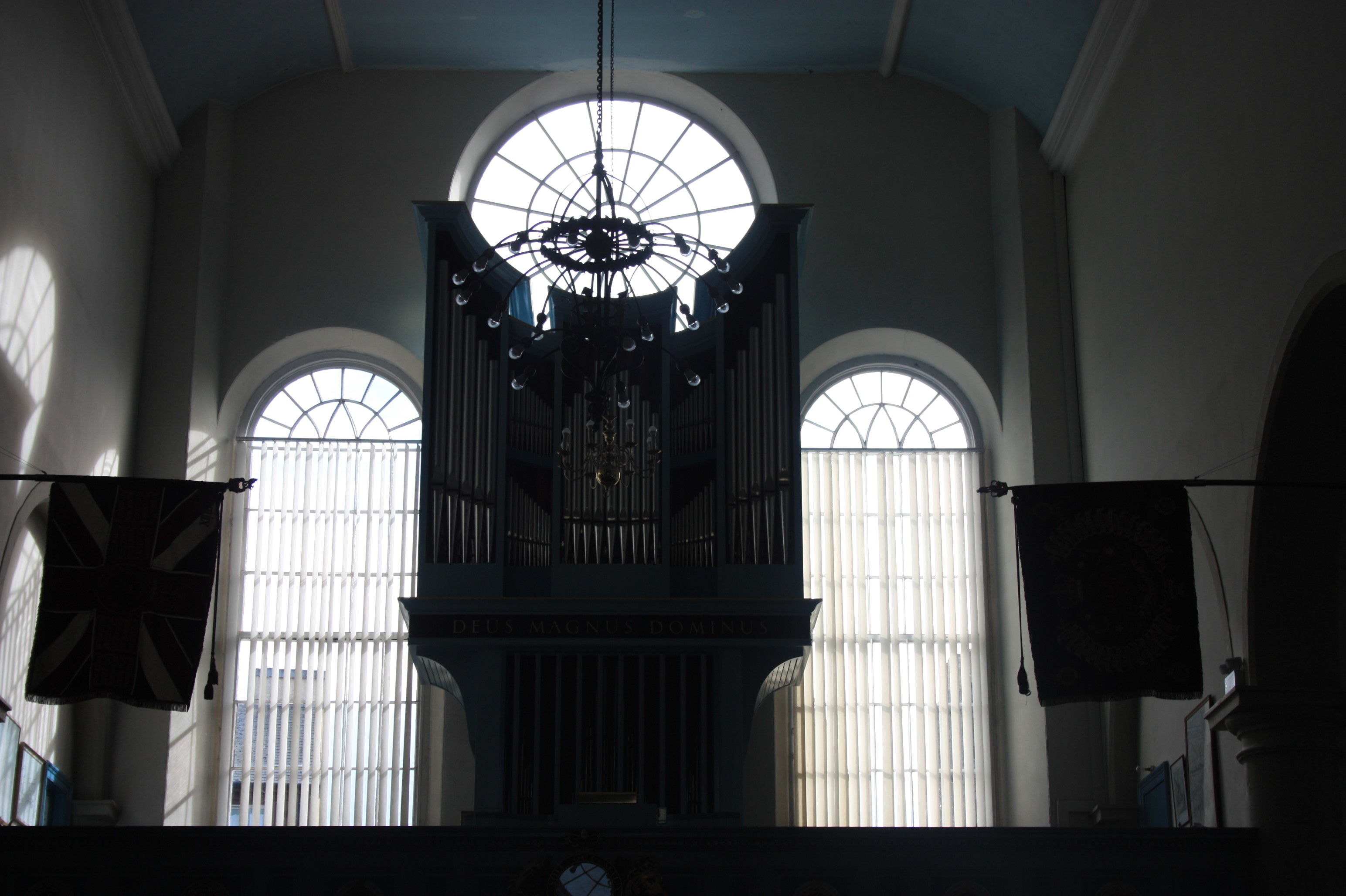
Interior, including organ, Canongate Kirk

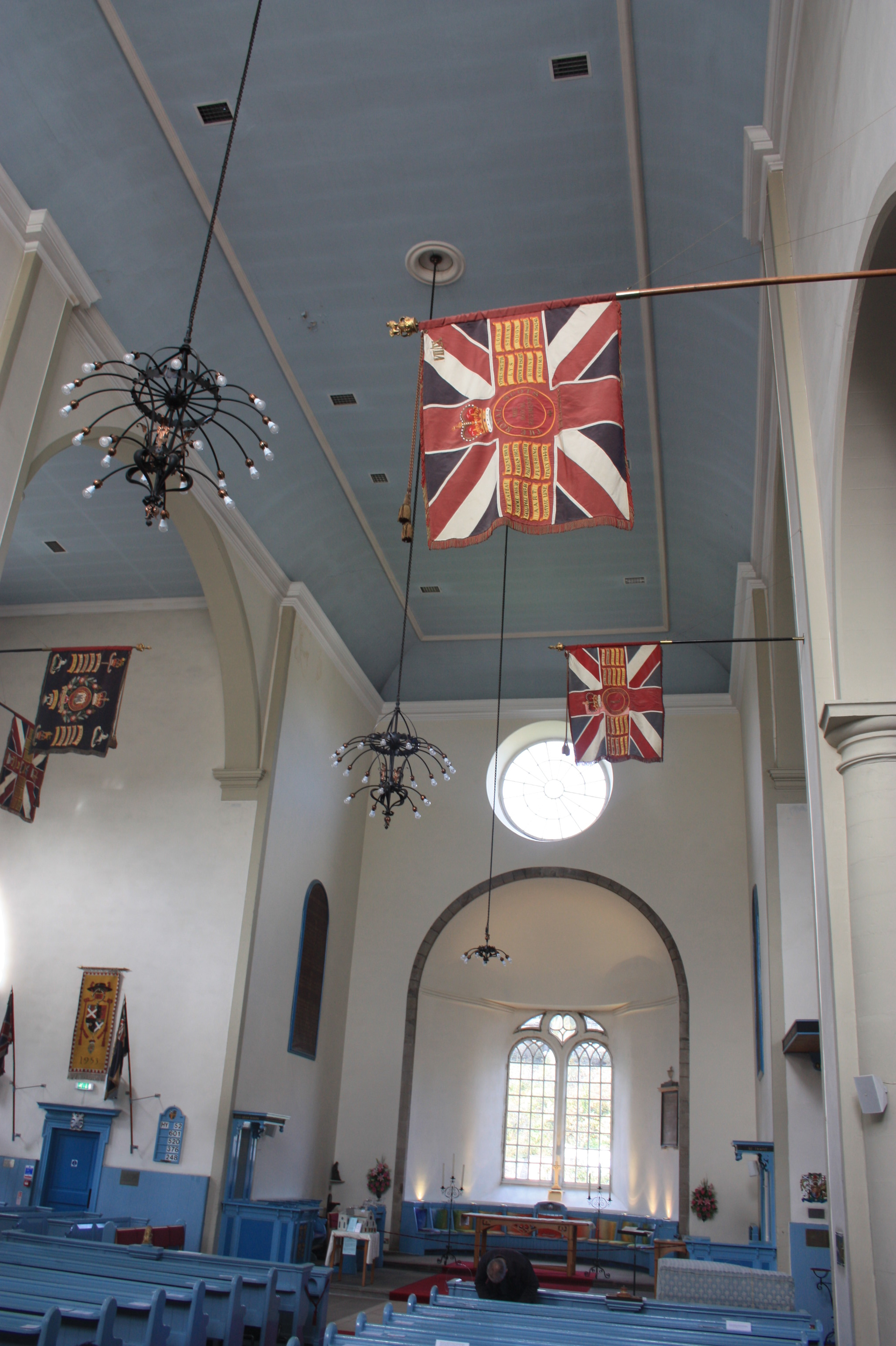
Church interior, Canongate Kirk

On 28 June 1687, James VII dispatched a letter from Windsor Castle to the Privy Council of Scotland with an order that Holyrood Abbey be repurposed as a Roman Catholic chapel for the newly founded Order of the Thistle. The repurposing of Holyrood Abbey necessitated the removal of the Church of Scotland congregation, who had used the nave of the abbey as a parish church since the Reformation. The Privy Council ordered the Town Council to hand over the keys of Holyrood Abbey and to accommodate the congregation in Lady Yester's until a new church could be built in the Canongate.

The parishioners successfully petitioned the King to divert a mortification of Thomas Moodie of Sachtenhall towards defraying the costs of construction. Moodie's arms now grace the facade of the church. Moodie, treasurer of Edinburgh and a Covenanter, had made an initial bequest of 20,000 merks in 1649 to construct a new church in the Grassmarket. The town council obtained permission to divert the money. Suggestions for its use included a peal of bells for St Giles', a tolbooth above the West Port, and a stipend for the minister of Lady Yester's. None of these proposals came to fruition and the mortification accumulated until John Paterson, bishop of Edinburgh procured a letter from the King ordering the mortification to be diverted towards constructing an episcopal palace and chapel. Yet, on 15 May 1688, the Earl of Perth, Lord Chancellor of Scotland presented the Privy Council with a letter from the King, informing them that money was to be diverted towards a church in the Canongate. A site was chosen at the north side of the Canongate and James Smith was engaged as architect. The congregation returned from Lady Yester's and occupied the new church from its completion in 1691. The cost of construction was estimated at 34,000 merks.

=== 18th century ===
In 1741, George Whitfield preached in the church at the invitation of James Walker, the minister of the first charge. In 1748, Whitfield preached twice in the Canongate Kirk, accompanied by Ralph Erskine. In 1745, during the ministry of Hugh Blair, the army of Charles Edward Stuart occupied Edinburgh and the Canongate. The session meetings were disrupted and the Jacobite army used the church to hold prisoners from the Battle of Prestonpans.

By the late 18th century, the church had become overcrowded and, in 1792, a chapel of ease was constructed in Leith Wynd. A further chapel of ease was constructed at the foot of New Street in 1792. The trade incorporations of the Canongate supported the construction and were rewarded with the right to nominate its minister.

=== 19th century ===
==== Decline ====
During the visit to Scotland of George IV, the commissioners to the General Assembly of the Church of Scotland met in the church before processing to meet the King at Holyroodhouse. Yet, during the 19th century, the church's connection with royalty appeared to be in decline. From the Reformation, the Crown served as one of the church's patrons; but this connection ceased shortly after the Canongate lost its status as a separate burgh in 1856. The Royal Almoner distributed alms to poor Highlanders in the church during the summer months; yet this tradition ceased during the early years of Queen Victoria's reign. The burgh council worshipped in the church each Midsummer; but this too had ceased by the early 20th century.

The church's loss of royal and civic status paralleled a decline in the status of its parish. By the early 19th century, the construction of the Regent and London Roads had diverted the main thoroughfare into Edinburgh away from the burgh and many inhabitants had moved to the New Town. and Walter Buchanan, minister from 1789 to 1832, described his parish thus:

"The stoutest heart may well be appalled in looking upon the dismal abounding of iniquity, the unveiled and unmitigated vileness, the black and disgusting crimes, which by day and by night deform the sinning myriads of a populous and polluted city,"

By the mid-19th century, migration of Roman Catholics from Ireland had further changed the character of the Canongate. The Canongate's minister between 1845 and 1867, Andrew R. Bonar, calculated that, in the parish, there were 411 families, of whom only 45 were attached to any Reformed communion, 70 were Roman Catholics, and 296 were unconnected with any church.

==== Revival ====
At the Disruption of 1843 the minister and almost all of the congregation of the Canongate Kirk remained within the established church. The minister and most of the congregation of the Leith Wynd Chapel, which had been erected a parish quoad sacra in 1834, joined the Free Church and the chapel closed. The New Street chapel was erected a parish quoad sacra in 1867 but no minister was appointed and the church was abolished in 1884.

Andrew R. Bonar was presented to the first charge in 1849. Alongside John Marshall Lang and Robert Lee, he was a leader of the liturgical revival in 19th-century Scottish Presbyterianism. Bonar introduced hymn-singing and a choir to the Canongate Kirk; a pipe organ, one of the first in the Church of Scotland, was introduced in 1874. In 1863, fire damaged the church and probably destroyed the Canongate records, which had been organised and bound during the ministry of John Lee.

When James McNair arrived as minister in minister in 1869, the church claimed 500 members and 200 communicants in a parish of 10 thousand. McNair oversaw a revival in the church's fortunes: four years after his arrival, membership had doubled and the number of communications had more than trebled. At the session's request, the American evangelists, Ira D. Sankey and Dwight L. Moody, held a series of meetings in the church during their 1874 visit to Scotland. Despite the protests of the Canongate's session, the area of the parish was reduced in 1882, when the Old Kirk congregation, who had vacated St Giles' in 1869, erected a new church at the foot of St John Street. The Old Kirk congregation was transported to Pilton in 1940 and the historic parish of the Canongate was restored.

=== 20th and 21st centuries ===
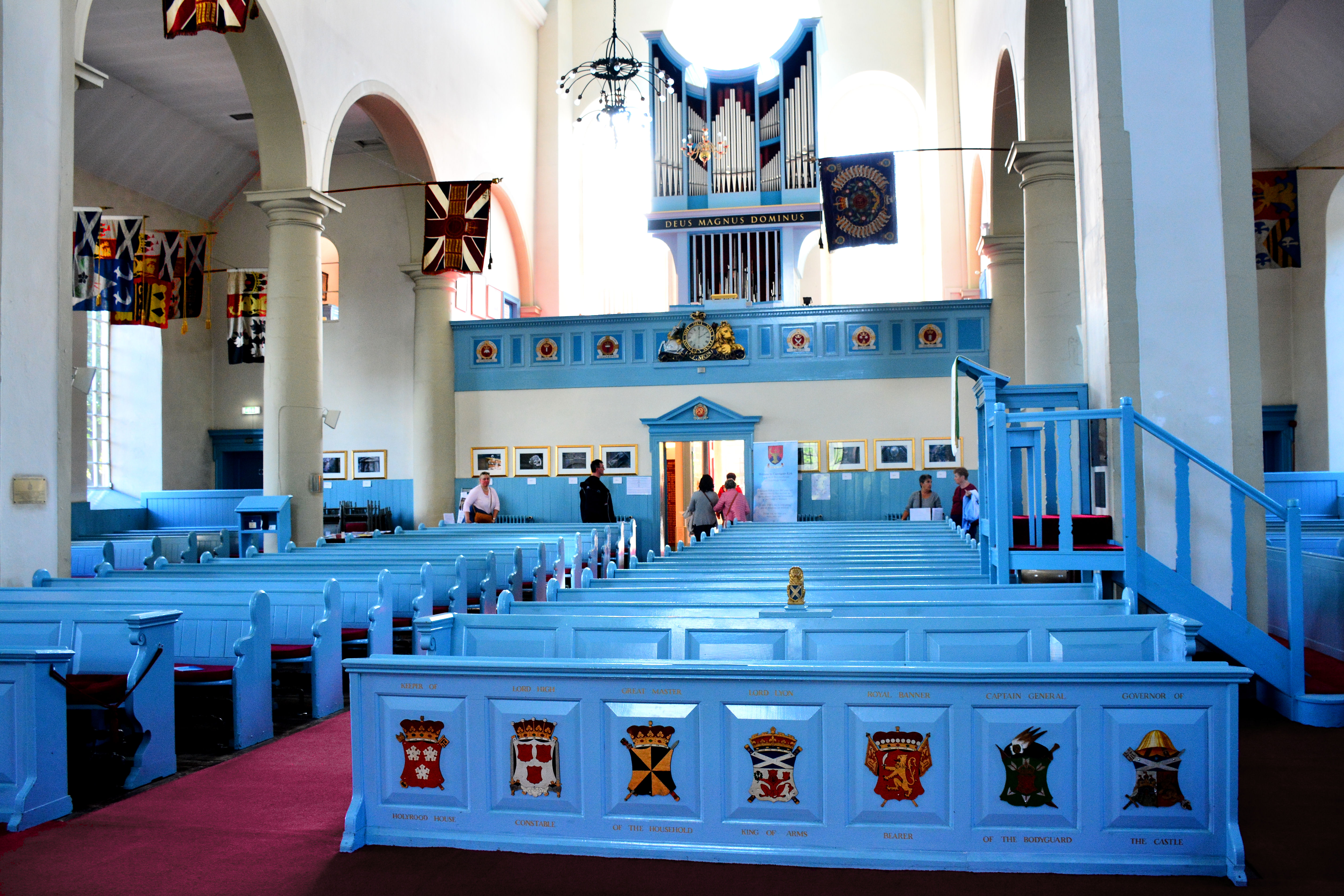
Canongate Kirk pews

McNair died in 1888 and was succeeded the following year by Thomas White, who ministered in the Canongate until his demission in 1936. White's ministry encompassed the First World War, during which, every available man on the Canongate signed up and 90 members of the congregation lost their lives.

White died shortly after his demission and was succeeded by Ronald Selby Wright in 1937. The same year, George VI gave the church a Christmas tree from Balmoral: the monarch has given a Christmas tree to the Canongate Kirk every year since. At the church's 250th anniversary in 1938, Wright announced plans to renovate the church. These plans were interrupted by the Second World War. During the War, Wright served as a military chaplain. Locum ministers and their assistants were provided from the Iona Community by George MacLeod, who set up a mainland headquarters for the community in the Canongate manse. Forty members of the congregation died during the war.

The interior renovation began in 1947 with the visit of Queen Elizabeth and Princess Margaret on 17 July. Although the church had always had a royal pew, this was the first ever visit by royalty to the church. This royal connection was cemented on 25 June 1952, when the Queen visited the church during her first visit to Scotland as monarch. This was the first ever visit to the church by a reigning monarch and the Queen and other senior royals have since paid regular visits to the church for worship. On 30 July 2011, the church hosted the wedding of the Queen's granddaughter, Zara Phillips to Mike Tindall.

At the turn of the 20th century, Grey Graham had described the Canongate as "the centre of dirt and poverty and squalor". Yet, from the 1950s, the area was sympathetically redeveloped, culminating in the opening of the Scottish Parliament Building in 2004; the presence of the University of Edinburgh in the area also increased. The church responded with the opening of Russell House in 1964 as student residences and the opening of Harry Younger Hall as a hall and gymnasium in 1967.

== Building and kirkyard ==
Architecturally, the Kirk has a Dutch-style end gable and a curious, small doric-columned portico over the entrance. The end gable is topped with a golden cross inside a pair of antlers, the now obsolete coat of arms of the Canongate, first placed on the apex of the roof in 1824 and replaced by those from a stag shot at Balmoral by King George VI in 1949. The Kirk's interior has a cruciform layout (highly unusual for a post-Reformation, pre-Victorian Church of Scotland building). The Kirk's interior was extensively remodelled in 1882, with the inclusion of a pipe organ and a central pulpit. These unsympathetic alterations were removed in the early 1950s, along with the galleries. The resulting reordering considerably increased the levels of light; the original dignified simplicity of the Kirk was able to be appreciated once more. The Kirk was further restored in 1991 by the Stewart Todd partnership, followed by the installation of a new Danish-built Frobenius pipe organ in 1998, in memory of the late Very Rev Dr Ronald Selby Wright. This was the 1000th organ to be built by the Frobenius company.

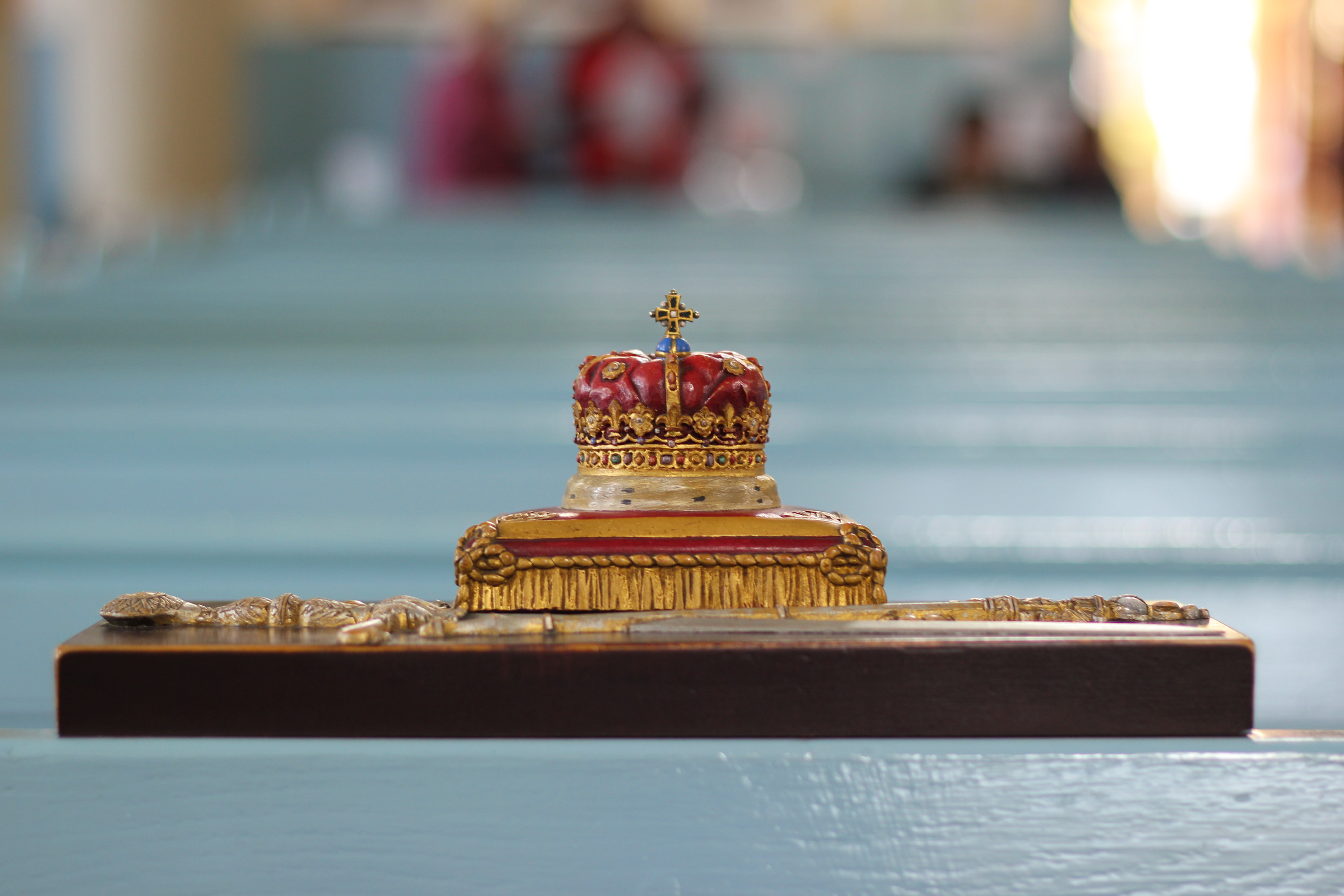
The Royal Pew inside the kirk

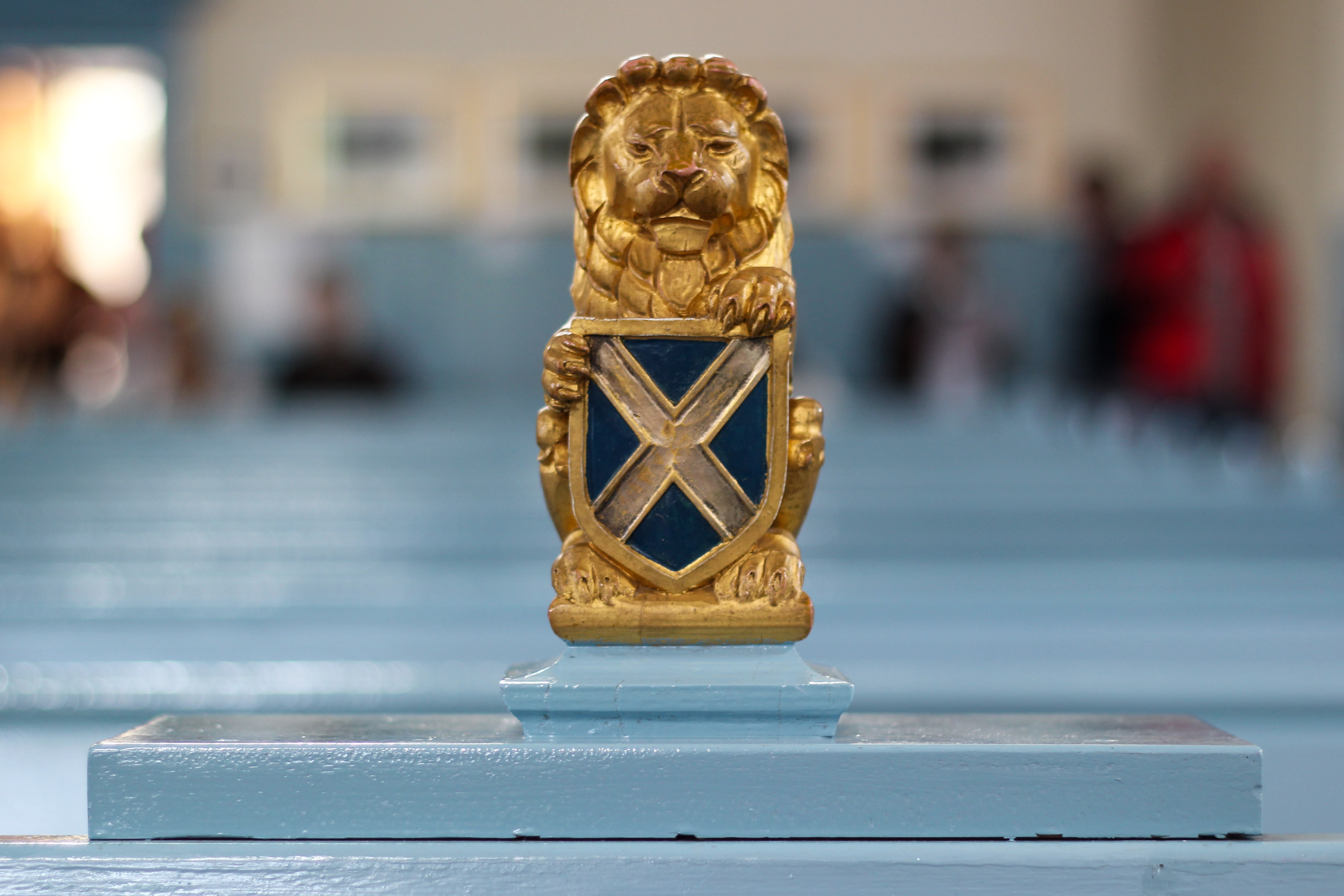
The Castle Pew inside the kirk

A Royal Pew, as well as a Castle Pew, can be found in the front row of the church.

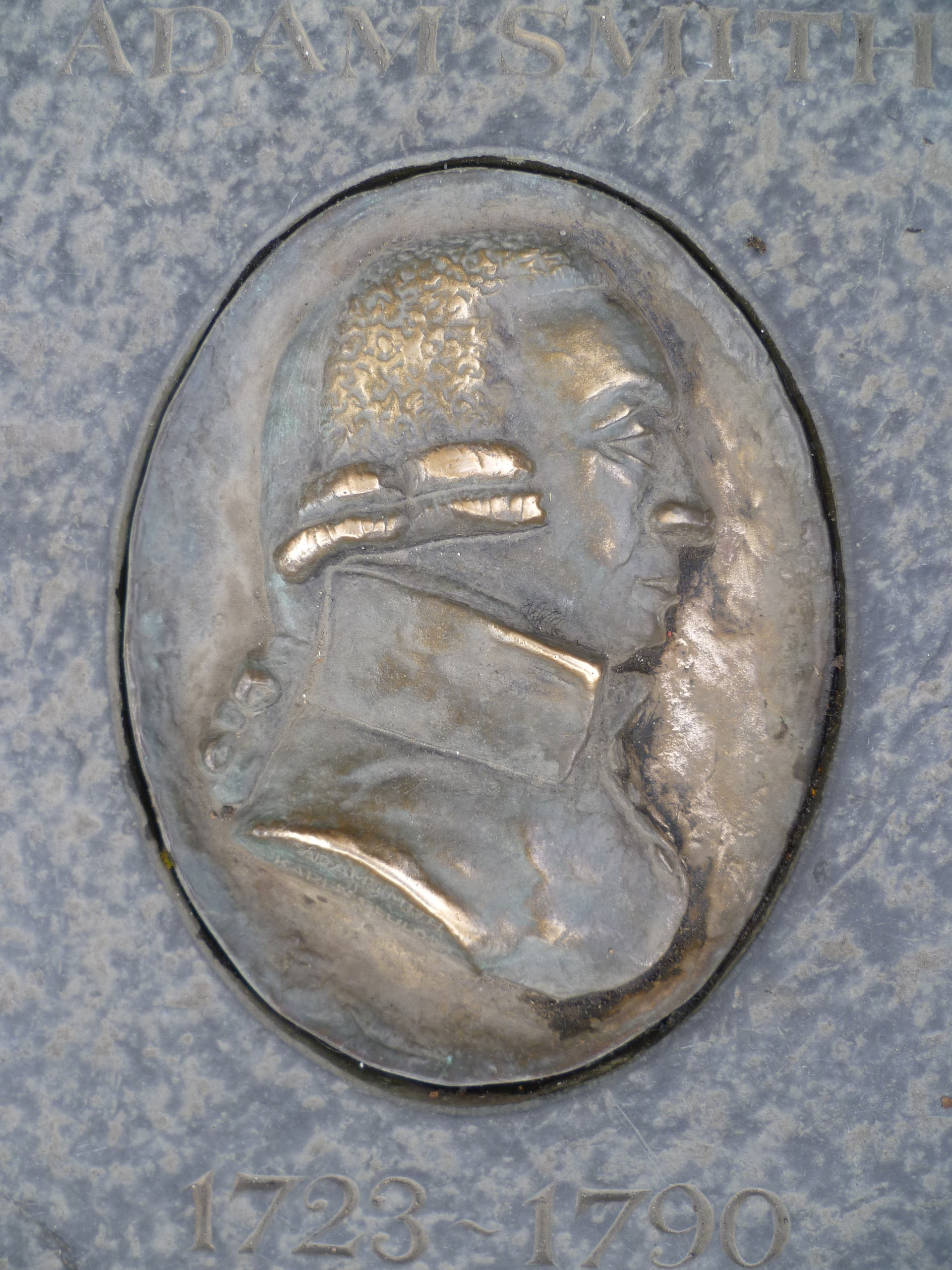
Adam Smith button

The Canongate Churchyard is the resting place of several Edinburgh notables including the economist Adam Smith, the philosopher and Smith's biographer Dugald Stewart, Agnes Maclehose (the "Clarinda" of Robert Burns), by tradition David Rizzio, the murdered private secretary of Mary, Queen of Scots, and the poet Robert Fergusson, whose statue in bronze by David Annand stands outside the kirk gate. Bishop James Ramsay is also buried here.

== Current work ==
The Kirk has an active congregation, with a service each Sunday morning at 10:30 plus a monthly evening service. This service lasts just under an hour and follows a set liturgy. The Sacrament of Holy Communion is usually celebrated on the last Sunday of the month during the service. The building is also regularly used for concerts. During the annual Edinburgh Festival, the Kirk is extensively used as a venue for music (Venue 60), as is the Kirk's nearby hall – the "Harry Younger Hall" (which is known as "Venue 13" for the duration of the annual Edinburgh Festival Fringe; The Kirk was previously the regimental chapel of The Royal Scots Regiment of the British Army and is now the regimental chapel of The Royal Regiment of Scotland.

== Ministry ==
Canongate Kirk has been served by several well-known former ministers, two having also served as Moderator of the General Assembly of the Church of Scotland. Very Rev Thomas Wilkie (1645–1711) was the first minister of the Kirk and was twice Moderator – in 1701 and 1704. A long family tradition started in the 18th century with three generations of minister taking the ministry, all Rev. John Warden the family changed its name to Macfarlan in the later 18th century following a marriage. The most notable, Rev John Warden (Macfarlan) (1740–1788) was minister 1762 to 1788 and co-founded the Royal Society of Edinburgh in 1783.

Rev Hugh Blair was second charge from 1743 to 1753.

During these early years ministries were shared due to demand. Concurrently with Rev John Warden (from 1764 to 1783) Rev William Lothian DD (1740–1783) was First Charge. The Rev. Robert Walker was minister from 1784 to 1808. He campaigned to end the slave trade and is famous for the painting by Henry Raeburn The Skating Minister which shows Walker skating on Duddingston loch.

The Very Reverend Dr Ronald Selby Wright, known as the "Radio Padre" for his famous wartime broadcasts, was minister from 1937 until 1977 and served as Moderator in 1972. Whilst Dr Selby Wright was away on wartime service as an Army Chaplain, the Revd George MacLeod (later the Very Revd Lord MacLeod of Fuinary, founder of the Iona Community and Moderator in 1957) served as locum. Dr Selby Wright was succeeded as minister by the Reverend Charles Robertson LVO MA, who retired in 2005.

The current minister (since 22 June 2006) is the Reverend Neil N. Gardner MA BD (who was previously minister at Alyth and an Army Chaplain in the Black Watch Regiment). The organist and Director of Music is Simon Leach FISM GMusRNCM . The Kirk Secretary and Events Administrator is Imogen Gibson who works from the Manse office.

Other notable ministers were Rev John Warden (1709–1764), his son, Rev John Warden of Balancleroch FRSE (1740–1788), a joint founder of the Royal Society of Edinburgh, and his grandson Rev John Warden of Kirkton (1767–1846). The family changed their surname to McFarlan in 1767. A remarkable three generations in the same role.

=== Succession since Reformation ===
- 1561 to 1564 – John Craig
- 1564 to 1600 – John Brand, formerly Canon Brand of Holyrood Abbey therefore a familiar face to the congregation
- 1601 to 1622 – Henry Blyth MA
- 1621 to 1623 – Robert Seymour
- 1624 to 1635 – James Hannay
- 1635 to 1645 – Matthew Wemyss (1603–1645)
- 1646 to 1656 – George Leslie MA (d.1656) buried in the "Easter Kirk of Holyrood" on the Canongate
- 1657 to 1662 – James Nairne MA
- 1663 to 1673 – James Kid MA
- 1673 to 1676 – James Inglis MA
- 1676 -to 1685? – Robert Scott
- 1687 to 1689 – Robert Burnet, second charge from 1685
- 1689 to 1711 – Thomas Wilkie, Moderator in 1701 and 1704
- 1713 to 1752 – James Walker MA
- 1753 to 1763 – James Watson
- 1764 to 1783 – William Lothian DD
- 1784 to 1808 – Robert Walker
- 1808 to 1810 – Andrew Grant DD
- 1811 to 1820 – Henry Garnock
- 1830 to 1821 – Alexander Stewart
- 1823 to 1825 – Rev Prof John Lee DD LLD
- 1825 to 1849 – John Gilchrist DD
- 1849 to 1867 – Andrew Redman Bonar (1818–1867) a cousin to Andrew Bonar
- 1867 to 1869 – Daniel McFee (1811–1899)
- 1869 to 1888 – James MacNair
- 1889 to 1936 – Thomas White
- 1937 to 1977 – Ronald Selby Wright

=== Second Charge ===
From 1592 to 1867 Canongate was populous enough to merit a "second charge" who would give a later service within the same church: notable second charge ministers were:

- 1592 to 1595 – John Davidson MA
- 1595 to 1601 – Henry Blyth MA moved to first charge
- 1611 to 1615 – Oliver Colt MA
- 1630 to 1635 – Matthew Wemyss, moved to first charge
- 1636 to 1639 – John Watson MA
- 1639 to 1646 – George Leslie MA moved to first charge
- 1646 to 1653 – John Hog MA translated to South Leith Parish Church
- 1656 to 1657 – James Nairne moved to first charge
- 1658 to 1673 – Alexander Hutchison
- 1663 to 1680 – Patrick Hepburn, translated to St Cuthberts Church
- 1680 to 1681 – Archibald Calderwood
- 1682 to 1685 – John Lumsden
- 1685 to 1687 – Alexander Burnet, translated yo first charge
- 1687 to 1694 – James Craig MA, translated to Duddingston Kirk
- 1695 to 1708 – William Mitchell later 5 times Moderator
- 1709 to 1741 – John Walker
- 1743 to 1754 – Hugh Blair (see above)
- 1755 to 1764 – John Warden MA
- 1765 to 1788 – John Warden jr aka John Warden MacFarlan
- 1789 to 1832 – Walter Buchanan DD
- 1833 to 1844 – John Clark MA
- 1845 to 1848 – Andrew Redman Bonar, translated to first charge
- 1850 to 1867 – Daniel McFee moved to first charge on death of A R Bonar

== See also ==
- Canongate Kirkyard
- Church of Scotland
- List of Church of Scotland parishes
- The Skating Minister

== Bibliography ==
- Drummond, Andrew Landale (1934). The Church Architecture of Protestantism. T. & T. Clark
- Dunlop, A. Ian (1988). The Kirks of Edinburgh: 1560–1984. Scottish Record Society. ISBN 0-902054-10-4
- Gifford, John; McWilliam, Colin; Walker, David (1984). The Buildings of Scotland: Edinburgh. Penguin Books. ISBN 0-14-071068-X
- Gray, William Forbes (1940). Historic Edinburgh Churches. The Moray Press.
- Hay, George (1957). The Architecture of Scottish Post-Reformation Churches: 1560 to 1843. Oxford University Press.
- Scott, Hew (1915). Fasti ecclesiae scoticanae; the succession of ministers in the Church of Scotland from the reformation. Vol. 1. Edinburgh: Oliver and Boyd.
- Royal Commission on the Ancient and Historical Monuments of Scotland (1951). An Inventory of the Ancient and Historical Monuments of the City of Edinburgh with the Thirteenth Report of the Commission. His Majesty's Stationery Office.
- Wright, Ronald Selby (1956). The Kirk in the Canongate. Oliver and Boyd.
