= Canongate Kirkyard =

Cemetery in City of Edinburgh, Scotland

Coordinates: 55.9523°N 3.1798°W

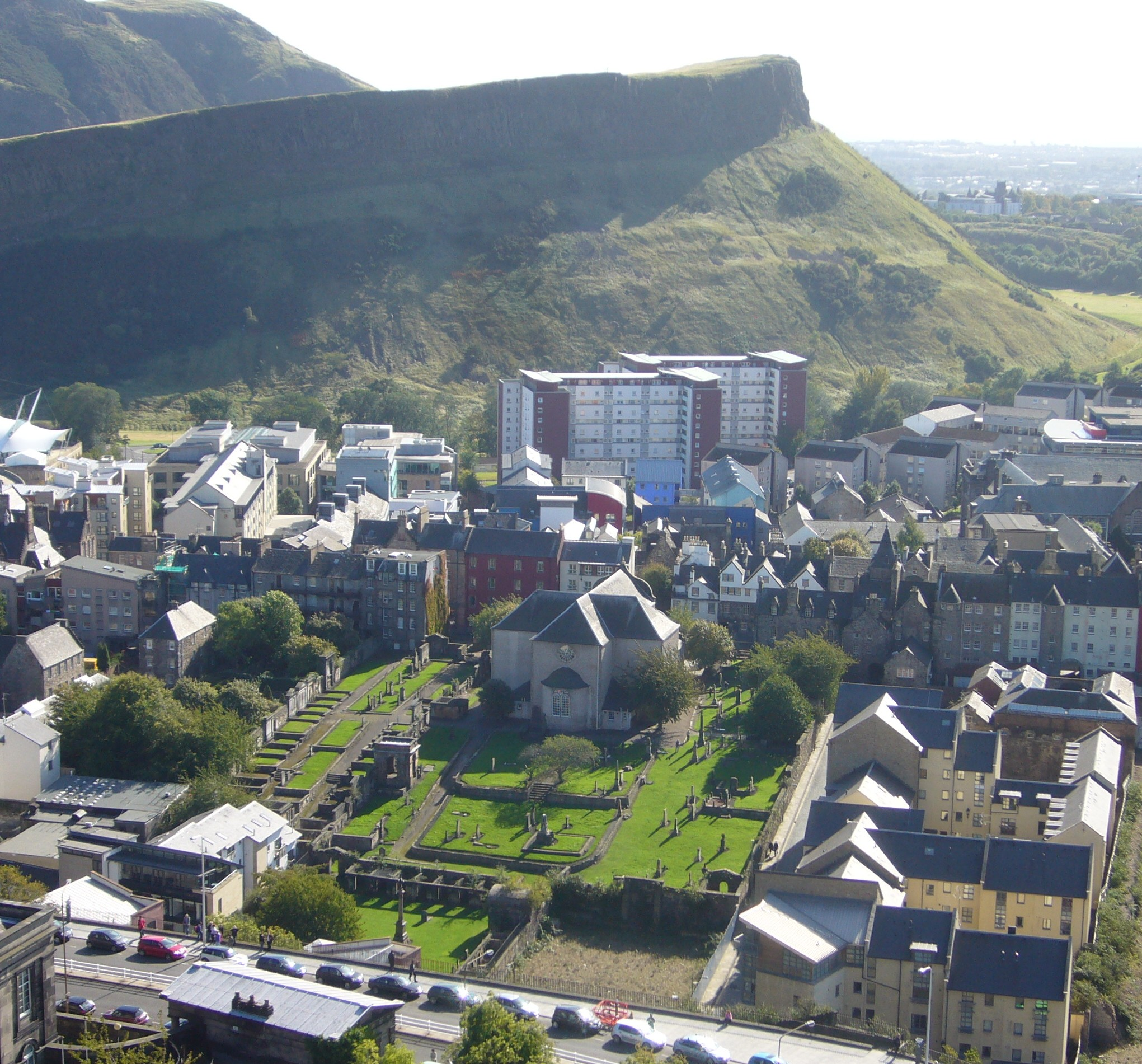
Canongate Kirk, seen from Calton Hill, with the churchyard in the foreground, and Salisbury Crags behind

The Canongate Kirkyard (English: Churchyard) stands around Canongate Kirk on the Royal Mile in Edinburgh, Scotland. The churchyard was used for burials from the late 1680s until the mid-20th century.

The most celebrated burials at the kirkyard are the economist Adam Smith and the poet Robert Fergusson, but many other notable people were interred in the cemetery. It has been claimed that David Rizzio, the murdered private secretary of Mary, Queen of Scots, lies here, although it is highly unlikely that an Italian Catholic would be reinterred in a Protestant graveyard 120 years after his death.

== History ==
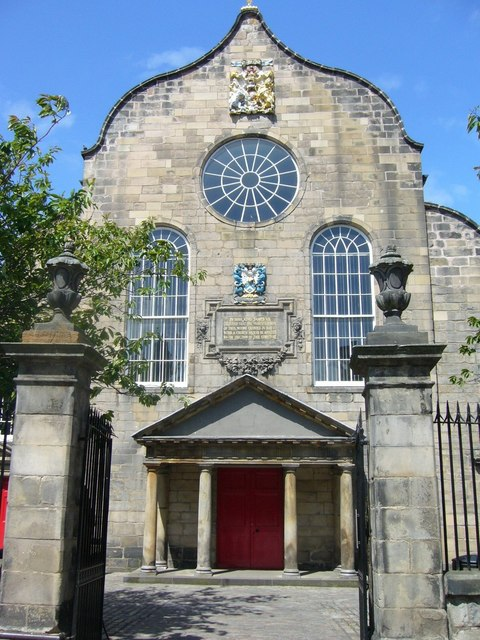
The Canongate Kirk

The Canongate was, until the 19th century, a separate parish from Edinburgh. This separate parish was formerly served by Holyrood Abbey at the foot of the Royal Mile, and Lady Yester's Church on High School Wynd. In 1687 King James VII adopted the abbey church as a Royal Chapel, and the general population worshipped in Lady Yester's Kirk (built in 1647) until 1691. Both of these sites formerly served as burial grounds to the parish.

The new Canongate Kirk was founded in 1688 and completed in 1691. A large area of ground was purchased beyond that required for the erection of the church, and this appears to have been used for burial immediately from the church's foundation in 1688. This area is now fully occupied as a burial ground.

Due to peculiarities in the parish boundaries, the parish also included some properties on the Nor Loch and, due to an ancient charter linking the castle to Holyrood, also Edinburgh Castle, which saw itself as separate from the parish of Edinburgh, under St Giles'. This led to many burials of soldiers from the castle within the section to the north of the churchyard.

In 1952 the old Church Hall to the east, facing the Canongate, was demolished. This area was reformed as a sunken garden and the Burgh Cross, dating from 1128, was relocated here as a centre-piece, having formerly stood in the roadway in front of the church. The cross was restored in 1888, when it was moved from its temporary home in front of the Canongate Tolbooth to in front of the church, before its transition to the sunken garden in 1953.

The Canongate Kirkyard has been calculated to have 62 tombs, 140 monuments and 150 wall plaques, ledgers, etc.

== Monuments and burials of interest ==
=== 18th-century burials ===
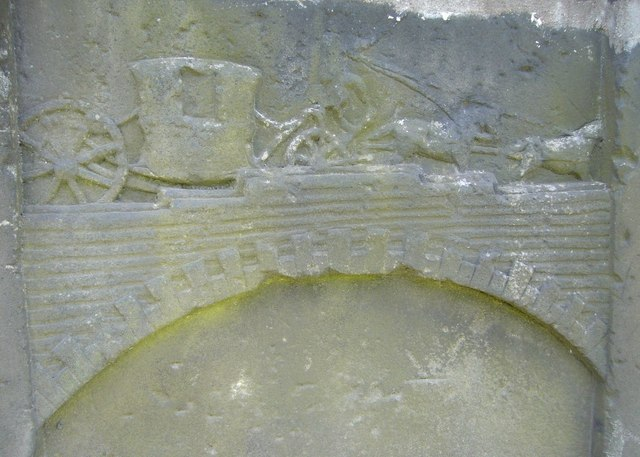
The Coachman's Stone

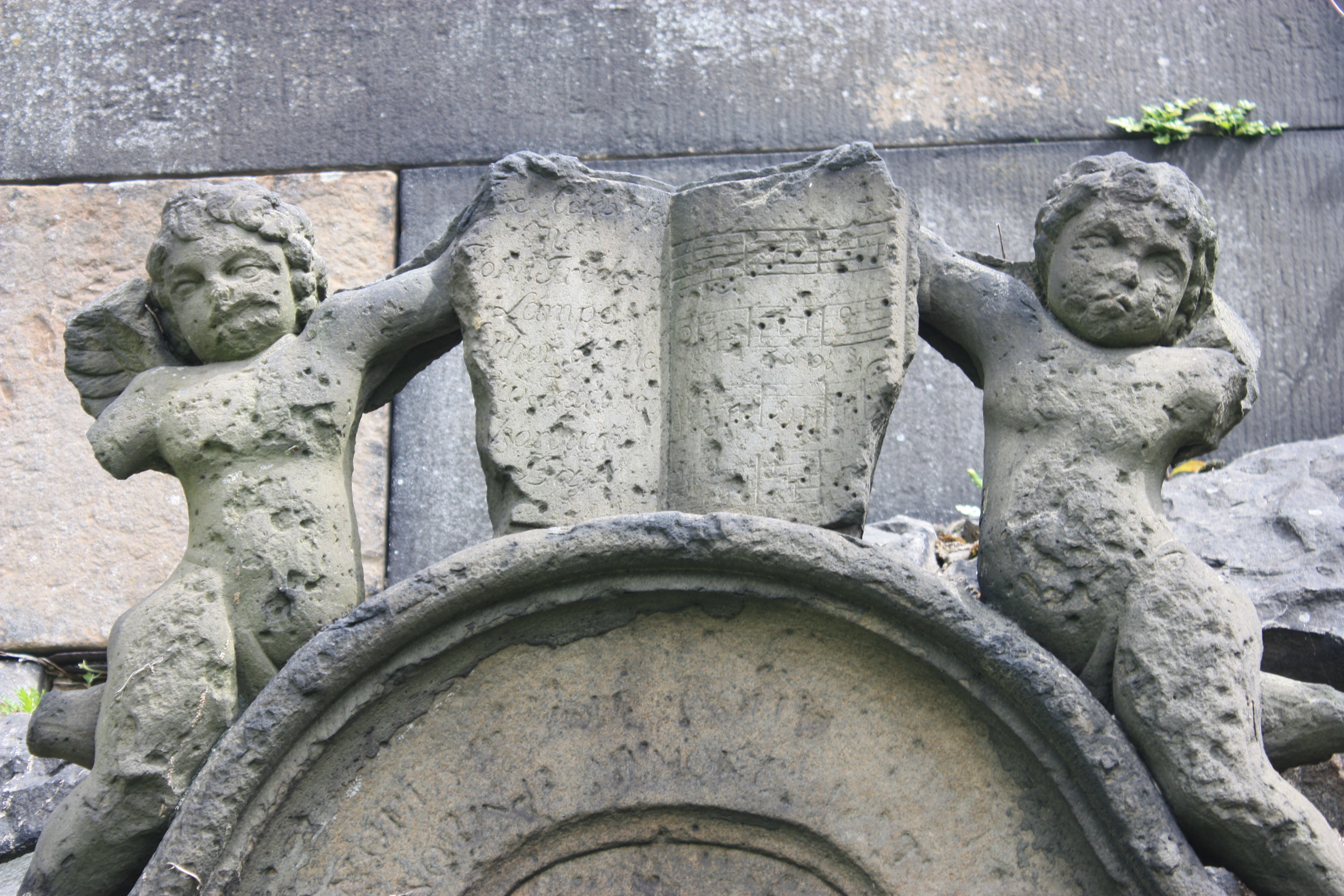
Detail from the grave of John Frederick Lampe, Canongate Kirkyard

Very Rev Thomas Wilkie (1645–1711) first minister of Canongate Kirk and twice Moderator of the General Assembly of the Church of Scotland.

James Campbell of Tofts (1684–c. 1750) landowner.

The Coachman's Stone, dating to around 1770, displays a skull and the motto "memento mori". It is inscribed "This stone is for the society of Coachdrivers In the Canongate It was chiefly erected by Thomas Jamieson and Robert Maving, treasurer, 1734–65". Below this inscription is a relief sculpture of a coach and horses crossing a bridge. The drivers operated the Edinburgh to London route from White Horse Close, around 200 metres (660 ft) to the east. Several of the Company are interred at this spot.

John Frederick Lampe (1703–1751) was a composer, conductor and writer of hymn-tunes for Charles Wesley and others. His stone, just to the north of the Fettes tomb, is now badly eroded and for the most part illegible. At the base of the stone is a skull and two crossed bones, and at the top two figures hold a small book with some of his composition inscribed. The stone formerly read:

"Here lye the mortal remains of John Frederick Lampe whose harmonious composing shal out live Monumental register"

Bishop Robert Keith (1681–1757) authored A History of the Church and State in Scotland from the Reformation to 1568.

Sir Thomas Calder (1682–1760), stone erected by his grandson Admiral Robert Calder.

Professor Charles Alston (1683–1760), lecturer in Botany and Medicinal Plants at Edinburgh University, was co-founder of the Edinburgh School of Medicine in 1726.

George Drummond (1688–1766) was six times Lord Provost of Edinburgh, and the founder of Edinburgh New Town. He was responsible for the redevelopment of Edinburgh, founding the Edinburgh Royal Infirmary; co-founding the Medical School; draining the Nor’ Loch; founding the Royal Exchange in 1753; and most importantly, initiating and founding the New Town and the first North Bridge (1763).

John Gregory MD (1724–1773) and his son James Gregory MD (1753–1821) were from a long line of Gregorys from Aberdeen, eminent in both medicine and science. John was Professor of Medicine in Aberdeen from 1755 to 1766, and at Edinburgh University from 1766 until his death. James was a doctor and publisher, who succeeded his father in the chair of Medicine at Edinburgh University in 1776, and also had a separate chair in the Practice of Medicine from 1790. He was the inventor of "Gregory's Powder" a mixture of magnesia, rhubarb and ginger, used in the treatment of stomach complaints for around 150 years. His son Dr James Gregory and grandsons Donald Gregory and James Crawford Gregory lie nearby.

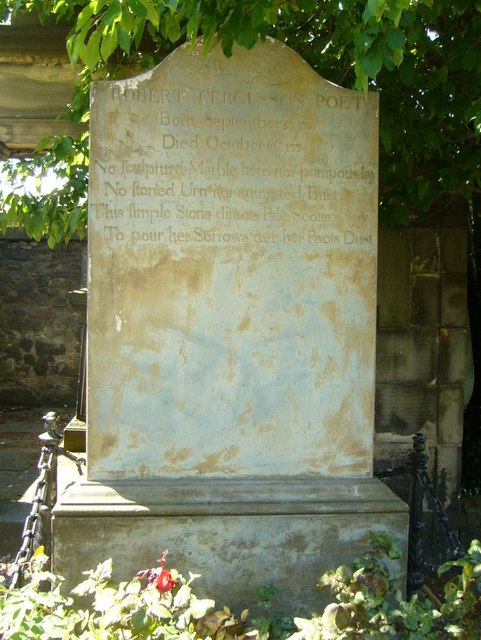
Robert Fergusson's grave

Poet Robert Fergusson (1750–1774) was trained as a minister, but abandoned this to take up poetry at the age of 22, supplementing his income by working as a clerk. His career was short-lived, and he died in the Edinburgh lunatic asylum, then called Darien House, on Bristo Street. Robert Burns was inspired to be a poet by reading Fergusson's work. It is likely that Burns left monies in his will to erect a monument in grateful memory, penning the inscription himself. After a visit to Edinburgh in 1787, Burns wrote a letter explaining his disappointment that Fergusson’s grave in Canongate Kirkyard was still unmarked, thirteen years after his death. The year of birth on the stone is incorrect, though the day and month are correct. The monument was erected in June 1828, after Burns’ own death, but at his express wish. The grave was fully restored in 2010, replacing the enclosing ironwork and chains, and cleaning the stone. The gravestone reads:

"Here lies Robert Fergusson, Poet Born September 5th 1751 Died October 16th 1774 No sculptured marble here, nor pompous lay No storied urn, nor animated bust This simple stone directs pale Scotia's way To pour her sorrows o’er her poet's dust"

The reverse is inscribed:

"By special grant of the managers to Robert Burns, who erected this stone, This burial place is to remain ever sacred To the memory of Robert Fergusson"

A further plaque within the front enclosure explains how Robert Louis Stevenson was going to re-inscribe the stone in the mid-19th century. A statue was erected to Fergusson on the pavement at the churchyard entrance in 2004.

Daniel Dow (1732–1783), fiddler and composer of vernacular music.

Rev William Lothian (1740–1783) minister of Canongate Kirk and joint founder of the Royal Society of Edinburgh.

Alexander Runciman (1736–1785) and his brother John Runciman (1744–1766) were painters. Their bronze plaque on the outer west wall of the church bears their heads, and was erected in 1866 by the Royal Scottish Academy near the then unmarked grave of Alexander. John died in Naples during his grand tour, and is buried there.

John Mackenzie, Lord MacLeod (1727–1789), the son of George Mackenzie, 3rd Earl of Cromartie and like his father a Jacobite. He captured Dunrobin Castle in 1746 during the second Jacobite rising and was subsequently convicted of high treason, but pardoned in 1748. He went on to become a Swedish Count, and later a major-general in the British army.

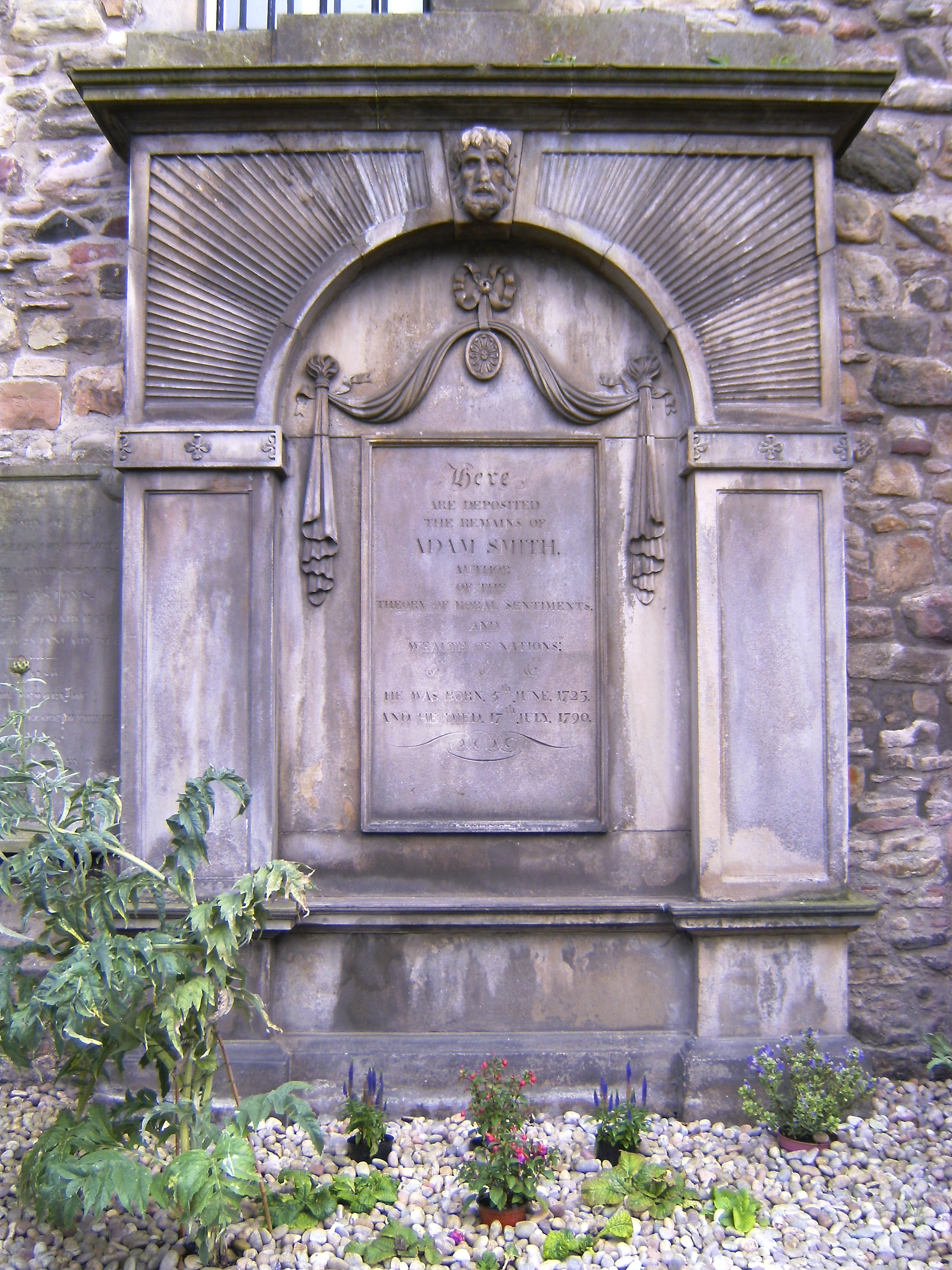
Adam Smith's tombstone

Adam Smith LLD (1723–1790), economist and author of The Wealth of Nations, founded the study of political economics. His house was very close by, at the head of Panmure Close, and it survived until 1889. He lived here from 1778 until his death in 1790, having moved from his native town of Kirkcaldy. The grave is a place of pilgrimage for economists of the world. Although an imposing railed monument, it may have been altered in the 1930s, as it was then described as "too small to notice". It is understood that Dr Joseph Black, the chemist and physicist, and James Hutton, the founder of geology, were both at his funeral, being his executors, as would have been David Douglas (see below).

Rev. Thomas Hardy (1748–1798) was Professor of Church History and Divinity, Chaplain to the King, Advocate of Church Unity, and one of the ministers of St Giles.

=== 19th-century burials ===
David Smythe, Lord Methven FRSE (1746–1806) judge.

Benjamin Bell (1749–1806) and his son Joseph Bell, (1787–1848), both surgeons, are buried in the same plot. Benjamin Bell was one of the few men to have declined a Baronetcy. He was related to Wiliam Paterson, the Scots founder of the Bank of England and was the great-grandfather of Joseph Bell, tutor to Arthur Conan Doyle, J. M. Barrie and Robert Louis Stevenson, and the inspiration for the character Sherlock Holmes. A small stone to the north of Bell's stone is of interest due to its unusual Greek inscription, taken from The Persians by Aeschylus and translated as "Dear the mound for it hides a loved heart."

Prof Very Rev Alexander Brunton (1772–1854), Moderator of the General Assembly of the Church of Scotland 1823. Professor of Hebrew and Oriental Languages at Edinburgh University. His wife, the author Mary Brunton (1778–1818) lies with him.

James Clark (1732–1808) founded of the James Clark Vet School in Edinburgh. His monument was erected by "members of the veterinary profession in Great Britain and America 1950".

Luke Fraser (1736–1821) was a teacher of Sir Walter Scott at the Royal High School. Fraser said of Scott that he was "a good Latin scholar, and very worthy man."

The grave of John Ballantyne (1774–1821), and his brother James Ballantyne (1772–1833), publishers and friends of Sir Walter Scott, has no headstone, reflecting their poverty at the end of their lives. A small bronze plaque on the base of the Fettes tomb marks their final resting place. It is inscribed:

"Here in June 1821 Sir Walter Scott, Bart, stood by the open grave of his publisher and friend John Ballantyne (1774–1821) and said "I feel as if there would be less sunshine for me this day forth" And here too lies buried his friend and printer James Ballantyne (1772–1833) Brother of the above. Erected by the Edinburgh Walter Scott Club"

The brothers were from a long-standing family of publishers in the Canongate. James, having moved to Edinburgh from Kelso in 1802, was the printer of the Waverley novels and these were first read in his house, prior to their printing. John, though partly to blame for Scott's loss of his fortune in the midst of his career, was a very dear friend to Scott, who is said to have openly wept at his funeral and whispered the above words on the plaque to John Gibson Lockhart. Scott had nicknames for both men: John was "Rigdumfunnidos"; James was "Aldiboronti-phoscophornio".

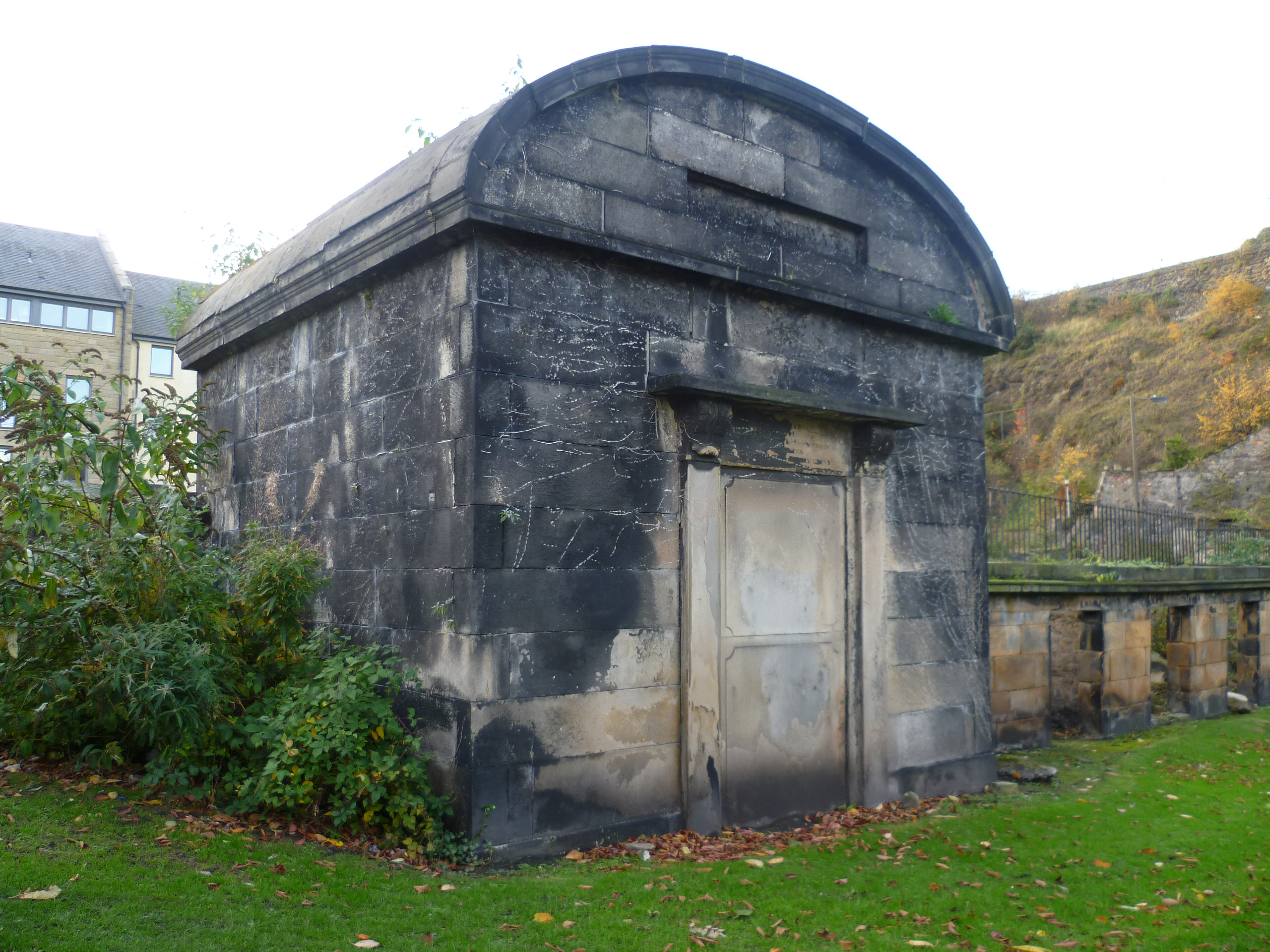
Mausoleum of Dugald Stewart

Dugald Stewart (1753–1828) was Professor of Moral Philosophy at Edinburgh University from 1785 until 1820. The son of Matthew Stewart, Professor of Mathematics, Dugald is principally remembered as author of Philosophy of the Human Mind (1792). His sealed tomb stands in the north section of the churchyard, notable as the only sealed tomb in the churchyard. The Dugald Stewart Monument erected to him on the south-west edge of Calton Hill is just out of sight from the tomb.

Hugh William Williams (1773–1829), a watercolorist and landscape artist, was known as "Grecian Williams" for his foreign studies. It was allegedly Williams who coined the term "the modern Athens" in reference to Edinburgh, therefore his resting place, with Edinburgh's "Acropolis" (Calton Hill) standing to the right, is fittingly appropriate.

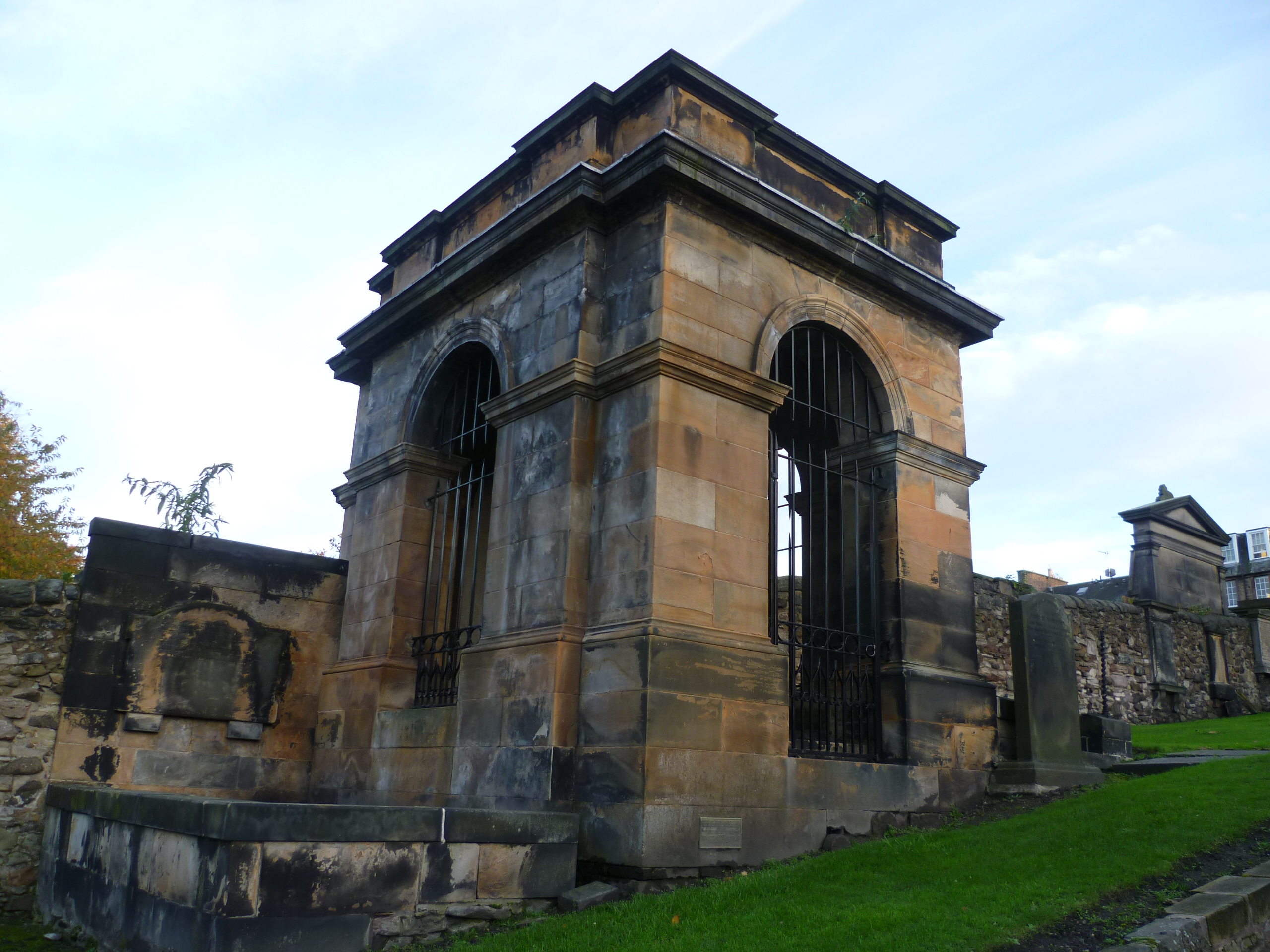
Mausoleum of Sir William Fettes

Sir William Fettes (1750–1836), a former merchant on the High Street, served as Lord Provost of Edinburgh in the early 19th century. His bequests funded the building of Fettes College (opened 1870). The monument is a large sandstone mausoleum with gilded, grey marble tablets, inscribed:

"Sacred to the memory of Sir William Fettes of Comely Bank, Baronet, Lord Provost of Edinburgh in 1801 and 1802 and a second time in 1805 and 1806 Born 25 June 1750. Died 27 May 1836... over the grave of its founder, the trustees of the Fettes Endowment have erected this monument, in grateful recognition of the enlightened benevolence which devoted the acquisitions of an honourable life to the useful purpose of providing for the children of his less fortunate fellow countrymen the elegance of a sound and liberal education"

George Chalmers (1773–1836) was a master plumber and founder of Chalmers Hospital, Edinburgh. He had lived at 208 Canongate.

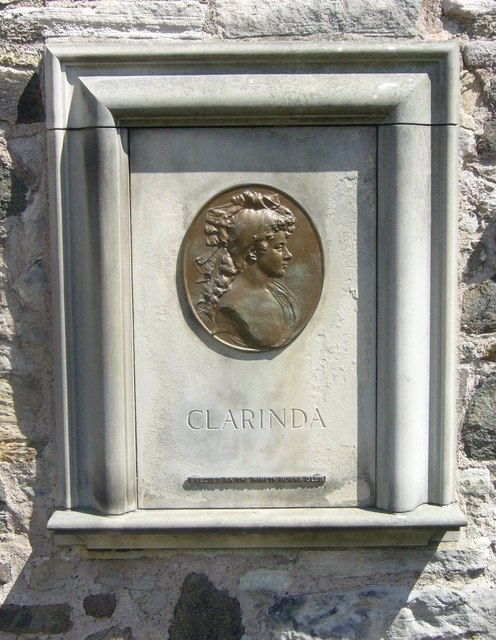
Grave of 'Clarinda'

Mrs Agnes Maclehose (1759–1841) was born in Glasgow. She separated from her husband and subsequently befriended Robert Burns, carrying on a correspondence with him under the name "Clarinda". She lived at 14 Calton Hill, and is buried in the tomb of Lord Craig. Burns wrote several poems to her (not published until 1843, after her death). The most famous of these is "Ae Fond Kiss", which includes the lines "Had we never lo’ed sae kindly, had we never lo’ed sae blindly, never met, or never parted, we’d hae ne’er been broken-hearted".

Euphemia Amelia Murray (1768–1845) was called "the Flower of Strathmore" by Robert Burns. She is interred in the ground of David Smyth of Methven.

Sir John Watson Gordon R.A. (1788–1864) was a portrait artist, and a close friend and neighbour of Henry Raeburn. He exhibited from 1821, and was a member of the Royal Scottish Academy (RSA) from 1829, exhibiting there from 1830. He was elected president to the RSA in 1850. His most famous work is the portrait of Sir Walter Scott in the National Gallery. Other subjects include Sir David Brewster and Thomas De Quincey. His brother and sister, who founded the Watson-Gordon Fine Art chair at Edinburgh University in his memory in 1879, are also buried here.

Horatius Bonar (1808–1889), a preacher and prodigious hymn-writer, was minister in Kelso from 1837, and took part in the Disruption of 1843. He was minister of Chalmers’ Memorial Church in Grage Road, Edinburgh from 1866.

=== Edinburgh Castle monument ===
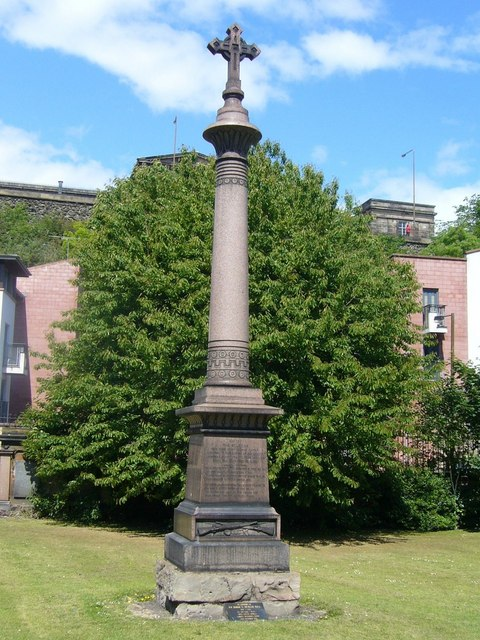
Memorial Cross for soldiers of Edinburgh Castle

A red granite cross, 26-foot (7.9 m) commemorates the soldiers of Edinburgh Castle. It was erected in May 1880, by Mr Ford of the Holyrood Glass Works, and inaugurated in the presence of General Hope and the 71st Highlanders. The dead lie in the wide open green area all around the cross, which is inscribed:

"To the memory of the soldiers who died in Edinburgh Castle, situated in the parish of Canongate, interred herewith military honours from the year 1692 to 1880. "Death called them away from the martial ranks and sad was each comrade's tread as they bore them along to the march in Saul Midst crowds to their lonely bed But their country's sons will around this stone Oft speak of the deeds of the brave And gratefully look on the grassy sod That grows o’er the soldiers grave"

Verses from the Biblical Epistles to Timothy are inscribed on the reverse.

=== 20th-century burials ===
Architect Robert Hurd (1905–1963) was responsible for the partial redevelopment of the Canongate in the 1950s, and much other work throughout Edinburgh, including the Art Deco Ravelston Garden (1936). He was interred after the official closure of the churchyard to burials, and his was the most recent interment, other than ashes.

=== Reputed burials ===
David Rizzio (or Riccio) (1533–1566) was an Italian courtier of Mary, Queen of Scots. Born near Turin, he became valet to the Queen in 1561 and was promoted to be her secretary in 1564. He was enormously unpopular and was stabbed to death, in the presence of the Queen, in her chamber in Holyrood Palace. The murderers included Mary's husband, Lord Darnley. The body was interred in Holyrood Abbey but was allegedly moved to Canongate churchyard in 1688. A small bronze plaque on the east wall of the church, above a worn 17th-century flat tombstone, reads:

"Tradition says that this is the grave of David Riccio 1533–1566 Transported from Holyrood."

It is more likely to be a fanciful story to attach to the old but illegible stone (which may be the stone of Bishop James Ramsay or Rev George Leslie). Holyrood was still a royal chapel in 1688, and there would have been little popular support to move this body to the "people's" churchyard. Rizzio being a Catholic, it is also hard to explain why he would be buried in a Protestant churchyard. If the story is true, the stone dates from roughly the time of the re-interment, and is a costly stone for someone who, particularly a century after death, would have no living friends or relatives. The bronze plaque is thought to date from the 1950s.

=== Unmarked graves ===
Other burials, for which no monument survives, include:

- James Ramsay, Bishop of Ross (1624–1696)
- Sir William Hope (1641–1724)
- David Douglas, Lord Reston (1769–1819), judge, and heir of Adam Smith
- Nicolo Pasquali (died 1757), musician
- John Schetky (1740–1824), composer and co-founder of the Boar Club
- Alexander Campbell (1764–1824), Jacobite, music-teacher and publisher of Scots songs
- William Wilson (1709–1815), known as "Mortar Willie", having fought with Bonnie Prince Charlie in 1745, rose to the rank of Colonel of the Black Watch
- James Williamson, (1777–1832), writer in law, buried at plot 49
- According to some sources, Ebenezer Lennox Scroggie, whose name is said to have inspired Charles Dickens' character Ebenezer Scrooge in A Christmas Carol, is buried here. However, this theory is now known to be "a probable Dickens hoax" for which "[n]o one could find any corroborating evidence". There is no evidence of any such grave ever having existed, nor is there a record of anyone named Scroggie in the Edinburgh census returns of the period.
