= Thomas Wilkie =

Scottish minister

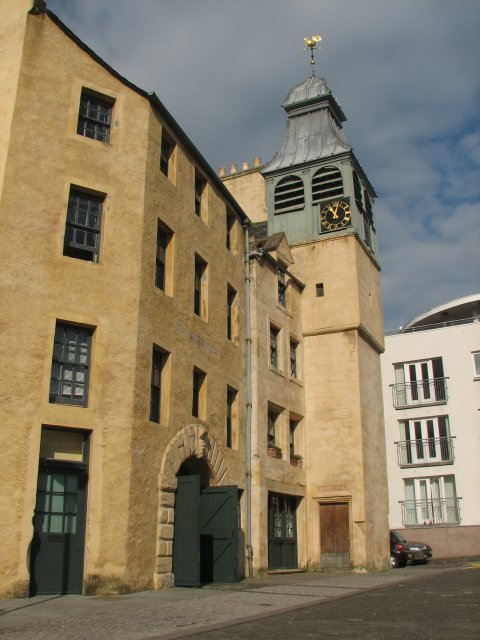
North Leith parish church and manse (including the 1675 tower)

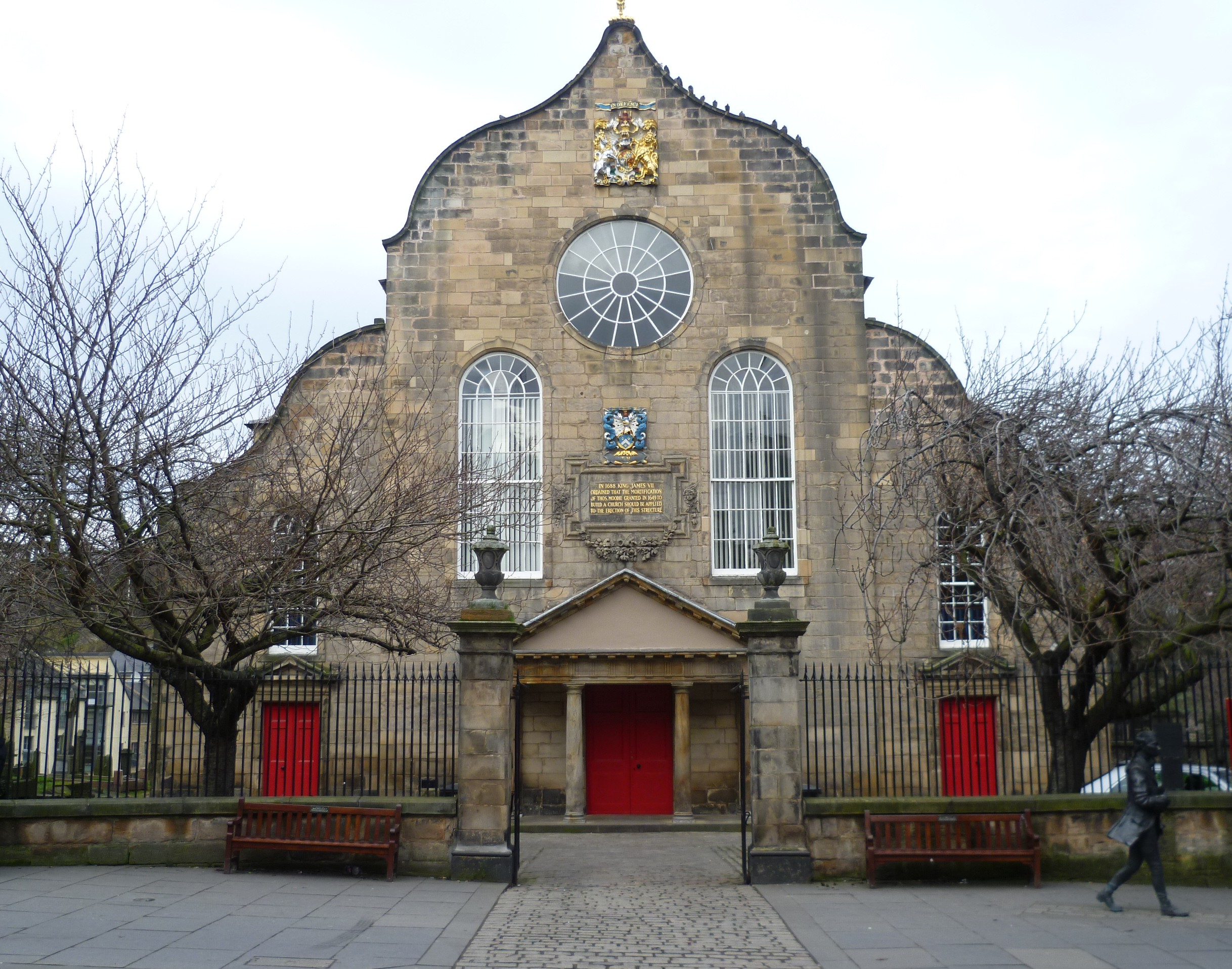
Canongate Kirk

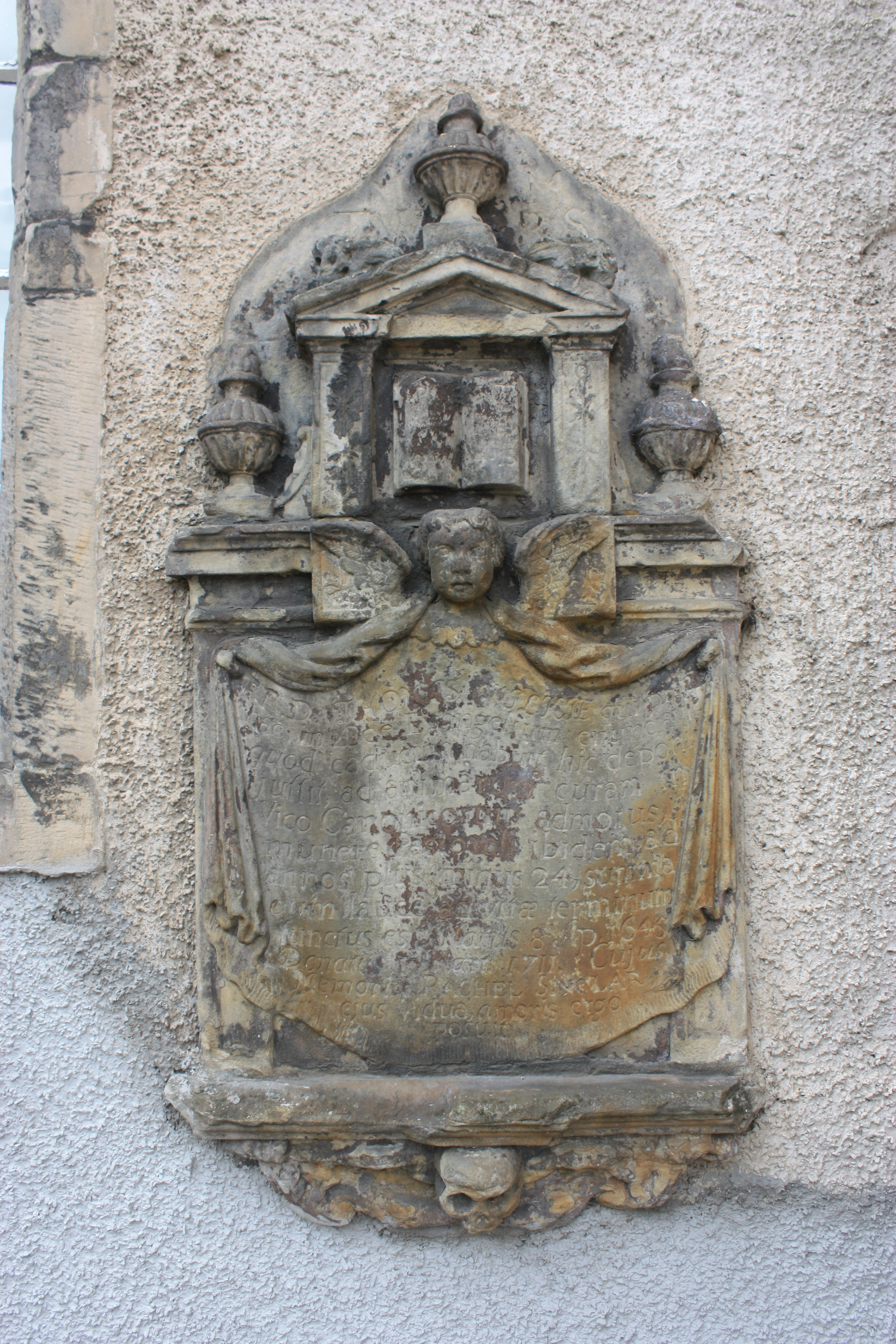
The grave of Wilkie, Canongate Kirkyard, Edinburgh

Thomas Wilkie (1645-1711) was a Scottish minister who was elected Moderator of the Church of Scotland twice: once in 1701 and once in 1704. He was the minister at the Kirk of the Canongate.

== Life ==
He was born on 6 April 1645 the son of N. N. Wilkie. His uncle Rev Thomas Wilkie (1638-1717) was the minister of Tolbooth Parish in Edinburgh (housed in St Giles Cathedral), the parish which was the forerunner of Canongate Kirk. He studied at Edinburgh University and graduated MA in 1662.

In January 1672 he translated from Galashiels Parish Church to North Leith Parish Church in the harbour district of Edinburgh. In 1687 he moved to Tolbooth Parish in Edinburgh town centre.

During Wilkie's ministry at North Leith the building was remodelled, adding a tower/Dutch steeple on the north-east corner (dated 1675) to balance the additional height added to the body of the church to accommodate Cromwell's troops in the 1650s. This tower had the first public clock in Leith.

In 1678, Hector Allan, a Quaker in Leith was found guilty of "abusing and railing" (i.e. verbally insulting) Thomas Wilkie and was rather harshly sent to the prison on the Bass Rock for this. He was later instead placed in the Leith Tolbooth (prison) until he repented.

He was the first minister to preach in the new Canongate Kirk following its construction (begun in 1688). He was placed as minister of the Canongate congregation in May 1689 but spent over two years preaching from their temporary home at Lady Yester's Church near the Edinburgh High School.

On 14 January 1690 he formed the first kirk session. The congregation continued to meet in a meeting house until 22 August 1691 when the keys of the new church were passed to him.

He died in Edinburgh on 19 March 1711. He is buried in Canongate Kirkyard against the east wall of the church.

His will bequeathed 400 books to Edinburgh University's Divinity Hall.

== Family ==
He was married to Rachel Sinclair, widow of William Hog WS and daughter of Rev John Sinclair of Ormiston.
