= Mary Brunton =

Scottish novelist (1778–1818)

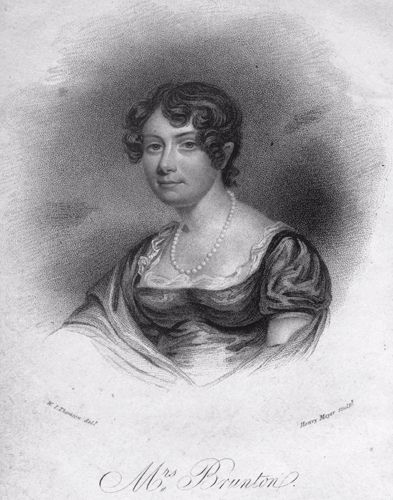
- From the 2nd edition of Emmeline (1820)
- Born: Mary Balfour; 1 November 1778
- Died: 12 December 1818 (aged 40)
- Occupation: Novelist
- Writing career
- Language: English
- Notable works: Self-Control; Discipline; Emmeline

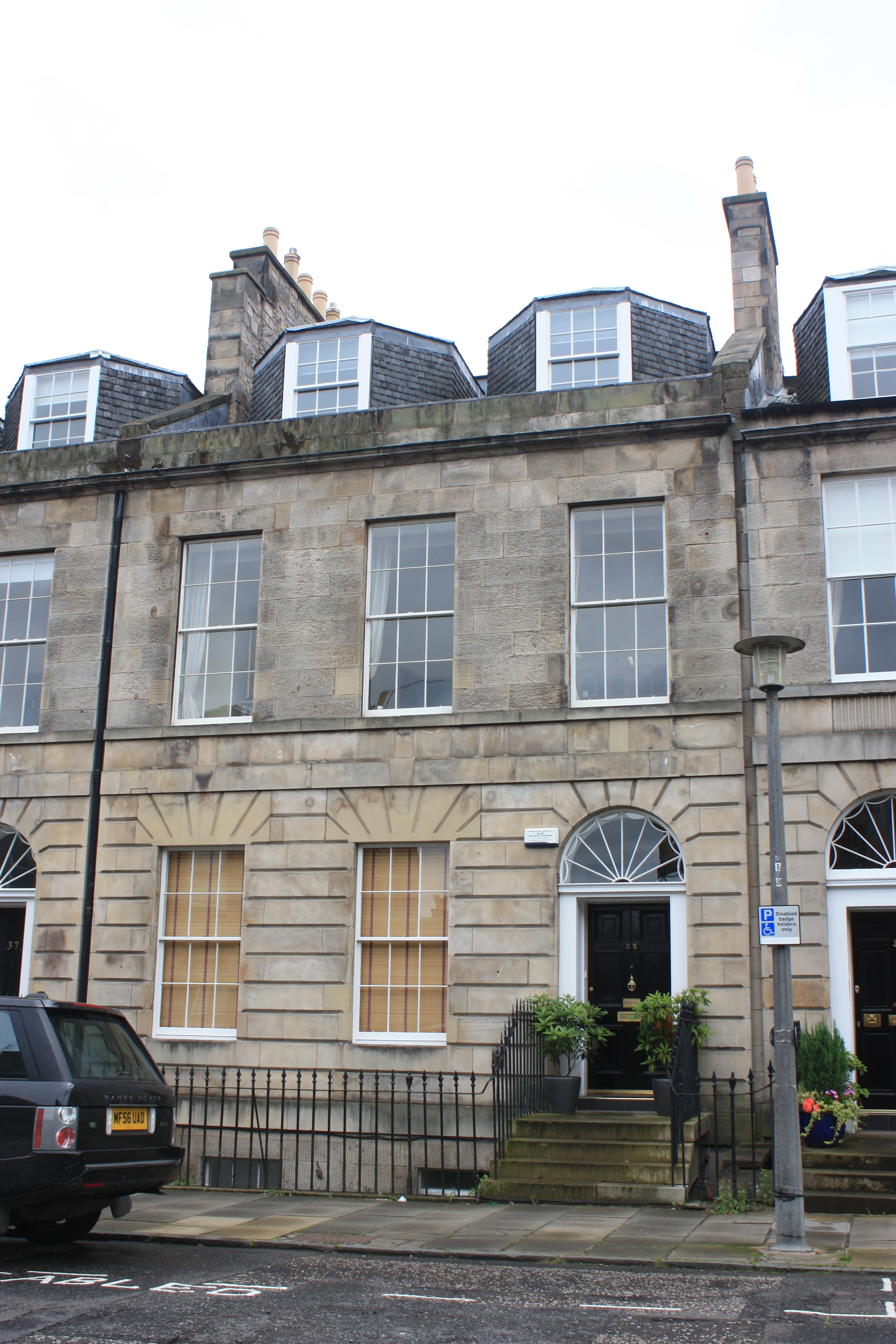
35 Albany Street, Edinburgh

Mary Brunton (née Balfour) (1 November 1778 – 7 December 1818) was a Scottish novelist, whose work has been seen as redefining femininity. Fay Weldon praised Brunton's writings as "rich in invention, ripe with incident, shrewd in comment, and erotic in intention and fact."

== Life ==
Mary Balfour (married name Brunton) was the daughter of Colonel Thomas Balfour of Elwick, a British Army officer, and Frances Ligonier, daughter of Colonel Francis Ligonier and sister of the second earl of Ligonier. She was born on 1 November 1778 on Burray in the Orkney Islands. Her early education was limited, but her mother taught her music, Italian and French.

About 1798, she met the Rev. Alexander Brunton, a Church of Scotland minister. Although her mother disapproved of the match, she eloped with Brunton on 4 December 1798, when he rescued her from the island of Gairsay in a rowing boat. He was minister at Bolton, near Haddington, East Lothian, until 1797, then at two successive Edinburgh parishes: New Greyfriars from 1803 and Tron from 1809, becoming in the meantime Professor of Oriental Languages at the University in 1813.

Their marriage was happy, and they had no children. Guided by her husband, she developed an interest in philosophy, and remarked in a letter to her sister-in-law that she was in favour of women learning ancient languages and mathematics, which was still a rare female accomplishment in that period. The couple made a tour to Harrogate and the English Lake District in 1809, although the former did not meet with her approval: "A scene without a hill seems to me to be about as interesting as a face without a nose!" (p. xxxii, Introduction)

Brunton became pregnant at the age of 39. She died at their house, 35 Albany Street in Edinburgh, on 12 December 1818, five days after giving birth to a stillborn son.

She is buried against the western boundary wall of Canongate Kirkyard on the Royal Mile. Her husband is buried beside her.

== Writings ==
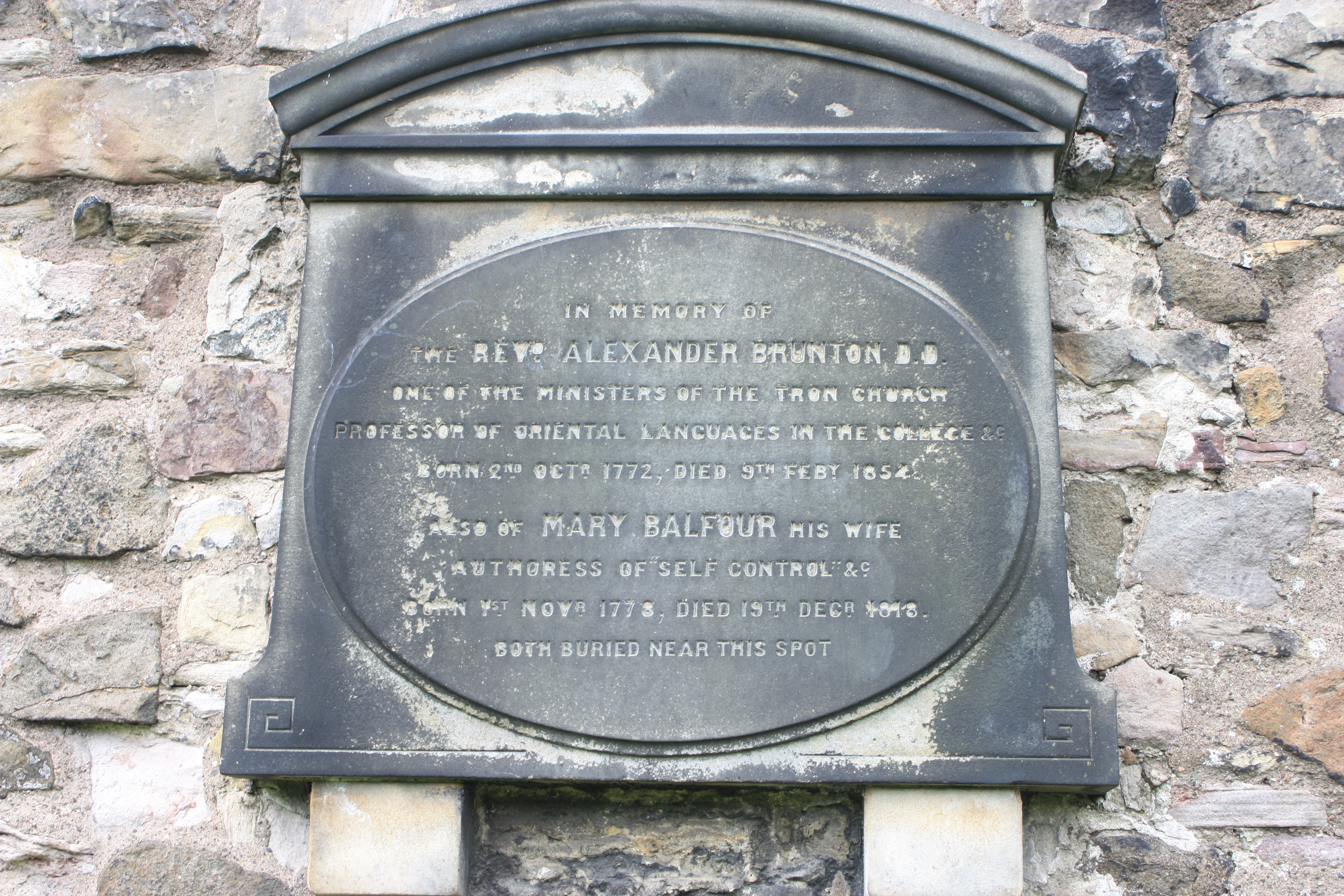
The grave of Rev. Alexander Brunton and his wife Mary, Canongate Kirkyard

Brunton started her first novel, Self-Control, in 1809 and it appeared in 1811. One admirer was Charlotte Barrett (1786–1870), niece of the novelists Frances Burney and Sarah Burney and mother of the writer Julia Maitland. Writing to Sarah on 17 May 1811, Charlotte commented: "I read Self-Countroul & like it extremely all except some vulgarity meant to be jocular which tired me to death, but I think the principal character charming & well supported & the book really gives good lessons." Jane Austen had reservations, judging it in a letter as an "excellently-meant, elegantly-written work, without anything of Nature or Probability in it." Brunton, in contrasting self-control with sensibility, was moving towards a redefinition of femininity. Self-Control was widely read and went into a third edition in 1812. A French translation (Laure Montreville, ou l'Empire sur soimême) appeared in Paris in 1829. The anonymous novels Things by their Right Names (1812) and Rhoda by Frances Jacson were initially ascribed to her as well.

The other novel that Brunton completed was Discipline (1814). Like Walter Scott's Waverley, published in the same year, it was much appreciated for its Highland scenes. It reappeared twice in two years. The Bruntons spent some time in London in 1815 and Brunton began to learn Gaelic in the same year. She then planned a series of domestic stories, of which one, Emmeline, was far enough advanced when she died for her husband to include it in an 1819 memorial volume, along with a Memoir and extracts from her travel diary. The story describes with a sympathy unusual in the period how a divorced woman's marriage is destroyed by her feelings of guilt and the ostracism she suffers.

The success of Brunton's novels seems to have lain in combining a strongly moral, religious stance with events that stretched or broke the rules of society. Although the presence of "pulsating sexuality" may be an exaggeration, her heroines certainly "experience destitution struggling to survive as women on their own and enter the dark night of the soul, but rise from the depths of despair through a growing religious strength." According to Fay Weldon, "Improving the Brunton novels may be, but what fun they are to read, rich in invention, ripe with incident, shrewd in comment, and erotic in intention and fact."

The Works of Mary Brunton appeared in 1820 and further editions of her first two novels in 1832, 1837 and 1852. However, their immediate popularity was somewhat short-lived: "They rose very fast into celebrity, and their popularity seems to have as quickly sunk away," as her husband put it in retrospect. Modern editions have appeared of Self-Control (London: Pandora Press, 1986), Discipline (London: Pandora Press, 1986; Boston, MA: Unwin Hyman, 1987) and Emmeline (London: Routledge, 1992, facsimile of the 1819 edition).

== Bibliography ==
- Self-Control, 1811
- Discipline, 1814
- Emmeline, with some other pieces, 1819
