= William Jackson (journalist) =

Irish preacher and writer

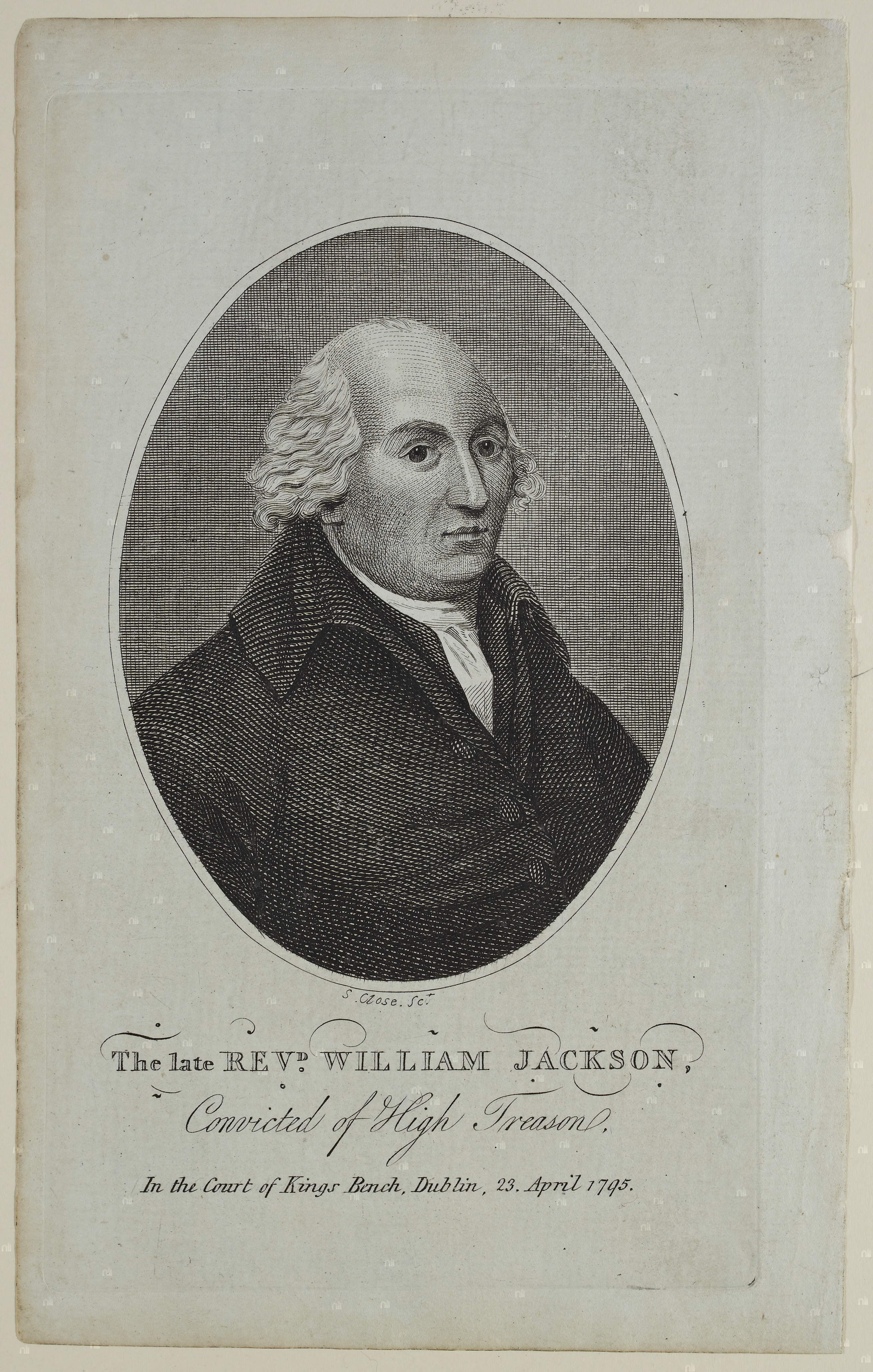
Engraving of Jackson, circa 1800

The Reverend William Jackson (1737 – 30 April 1795) was a noted Irish preacher, journalist, playwright, and radical. He served first as a preacher and private chaplain of the Church of England before moving into journalism, writing for several newspapers in London across both sides of the political aisle.

In the 1770s, he took up the cause of Elizabeth Chudleigh as her secretary and publicist of sorts once she came under attack for charges of bigamy. This brought him into contact with Samuel Foote. Chudleigh, Jackson and Foote would all become embroiled in a very public feud, which would see all three face legal trouble for bigamy, sodomy and libel.

By the 1790s, Jackson had come to reside in France and became involved with a sect of Irish radicals. After being chosen for a mission under the Committee of Public Safety to visit England and Ireland, he was arrested in Dublin following meetings with the United Irish leaders Theobald Wolfe Tone and Archibald Hamilton Rowan. Charged with being an agent of the French Directory he was tried for treason; however, he committed suicide before he could be executed.

== Early life ==
William Jackson was born in Newtownards, County Down, in 1737. He studied at Oxford and became an Anglican curate. Much is unclear about Jackson's early life. He was evidently an attractive young man, notable for his popular preaching style and his outspoken opposition politics. He married, but lost his first wife to breast cancer in the early 1770s. In the 1760s, Jackson served briefly in some capacity in the household of Augustus John Hervey, later the third Earl of Bristol. He claims to have travelled to Ireland and resided with Barry Maxwell, 1st Earl of Farnham when Hervey's older brother, George, was made Lord Lieutenant in 1766 (although the Oxford Dictionary of National Biographies entries on both Herveys insist that neither ever travelled to Ireland at this time). In that same decade, Jackson moved to London, where he preached at the Tavistock Chapel and St Mary-le-Strand. Although Jackson gained some popularity as a preacher, he remained unbeneficed and eventually turned to journalism to support himself.

== Editor of The Public Ledger ==
In 1772, Jackson became the editor of The Public Ledger. Under his editorship, this London paper became increasingly strident and oppositional in its politics. Jackson gained notoriety for his bold style of writing and harsh criticisms of public figures. It was in his capacity as the editor of The Public Ledger that he was introduced to Elizabeth Chudleigh (the self-styled Duchess of Kingston, who was facing trial for bigamy) by one of her lawyers, John Cockayne. Even if Jackson had not met Chudleigh before, he was certainly familiar with her history, for her first (and true) husband was his former employer, Augustus Hervey. Embroiled in scandal over her trial for bigamy, Chudleigh hired Jackson to provide sympathetic press coverage as her private secretary. Jackson soon became a trusted confidante and advisor for the next decade.

Jackson's chief contribution to Chudleigh's cause came in the form of a smear campaign against the popular actor and playwright, Samuel Foote. A mimic and satirist, Foote earned Chudleigh's enmity by writing a play that capitalised on her legal troubles. Chudleigh exerted enough influence to have the play, A Trip to Calais, suppressed by the Lord Chamberlain in 1775. When Foote threatened to publish the banned play, Jackson spearheaded a newspaper campaign that accused Foote of being a sodomite (a capital crime). Foote responded by vilifying Jackson in a play called The Capuchin (1776), which was a rehashed version of the banned A Trip to Calais. Jackson was the model for the character, Dr. Viper, the unscrupulous editor of the fictional Scandalous Chronicle. To make the association perfectly clear, the actor playing Viper wore a copy of Jackson's well-known silk coat embroidered with frogs. Jackson carried on the literary dispute by publishing two anti-Foote poems, Asmodeus and Sodom and Onan (both 1776). In the end, Foote was acquitted of the charges of sodomy in the Court of Kings Bench, at which point he commenced proceedings for a libel prosecution against The Public Ledger. Foote's lawyers convinced the then manager of the paper, Thomas Brewman to provide proof that Jackson wrote the libelous paragraphs about Foote, thus saving the paper from prosecution. A subpoena was issued for Jackson and he was forced to flee to France in April 1777 to avoid a trial for libel that Foote had initiated. Jackson did not have to stay long in exile because Foote died on 21 October of that same year.

== Return to England ==
After Foote's death, Jackson returned to England. He resumed his political activities by publishing The Constitutions of the Several Independent States of America in 1783, with a dedication to the opposition leader, the Duke of Portland. But the following year, he was secretly hired by the Prime Minister, William Pitt the Younger, to support the government in The Morning Post. Publishing anonymously, Jackson attacked his former allies with his usual vehemence until he was found out in September 1784 and was soundly damned for his apostasy. As a result of this episode, he found himself generally excluded from English politics. Jackson's next appearance in public resulted in yet another scandal. In 1787 he joined forces with "Gentleman" John Palmer—the actor who had ridiculed him as Dr. Viper in Foote's play a decade earlier. Their goal was to build from the ground up a new theatre in the City of London at Tower Hamlets. Jackson and Palmer persuaded investors to sink more than eighteen thousand pounds into the construction of the Royalty Theatre; however, while there was no law against building a theatre in London, there was a law against operating one without the Lord Chamberlain's authorisation. Jackson and Palmer had no such authorisation, and so the theatre was shut down after just one night. The duped investors initiated legal action, and so Jackson again fled to France in the Spring of 1789, where he arrived on the eve of the revolution. Here he accompanied Colonel Glover following the death of Elizabeth Chudleigh, both Glover and Jackson sought their share of the Duchess's will. It is evident that Jackson continued to operate as a journalist after moving to the continent, writing first for the Morning Star and then the Oracle until the Spring of 1794.

== Radicalism and treason ==
During his stay in Paris, Jackson was swept up in the revolutionary fervour and became involved with the radical British expatriate set there. He was in attendance at the famous meeting at White's Hotel in November 1792, a gathering that included Lord Edward Fitzgerald and Thomas Paine. Jackson became allied politically with the Jacobins and in response to the English declaration of war against France, he published An Answer to the Declaration of the King of England Respecting his Motives for Carrying on the Present War (1793). Swept up in the general arrest of British subjects in 1793, Jackson was released from prison on the strength of his radical commitments, including the publication of the anti-English pamphlet. Upon his release from prison, Jackson became inspector of horses for Meaux and later in 1793 was commissioned as a spy for the French. Nicholas Madgett, an Irishman who worked in the Marine Ministry, recruited Jackson to go to England and Ireland to assess the public's inclination towards armed revolution. Jackson arrived in London in early 1794 and became reacquainted with John Cockayne, the lawyer who had introduced him to Elizabeth Chudleigh two decades earlier. Jackson revealed his mission to Cockayne, who promptly revealed it to the Prime Minister out of fear of being tried for treason himself. When Jackson left London for Dublin, he was accompanied by Cockayne. In Ireland, they met with several radical United Irish leaders, including Theobald Wolfe Tone, James Reynolds and Archibald Hamilton Rowan. Rowan, in particular, was tempted by Jackson's talk of French assistance, and persuaded Tone to write up a report for the French, indicating Irish willingness to rise up. Jackson made the fatal mistake of placing Tone's report and other letters in the public mail, where they were seized by the authorities. This seizure led to Jackson's arrest on 28 April 1794.

== Trial and death ==
Jackson remained in prison for a year before his trial took place. The delays were at his request, allowing him time to assemble a defence and procure witnesses. During his imprisonment, he wrote his last work, Observations in Answer to Mr. Thomas Paine's Age of Reason (1795), which took issue with Thomas Paine's Deism. The work is notable for the way Jackson promotes Anglican orthodoxy while also praising Paine for his politics and betraying no remorse for his own treason. His trial took place on 23 April 1795, in Dublin and he was found guilty. One week later, on the morning of his sentencing hearing, Jackson stepped into the dock looking terribly ill. He reportedly vomited out of the carriage window on his ride from prison to the courtroom, and when he removed his hat, one observer noted that steam rose from his head. As his lawyers made drawn-out speeches, hoping to avoid judgment on the technicality of an improperly filed indictment, Jackson's condition steadily worsened. He gripped his sides, shuddering and grimacing in pain. The judges ordered that a chair be provided for him and asked that a doctor attend to him. He then collapsed and died. An autopsy found that Jackson had ingested a large quantity of a "metallic poison". This was likely administered by his (then pregnant) second wife, but the inquest pointedly refused to assign blame. The effect of his suicide was that he had not actually been pronounced guilty of treason by the court, so his family could inherit his goods and a pension. No such clemency was shown to Lord Edward Fitzgerald in 1798 who died of his wounds before trial but was found posthumously guilty of high treason. Jackson was survived by his wife, one son, and one daughter.
