= George Nares (judge) =

English barrister, judge and politician

Sir George Nares (1716–1786) was an English barrister, judge, and politician.

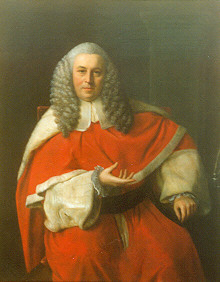
Sir George Nares, 1774 portrait

== Life ==
Born at Hanwell, Middlesex, he was the younger son of George Nares of Albury, Oxfordshire, steward to the Earl of Abingdon; James Nares was his elder brother. He was educated at Magdalen College School, Oxford, was admitted a member of the Inner Temple on 19 October 1738, and was called to the bar on 12 June 1741.

Nares practised in the criminal courts, and defended Elizabeth Canning, charged with perjury, in April 1754. He received the degree of the coif on 6 February 1759, and in the same year was appointed one of the king's serjeants. He was employed as one of the counsel for the crown in several of the cases arising out of the seizure in 1763 of issue No. 45 of The North Briton. At the general election in March 1768 he was returned to the House of Commons for Oxford, of which he was already recorder. He spoke in favour of Lord Barrington's motion for the expulsion of John Wilkes on 3 February 1769.

Lord Apsley appointed Nares a justice of the court of common pleas, and he was sworn in on 26 January 1771; he was knighted on the following day. Nares took part in the hearing of Brass Crosby's case, Fabrigas v. Mostyn, and Sayre v. Earl of Rochford. After holding office for over 15 years, Nares died at Ramsgate on 20 July 1786, and was buried at Eversley, Hampshire, where there was a monument to his memory.

Nares was created a D.C.L. of Oxford University on 7 July 1773. He was ridiculed by Samuel Foote in his comedy of The Lame Lover, as the character of Serjeant Circuit.

== Family ==
Nares married, on 23 September 1751, Mary, third daughter of Sir John Strange, master of the rolls; she died on 6 August 1782, aged 55. Their eldest son, John, a magistrate at Bow Street and a bencher of the Inner Temple, died on 16 December 1816, and was the grandfather of George Strong Nares the Arctic explorer. George Strange, their second son, became a captain in the 70th regiment of foot, and died in the West Indies in 1794. Their youngest son was Edward Nares.

== Notes ==
Attribution

This article incorporates text from a publication now in the public domain: Lee, Sidney, ed. (1894). "Nares, George". Dictionary of National Biography. Vol. 40. London: Smith, Elder & Co.

Parliament of Great Britain
Preceded by Sir Thomas Stapleton, Bt; Hon. Robert Lee	Member of Parliament for Oxford; 1768–1771; With: Hon. William Harcourt	Succeeded by Lord Robert Spencer; Hon. William Harcourt
