= Public Ledger =

Public Ledger may refer to:

- The Public Ledger, an agricultural commodities journal in London, first published in 1760 and still published today
- Public Ledger (Philadelphia), a daily newspaper in Philadelphia, Pennsylvania, published from 1836 to 1942
- Public Ledger (Tennessee), a daily newspaper in Memphis, Tennessee, published from 1865 to 1893
- The Public Ledger (Kentucky) a daily newspaper in Maysville, Kentucky, published from 1892 to 1935
- Blockchain (database) - a cryptographic implementation of a public ledger
