= The Duchess Countess =

2022 book by Catherine Ostler

The Duchess Countess: The Woman Who Scandalized Eighteenth-Century London
- Author: Catherine Ostler
- Language: English
- Subject: Elizabeth Chudleigh
- Publisher: Atria Books
- Publication date: February 22, 2022
- Pages: 432
- ISBN: 978-1-9821-7973-1

The Duchess Countess: The Woman Who Scandalized Eighteenth-Century London is a 2022 book by Catherine Ostler that examines the life of Elizabeth Chudleigh.

== Reception ==
Ophelia Field, in The Times Literary Supplement, complemented "empathetic perspective, combined with rigorous scholarship", which set the work apart from previous accounts—such as T. H. White's The Age of Scandal. Allan Massie, writing in The Wall Street Journal, called it a "a rich and compelling book".
