= Thomas Robson (actor) =

English actor (1737–1813)

Thomas Robson (1737–1813) was a British stage actor and singer. Born as Thomas Robson Brownhill in Hull in 1737, he began his career in provincial theatre appearing in Norwich in the late 1760s. In 1769 he was at the Richmond Theatre and the following year made his London debut at the Theatre Royal, Haymarket then under the management of Samuel Foote. He originated roles of several of Foote's new farces, and also appeared the Orchard Street Theatre in Bath and the Smock Alley Theatre in Dublin over the next few years. In 1776 he joined the company of the Theatre Royal, Covent Garden and remained there until 1782, appearing in over a hundred roles. His last known roles in London were at the Haymarket in 1784.

Later in life he was a driving force behind the construction of the Theatre Royal, Margate from 1786 to provide entertainment for the growing Kent coastal town. He died in Richmond, Surrey in 1813 according to The Gentleman's Magazine.

== Selected roles ==
- Colonel Secret in The Lame Lover by Samuel Foote (1770)
- Achates in Dido by Thomas Bridges (1771)
- Harcourt in Percy by Hannah More (1777)
- Courtall in The Belle's Stratagem by Hannah Cowley (1780)

== Bibliography ==
- Highfill, Philip H, Burnim, Kalman A. & Langhans, Edward A. A Biographical Dictionary of Actors, Actresses, Musicians, Dancers, Managers & Other Stage Personnel in London, 1660–1800, Volume 13. SIU Press, 1993.
- Straub, Kristina, G. Anderson, Misty and O'Quinn, Daniel . The Routledge Anthology of Restoration and Eighteenth-Century Drama. Taylor & Francis, 2017.
