= The Nabob =

1772 play

The Nabob is a comedy play, a satire, by the English writer Samuel Foote. It was first performed at the Haymarket Theatre on 29 June 1772. The first interpretation of the role of Mrs Matchem was made by Mrs Gardner. Isaac Reed, by profession a lawyer, journalist, editor, and biographer, saw The Nabob performed four times, first in 1772, twice in 1774, and then again in 1781.

A wealthy nabob Sir Matthew Mite returns to England from India and tries to buy his way into British political system. He hoped to use his Bengal loot to marry into an ancient family (demanded the hand of John Oldham's daughter) and corruptly buy election to Parliament for the constituency of Bribe 'em. At one point in the play, Mite's assistant, Touchit, explains the methods by which Mite and his cronies made their fortunes:
Touchit: We cunningly encroach and fortify little by little, till at length, we are growing too strong for the natives, and then we turn them out of their lands, and take possession of their money and jewels.
Mayor: And don’t you think, Mr Touchit, that is a little uncivil of us?
Touchit: Oh, nothing at all! These people are little better than Tartars or Turks.
Mayor: No, no, Mr Touchit; just the reverse: it is they who have caught the Tartars in us.

== Bibliography ==
- Nechtman, Tillman W. Nabobs: Empire and Identity in Eighteenth-Century Britain. Cambridge University Presses, 2010.
- Taylor, George (ed). Plays by Samuel Foote and Arthur Murphy. Cambridge University Press, 1984.
- Dalrymple, William The Anarchy: The East India Company, Corporate Violence and the Pillage of an Empire. Bloomsbury Publishing, 2020
