= Charlotte Forman =

British journalist, translator, and essayist

Charlotte Forman (1715–1787) was a British journalist, translator, political essayist and activist. Between 1756 and 1780, she wrote political essays and news from abroad for many newspapers under various pseudonyms, most notably Probus (in The Gazetteer and the Public Ledger). Unknown in her lifetime, in more recent years Forman's career has garnered significance as she was one of the few women of the period who wrote essays on what were considered masculine subjects (politics and trade).

Essays and writings which can be attributed to her have been described as erudite and moralising and, due to sexist attitudes towards women prevalent at the time, were considered to have been written by a man.

== Early life ==
Forman was one of five children of Charles Forman, an Irish Jacobite and pamphleteer, and his wife Mary. During the Jacobite rising of 1715, her father (a clerk of the English war office) fled to France after he delayed sending orders to the English general Charles Wills, who was fighting the Jacobites. Therefore, there is ambiguity as to whether Charlotte was born in England or France, although she later wrote that she was "nursed in the palace of the Trianon" in France. She however lived in London for most of her life in extreme poverty, and went into debtors' prison for a short time in 1767.

== Writing career ==
Forman was unknown in her lifetime but in more recent years her career garnered significance as she was one of the few women of the period who wrote essays on stereotypically masculine subjects. Forman wrote a number of political essays for the Gazetteer and London Daily Advertiser between 1756 and 1760, then continued in the Public Ledger, or, Daily Register of Commerce and Intelligence in 1760. Both newspapers were aimed at merchants, traders, and shopkeepers in London, and contained information relating to international trade such as shipping news and offers of wholesale and retail goods. Forman wrote a number of letters 'To the printer' as a regular correspondent.

Forman's essays in the Gazetteer and the Public Ledger, all signed under the pseudonym Probus, were written in the months leading up to and during the Seven Years' War. A large number (roughly 200) of the surviving essays comment upon the diplomatic news, offering historical background relevant to understanding the interests of the contending nations, weighing the credibility of various news reports, and analysing the interests of England, Prussia, France, Holland, Austria, Russia, Spain, Sweden, and Denmark. She consistently supported the English war effort, reassures readers that England has the capacity to defeat France, defends Frederick the Great and William Pitt the Elder from critics, and argues against a premature peace that would make unnecessary concessions to France.

Her frequent correspondence with Radical satirist and politician John Wilkes have been described as providing modern readers with "graphic evidence of the struggles of an independent woman in the 18th century attempting to support herself by writing". She described herself as a literary day labourer.

She is not known to have published anything under her own name, although there are almost certainly many works published anonymously which cannot now be attributed.
