= Elizabeth Pierrepont, Duchess of Kingston-upon-Hull =

English courtier (1721-1788)

Her Grace The Duchess of Kingston-upon-Hull
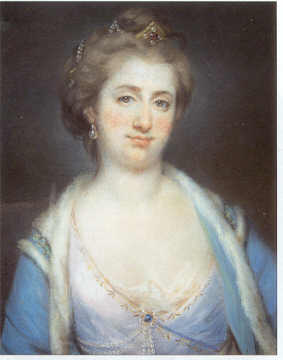
- Portrait by Francis Cotes
- Tenure: 8 March 1769 - 23 September 1773
- Born: Elizabeth Chudleigh; 8 March 1721; London, England
- Died: 26 August 1788 (aged 67); Paris, France
- Spouses: Augustus Hervey, 3rd Earl of Bristol (m. 1744; died 1779) Evelyn Pierrepont, 2nd Duke of Kingston-upon-Hull (m. 1769; died 1773)
- Father: Colonel Thomas Chudleigh
- Mother: Henrietta Clifford
- Occupation: Maid of Honour to Princess Augusta of Saxe-Gotha

Elizabeth Pierrepont (née Chudleigh), Duchess of Kingston (8 March 1721 – 26 August 1788), sometimes called Countess of Bristol, was an English courtier, known by her contemporaries for her adventurous life style.

She was the daughter of Colonel Thomas Chudleigh (died 1726), and was appointed maid of honour to Augusta, Princess of Wales, in 1743, probably through the good offices of her friend William Pulteney, 1st Earl of Bath. With the secret collusion of her first husband, Augustus Hervey, she obtained an ecclesiastical court ruling pronouncing her a spinster, freeing her to publicly marry Evelyn Pierrepont, 2nd Duke of Kingston-upon-Hull. However, following the Duke's death, his nephew launched a hostile challenge to her inheritance; the House of Lords subsequently invalidated the original church decree. In 1776, Chudleigh was found guilty of bigamy at a trial by her peers at Westminster Hall that attracted 4,000 spectators.

== Early life ==
Elizabeth Chudleigh was born on 8 March 1721. Her father, Colonel Thomas Chudleigh, was lieutenant governor of the Royal Hospital, Chelsea; he died while she was a small child.

== Marriage to Augustus Hervey, 3rd Earl of Bristol ==
Chudleigh did not lack admirers, among them James Hamilton, 6th Duke of Hamilton, and Augustus Hervey, later 3rd Earl of Bristol, but, at that time, a younger grandson of the first Earl. On 4 August 1744, she was privately married to Hervey at Lainston House, a private country house with its parish church (St Peter's, now a ruin), near Winchester. The wedding was held at night to preserve the secrecy. Both husband and wife lacked the financial support they needed, and their union was kept secret to enable Chudleigh to retain her post at court, while Hervey, a naval officer, rejoined his ship, returning to England toward the close of 1746.

The marriage was unhappy, and for years, the pair did not live together. Married in secret, their marriage did not seem to need to be dissolved. However, when it appeared in 1759 that Hervey could succeed his brother as Earl of Bristol, Chudleigh established proof of their marriage by forging an entry in the parish register at Lainston, unbeknownst to him.

== Marriage to Evelyn Pierrepont, 2nd Duke of Kingston-upon-Hull ==
Chudleigh "cut a prominent figure" in British society, and in 1765 in Berlin, she had the honor to meet Frederick the Great. Then, she became the mistress of Evelyn Pierrepont, 2nd Duke of Kingston-upon-Hull.

Hervey wanted to end their marriage by divorce, but Chudleigh preferred to avoid any public acknowledgment of it. She initiated a suit of jactitation against him though with his collusion, requiring him to cease claiming marriage to her unless proved. After Hervey failed to prove the relationship in court and Chudleigh swore she was unmarried, the consistory court in February 1769 pronounced her a spinster, free to marry.

Within a month, she married Kingston and became Elizabeth Pierrepont, Duchess of Kingston-upon-Hull. On Knightsbridge, in the City of Westminster, the Duke built for her a grand town house called Chudleigh House, later renamed as Kingston House.

Kingston died in 1773, leaving Chudleigh all his property, on condition she remain a widow.

== Charges of bigamy ==
In 1775, her first husband's brother died, and Hervey became Earl of Bristol. If Chudleigh's marriage to Hervey had been lawful, despite her denials, she had therefore become Countess of Bristol.

Chudleigh was forced to return to England after Evelyn Meadows (died 1826), a nephew of her second husband, brought a charge of bigamy against her, in the hope of establishing a challenge to the Duke of Kingston's will. In December 1775 she attempted unsuccessfully to have the charge set aside, by reason of the previous judgment in her favour. However, in 1776 she was tried as a peeress in Westminster Hall and was found guilty by 116 peers, without dissent. Absconding with her Kingston fortune, she hurriedly left England to avoid further proceedings on the part of the Meadows family.

In 1777, Hervey gained legal recognition that his marriage to Chudleigh had been lawful, but he did not pursue divorce proceedings, probably because of his involvement with the suit of jactitation.

== Later life and legacy ==
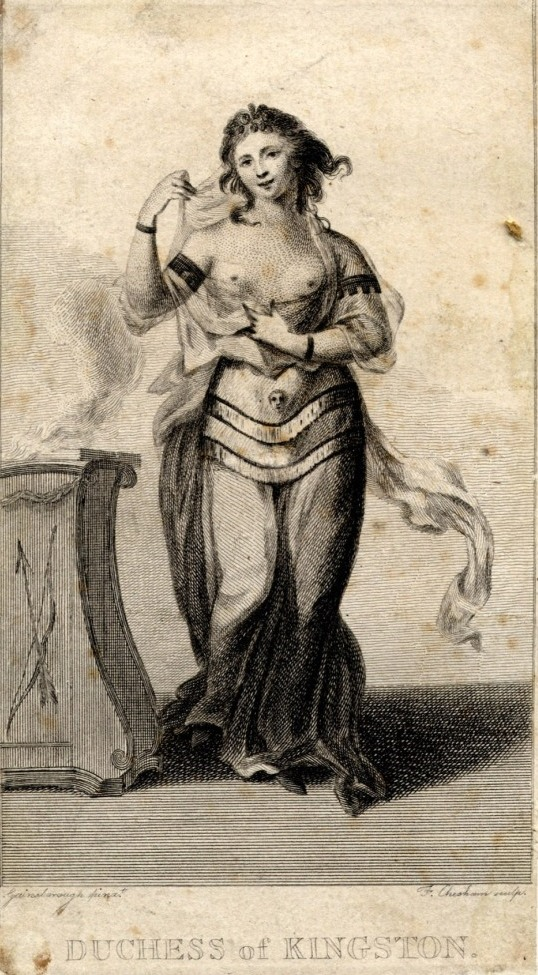
Elizabeth Chudleigh at a ball in 1749

After Kingston's death, she travelled abroad. Visiting Rome, she was received with the honour due to a duchess by Pope Clement XIV.

Chudleigh lived for a time in Calais, and became mistress to Stefano Zannowich. In 1777, after her acceptance at the Russian court, the two had a boat built and made a spectacular entrance sailing into Kronstadt, the port of Saint Petersburg. In the Governorate of Estonia, she bought three properties: Toila, Oru and Voka (Fockenhoff) (near the town of Jõhvi in Ida-Viru County, northeastern Estonia), consolidating them into an estate she named "Chudleigh". She planned to create a model English estate and imported spaniels, pointers, and a collection of plants, living there in a clifftop house looking over the Baltic Sea.

Chudleigh continued to style herself as Duchess of Kingston, residing in her Paris estate in Montmartre, Rome, and elsewhere, and died at her estate at Saint-Assise near Paris on 26 August 1788 aged 67, in the eyes of the law as Dowager Countess of Bristol, as Hervey had died in 1779.

== In popular culture ==
Chudleigh appears as a character in T. H. White's non-fiction The Age of Scandal and in Theodore Sturgeon's historical romance I, Libertine, which began as a hoax. She appears as a non-speaking character in the play Mr Foote's Other Leg, in which the controversy surrounding her and Foote is portrayed as central to the latter's fall.

The Duchess or Countess, said to be coarse and licentious, was ridiculed as the character Kitty Crocodile by the comedian Samuel Foote in a play A Trip to Calais, which, however, he was not allowed to produce. Chudleigh is also rumored to have inspired William Makepeace Thackeray's character of Beatrix Esmond, Baroness Bernstein, in The History of Henry Esmond and The Virginians.
