= Robert Walker (moderator) =

Church of Scotland minister and historian

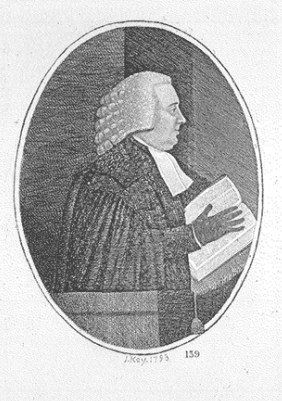
Rev Robert Walker of St Giles

Robert Walker (1716–1783) was a Church of Scotland minister and historian who served as Moderator of the General Assembly in 1771. His views were strongly Calvinistic.

== Life ==
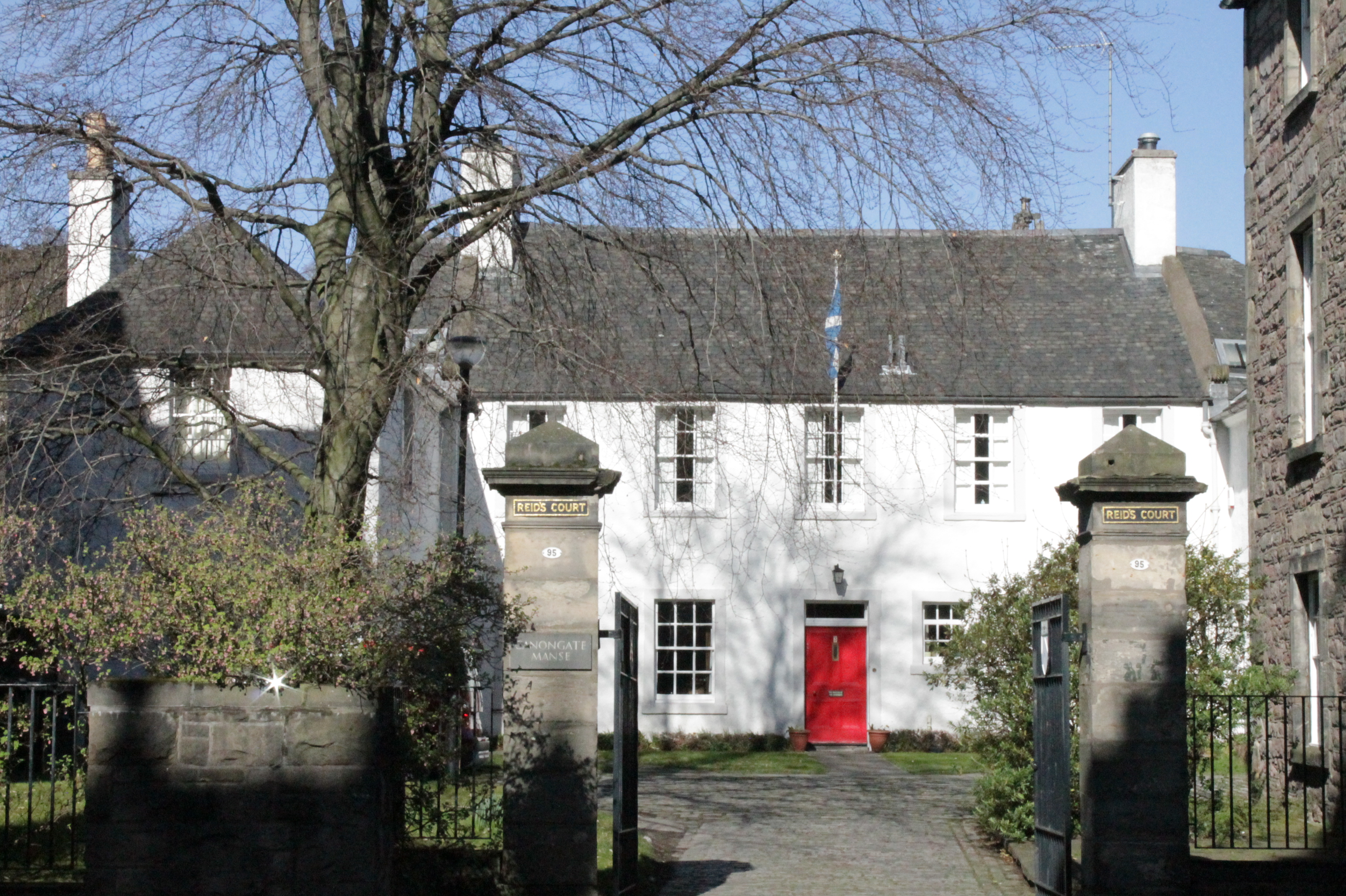
Canongate manse, Edinburgh

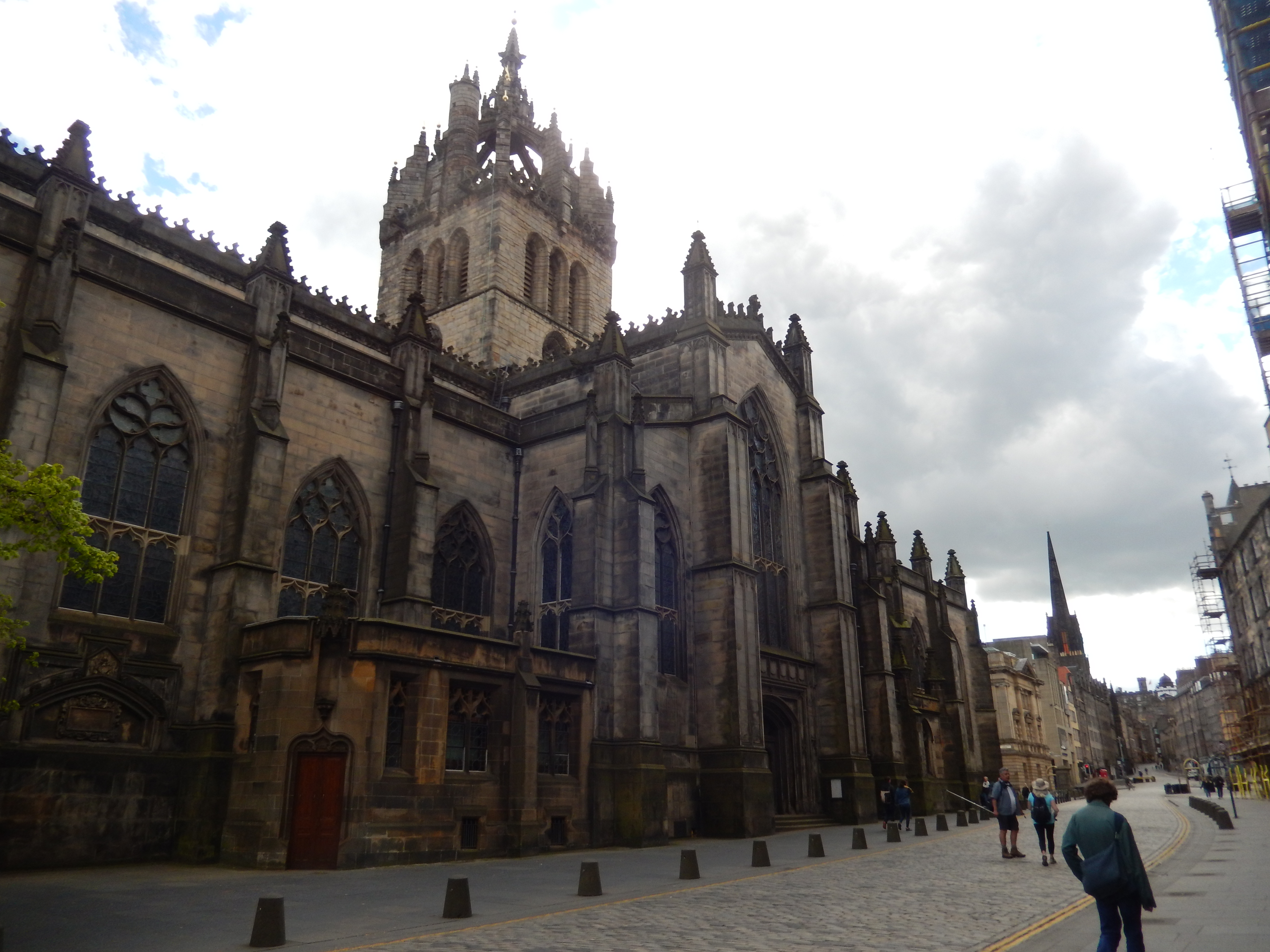
St. Giles' Cathedral

He was born in Canongate manse, the son of Rev John Walker, minister of the Canongate Kirk. He was educated at the High School in Edinburgh then studied at Edinburgh University.

He left Edinburgh and moved to Dumfriesshire for some years and in April 1737 he was licensed to preach by the Presbytery of Kirkcudbright, and ordained as minister of Straiton in September 1738. In November 1746 he translated back to Edinburgh as second charge of South Leith Parish Church in the harbour district. In October 1754 he translated to first charge of The High Kirk of St Giles, the country's most prestigious position.

At St Giles his second charge was Rev Hugh Blair and they became close friends. Walker took the larger but poorer congregation, Blair took the smaller but richer congregation.

In January 1757 (as widely instructed) he read the Assembly's condemnation of John Home's new play "Douglas" but then continued with a sermon looking broadly at theatrical productions, seeing theatre as having an important role in society. In 1770 a parallel even happened when Foote's "The Minor" was shown in Edinburgh to much concern.

In 1771 he succeeded Rev Alexander Carlyle of Inveresk as Moderator of the General Assembly of the Church of Scotland the highest position in the Scottish church.

In 1774 he is listed as living at Castlehill on the upper Royal Mile in Edinburgh. The house stood on the south side "opposite the water reservoir".

He was "seized with apoplexy" in 1782 and was thereon in poor health, but recovered sufficiently to continue preaching. He died on 3 April 1783 and the funeral service was overseen by his friend Rev Dr Hugh Blair and Rev Dr John Erskine of Greyfriars Kirk. Robert Walker is buried in Greyfriars Kirkyard.

== Family ==
In May 1747 he married Magdalen Dickson.

He was uncle of Rev Robert Walker, "the skating minister" of Canongate Kirk.

== Publications ==
- We Have Nothing Which we did not Receive
- Sermons on Practical Subjects
