= The Author (play) =

1757 comedy play by Samuel Foote

The Author is a comedy play by the British playwright Samuel Foote. It premiered on 5 February 1757, and was first published in that same year. In it, the impoverished poet, Cape, attempts to impress Arabella's brother Cadwallader in order to get his consent to marry her.

== Plot summary ==
=== Act One ===
Robin reports to Governor Cape that his deception to make the Governor's son think his father dead has succeeded, and the young man took the news solemnly. The Governor is preparing to test whether his son is worthy of his inheritance. They prepare to go see Young Cape, who is toiling in a print shop and trying to get rid of the Printer's Devil. The Devil pays him and leaves, and a Poet enters, looking for work. Cape shuts him out, bemoaning the poverty of poets, and his friend Sprightly arrives. Sprightly has invited Mr. Cadwallader, the brother of Cape's love, Arabella, to come meet him later. Mr. Vamp, the bookseller for whom Cape works, arrives, and Cape pretends that Sprightly is a sermon-writer. Vamp requests some pamphlets of Sprightly's be published. Arabella, along with Mr. and Mrs. Cadwallader arrive, and Cape pretends to be absorbed in writing, to impress them. Cadwallader asks Sprightly to invite him to the next dinner he has with an important person. Arabella warns Cape that her brother will have a hard time overlooking his poverty and obscure birth, and advises him to charm his wife, as a more certain way of gaining his favours. Mr. and Mrs. Cadwallader consult Cape on which school they should send their son to, Mr. Cadwallader saying that school is a very useful place to make acquaintances that might be useful in later life. Cape sides with Mrs. Cadwallader, and the couple invites him to dinner later that day. They leave, and the Governor (in disguise) arrives with Robin, who tries to hire Cape to write a letter praising the Governor—Cape refuses, saying that he can't since he isn't acquainted with the gentleman well enough. Sprightly has devised a plan to get Cadwallader out of the way for the evening, and when he returns he invites Cadwallader to dine with him and Robin, who he pretends to be “Prince Potowowski of the Tartarians”, with the Governor as his Interpreter.

=== Act Two ===
Mrs. Cadwallader is beating Cape at cards, and he suggests a game of Questions. Things escalate when the first question is “do you love me?”, and Mrs. Cadwallader misinterprets his playing along with her as Cape genuinely flirting. Arabella interrupts, and Mrs. Cadwallader goes to hide and observe the two. Arabella is affronted to have discovered Cape seemingly courting her sister-in-law when he said he loved her, which he reassures her of, which causes Mrs. Cadwallader to reveal herself. Mr. Cadwallader, along with Sprightly and the supposed foreigners, arrive, and Mrs. Cadwallader denounces Cape's impropriety to her husband. At length, she tells him the story, and Cadwallader becomes furious with Cape for making love to Arabella. He scoffs at the notion that he would ever consent to mix the pedigreed blood of the Cadwalladers with the lowness of Cape's poet origins. Then, the Governor speaks up, claiming Cape as his son, rebuking Cadwallader, and saying how proud he is to find Cape worthy of his inheritance.
