= The Lame Lover =

1770 play

- Original language: English
- Written by: Samuel Foote
- Genre: Comedy

Premiere
- Date: 22 June 1770
- Place: Haymarket Theatre, London

The Lame Lover is a 1770 comedy play by the British writer Samuel Foote. Foote wrote the play while he was recovering from the amputation of his leg, following a riding accident.

The original Haymarket cast starred Foote himself as Sir Luke Limp. The cast also included Thomas Robson as Colonel Secret, Thomas Weston as Jack and Sarah Gardner as Mrs Circuit.

== Bibliography ==
- Kelly, Ian. Mr Foote's Other Leg: Comedy, tragedy and murder in Georgian London. Pan Macmillan, 2012.
- Nicoll, Allardyce. A History of English Drama 1660–1900: Volume III. Cambridge University Press, 2009.
- Hogan, C. B. (ed.) The London Stage, 1660–1800: Volume V. Southern Illinois University Press, 1968.
