= Dormont de Belloy =

French dramatist and actor

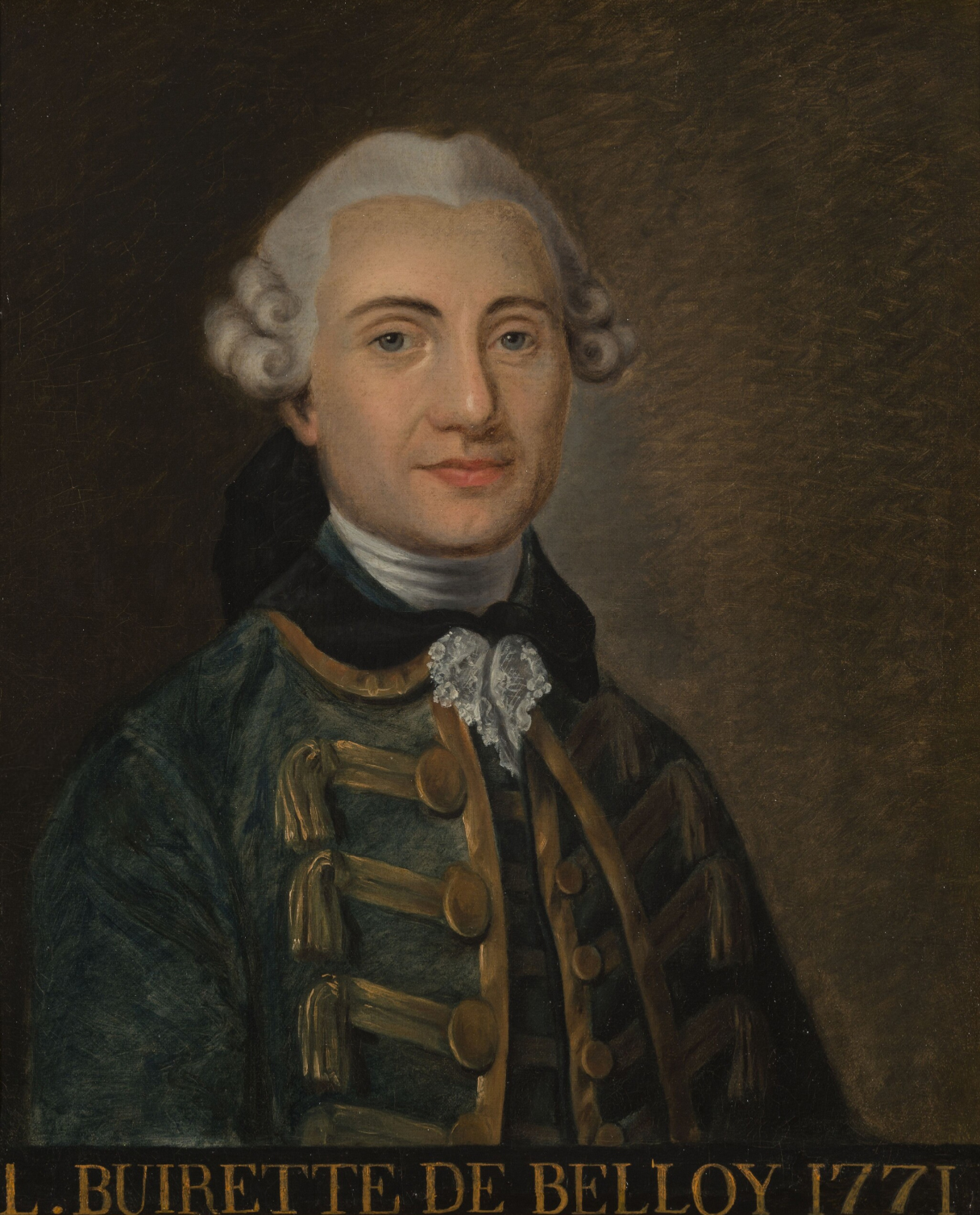
- Pierre-Laurent Buirette de Belloy (1771)
- Born: Pierre-Laurent Buirette de Belloy; 17 November 1727; Saint-Flour, Cantal
- Died: 5 March 1775 (aged 47)
- Occupations: Actor, playwright, dramatist

Pierre-Laurent Buirette de Belloy, known as Dormont de Belloy (17 November 1727 – 5 March 1775), was a French dramatist and actor.

== Life ==
De Belloy was born at Saint-Flour, Cantal, and, orphaned at a young age, was educated by his uncle, a distinguished advocate in Paris, for the bar. To escape from a profession he disliked he joined a troupe of comedians playing in the courts of the northern sovereigns. In 1758 the performance of his Titus, which had already been produced in Saint Petersburg, was postponed through his uncle's exertions; and when it did appear, a hostile cabal procured its failure, and it was not until after his guardians death that de Belloy returned to Paris with Zelmire (1762), a fantastic drama which met with great success, latter becoming an opera by Rossini. This was followed in 1765 by the patriotic play, Le Siège de Calais.

The humiliations undergone by France in the Seven Years' War assured a good reception for a play in which the devotion of Frenchmen redeemed disaster. The popular enthusiasm was unaffected by the judgment of calmer critics such as Diderot and Voltaire, who pointed out that the glorification of France was not best effected by a picture of defeat. De Belloy was admitted to the Académie Française in 1772 due to his activities as a playwright. He remains the only actor to have ever held a seat on the academy. His attempt to introduce national subjects into French drama deserves honor, but it must be confessed that his resources proved unequal to the task.

The Le Siège de Calais was followed by Gabrielle de Vergy (1770), Gaston di Bayard (1771), Pedro le cruel (1772). None of these attained the success of the earlier play, and de Belloy's death, which took place on 5 March 1775, is said to have been hastened by disappointment.

== Legacy ==
Gabrielle de Vergy enjoyed a strong afterlife, inspiring at least one verse drama, Percy by Hannah More (1777), as well as an opera, Gabriella di Vergy (1826-1838) by Gaetano Donizetti, from a libretto by Andrea Leone Tottola. Previous opera treatments of the same include those by Johann Simon Mayr (Raul di Créqui, Milan, 1809), Francesco Morlacchi (Raoul de Créqui, Dresden, 1811), Michele Carafa (1816), Carlo Coccia (Fayel, Florence, 1817). It was also used as Gabriella di Vergy by Saverio Mercadante in 1828.
