= Percy (play) =

1777 play

- Original language: English
- Written by: Hannah More
- Genre: Tragedy

Premiere
- Date: 10 December 1777
- Place: Covent Garden Theatre, London

Percy is a 1777 verse dama tragedy by the British writer Hannah More. It was inspired by the French play Gabrielle de Vergy by Pierre-Laurent Buirette de Belloy. The play premiered at the Covent Garden Theatre in London. The original cast included William Thomas Lewis as Percy, Francis Aickin as Earl Raby, Thomas Hull as Sir Hubert, John Whitfield as Edric, Thomas Robson as Harcourt, James Thompson as Servant, Richard Wroughton as Earl Douglas and Ann Street Barry as Elwina. David Garrick wrote both the prologue and epilogue.

The opening remarks read:

This tragedy, in which Mrs. Hannah More is supposed to have been assisted by Garrick, was produced at Covent Garden Theatre, in 1778, with success; and revived, in 1818, at the same Theatre. The feuds of the rival houses of Percy and of Douglas have furnished materials for this melancholy tale, in which Mrs. More has embodied many judicious sentiments and excellent passages, producing a forcible lesson to parental tyranny. The victim of her husband's unreasonable jealousy, Elwina's virtuous conflict is pathetic and interesting; while Percy's sufferings, and the vain regret of Earl Raby, excite and increase our sympathy.

== Bibliography ==
- Nicoll, Allardyce. A History of English Drama 1660–1900: Volume III. Cambridge University Press, 2009.
- Hogan, C.B (ed.) The London Stage, 1660–1800: Volume V. Southern Illinois University Press, 1968.
