= The Minor (Foote play) =

1760 play

The Minor is a comedy play by the British playwright Samuel Foote. It originally premiered at Dublin's Crow Street Theatre on 28 January 1760 and was first staged in London at the Haymarket Theatre on 28 July 1760. The play was a satire on George Whitefield.

Foote became manager of the Theatre Royal in Edinburgh in 1770 and his production again caused public rebuke. Rev Robert Walker of St Giles High Kirk spoke in its defence. However, Lord President Robert Dundas of Arniston described it as a "ludicrous epilogue".

== Bibliography ==
- Sherburne, George and Bond, Donald F. A Literary History of England, Volume III: The Restoration and Eighteenth Century. Routledge and Kegan Paul, 1967.
- Taylor, George (ed). Plays by Samuel Foote and Arthur Murphy. Cambridge University Press, 1984.
