= Jactitation =

False claim of being married to another

Jactitation or jactitation of marriage was an archaic cause of action in English and in Irish law. Where one person falsely asserted that he or she was married to another, the wronged party could obtain an order restraining further repetitions of the falsehood. The action was abolished in England in 1986 and in Ireland in 1995.

== Suit for jactitation of marriage ==
Where one person falsely asserted that he or she was married to another, the wronged party (the petitioner) could bring a suit for jactitation of marriage. The suit could be brought only against the person (the respondent) wrongfully claiming to be married, and could not be used to forbid third parties from alleging the existence of a marriage.

If the court found the case to be proven, it could issue a declaration that the two parties were not married, along with an order forbidding the respondent from repeating the assertion.

There were three defences to the suit:

- that an assertion of marriage was in fact never made
- that the assertion was true
- that the misrepresentation was acquiesced in by the petitioner

== Origins and history ==
According to the Oxford English Dictionary jactitation is "a false declaration tending to someone's detriment". The word, in the sense of "a public or open declaration, especially of a boastful sort; ostentatious affirmation; boasting, bragging" was first recorded in 1632. Legal proceedings for jactitation of marriage were recorded as having been brought before the Ecclesiastical courts in England in 1685.

Prior to the Clandestine Marriages Act 1753, which first made a formal ceremony of marriage compulsory, a suit for jactitation was the usual method of determining the validity of a marriage in England. After that date, the suit was much less used since proof of a formal ceremony was all that was needed to establish a marriage.

Before 1857 proceedings for jactitation in England took place only in the ecclesiastical courts, but the Matrimonial Causes Act 1857 transferred the jurisdiction to the newly created Court for Divorce and Matrimonial Causes. After 1925 the suit had to be instituted in a divorce County Court, with the case being transferred to the High Court if a defence was filed.

== Abolition ==
In 1971 the Law Commission reviewed the state of the law in England and recommended that the suit for jactitation of marriage should be abolished. It was by then little-used, with the last reported case being in 1968. The Commission noted in particular the suit's narrow scope and its inapplicability to false statements made by third parties. The right to petition for jactitation was ultimately abolished by section 61 of the Family Law Act 1986.

In the Republic of Ireland a Law Reform Commission report of 1983 recommended abolition of jactitation as "an ancient remedy which has fallen into complete disuse". The recommendation was implemented by the Family Law Act 1995, which instead empowered the Circuit Family Court to make a declaration about the status of a person's marriage.

== General and cited references ==
- Law Commission (England and Wales) (15 January 1971). Jactitation of Marriage (PDF) (Report). Consultation papers. BAILII.
- Law Reform Commission (Ireland) (1983). Report on restitution of conjugal rights, jactitation of marriage and related matters (Report). LRC reports 6. Dublin.
