= Alexander Carlyle =

Scottish church leader and autobiographer

Very Reverend Alexander Carlyle FRSE
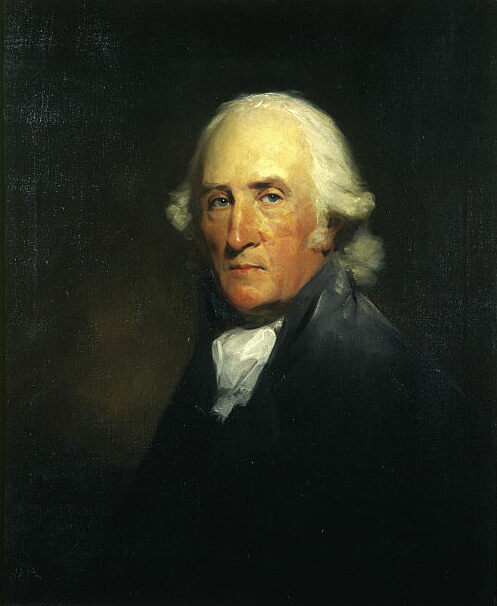
- Portrait of Rev. Alexander Carlyle, 1796, by Sir Henry Raeburn.
- Born: 26 January 1722; Cummertrees, Dumfriesshire
- Died: 28 August 1805 (aged 83)
- Education: University of Edinburgh; University of Glasgow; University of Leiden
- Occupations: Church leader, autobiographer

Alexander Carlyle (26 January 1722 – 28 August 1805) was a Scottish church leader, and autobiographer. He served as Moderator of the General Assembly of the Church of Scotland in 1770/71.

== Life ==
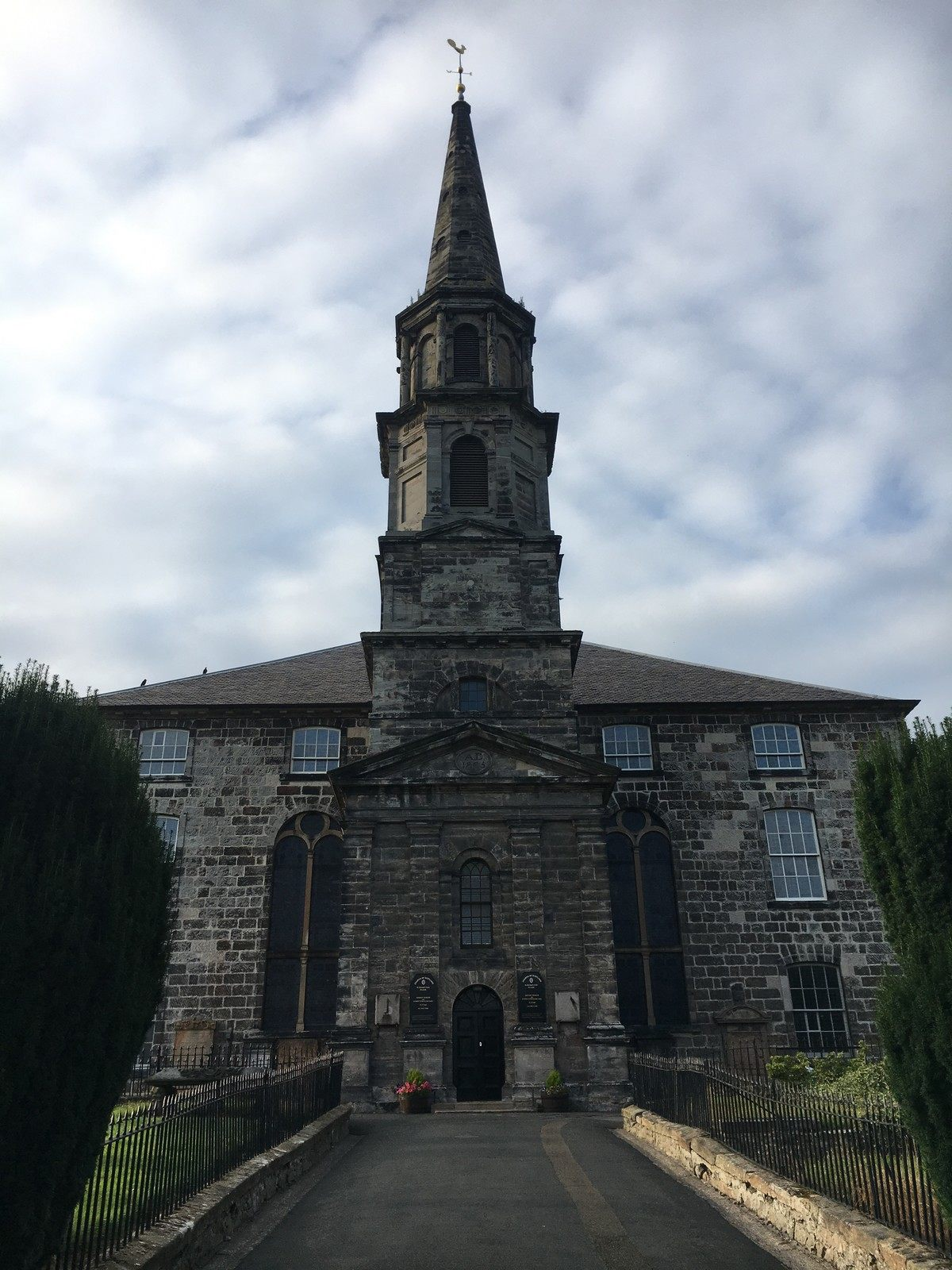
Inveresk Parish Church

He was born on 26 January 1722 in the manse at Cummertrees the son of Rev Willam Carlyle, the local minister. The family moved to Prestonpans in 1724. He was educated in Prestonpans then studied first at Edinburgh University then Glasgow before finalising his studies at Leyden University in the Netherlands which was famed for its teaching of Theology. He graduated MA from Edinburgh in 1743.

He was a witness to the aftermath of the Battle of Prestonpans in 1745 where he was part of the government militia, the Edinburgh Volunteers. He had spent the night in his father's nearby manse, but missed the battle itself as it was over by the time he got dressed. He went to the assistance of the wounded on the battlefield, and found the officers of the Highland army "gentleman-like and very civil.

He was licensed to preach as a Church of Scotland minister by the Presbytery of Prestonpans in July 1746. He was originally presented to the congregation of Cockburnspath but declined this role. In February 1748, under patronage of the Duke of Buccleuch, he was presented to the congregation of Inveresk and was formally ordained there in August 1748. From 1748, until his death he was minister at Inveresk in Midlothian (south west of Prestonpans).

In 1756 he incurred the anger of the Presbytery of Dalkeith and the General Assembly for his involvement in the editing of John Home's Douglas and in its theatre production in Edinburgh. He was present at its premiere on 15 December 1756.

During his long career he rose to high eminence in the Church of Scotland as leader of the moderate or "broad" Church section. This was recognised in an honorary Doctor of Divinity granted by King's College, Aberdeen in 1760. In 1770 he succeeded Rev James MacKnight as Moderator of the General Assembly of the Church of Scotland, being succeeded by Rev Robert Walker in 1771. In July 1785 he was made Dean of the Chapel Royal. In 1789 he was elected Principal Clerk of the General Assembly in opposition to Andrew Dalzell. He was associated with Principal Robertson as an ecclesiastical leader.

His strikingly ruddy complexion earned him the nickname of Jupiter Carlyle. His autobiography, which was edited by Hill Burton, and published 1860, though written in his closing years and not extending beyond the year 1770, is interesting as a picture of Scottish life, social and ecclesiastical, in the 18th century. Carlyle's autobiography recalled the Porteous Riots of 1736, and his friendship with Adam Smith, David Hume, Charles Townshend and John Home, the dramatist, for witnessing the performance of whose tragedy Douglas he was censured in 1757. He was also a member of The Select Society and of The Poker Club.

He was a founder member of the Royal Society of Edinburgh in November 1783.

He died on 25 August 1805 and was buried in Inveresk churchyard on 28 August.

== Family ==
In October 1760 Alexander married Mary Roddam (1743-1804) daughter of Robert Roddam of Heathpool in Northumberland.

Their three daughters and one son each died young. On death Carlyle bequeathed his belongings to his nephew, Carlyle Bell.

== Publications ==
- Reasons for applying to the King for Attgmentation of Stipend (Edinburgh, 1748)
- An Argument to prove that the Tragedy of "Douglas" ought to be Burnt by the Hands of the Hangman (Edinburgh, 1757)
- The question relating to a Scots militia considered (Edinburgh, 1760)
- Faction Detected (1763)
- Four single Sermons (Edinburgh, 1767–97)
- Auto-biography (Edinburgh, 1860; republished Edinburgh, 1910)
- Prologue to Herminius and Espasia (Edinburgh, 1754)
- Statistical Account of Inveresk

== Bibliography ==
- Dunbar Presb. Reg.
- Scots Mag., li., lxvii.
- Kay's Portr., ii.
- Cockburn's Mem.

== See also ==
- List of moderators of the General Assembly of the Church of Scotland
