= Mrs Gardner =

English actress and playwright

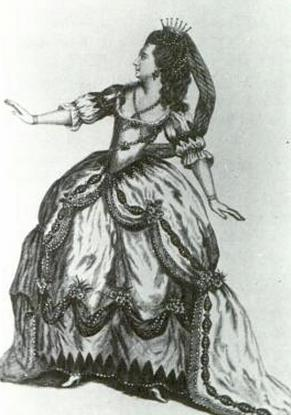
- as Lady Macbeth
- Occupations: actress and playwright
- Writing career
- Period: 18th century

Mrs Gardner or Sarah Cheney (fl. 1763–1795) was a British comedic actress and playwright.

== Life ==
Sarah Cheney first came to notice when she appeared at the Drury Lane Theatre in October 1763 in a play by William Congreve. She worked regularly, commanding two pounds a week, and, in 1765, she appeared in the first performance of Samuel Foote's play, The Commissary, at the Haymarket Theatre. That year, she met the actor William Gardner and they were married. The new couple took up roles in Foote's Company of Comedians. In the autumn, she was appearing as Mrs Gardner in the title role of Polly Honeycombe at Covent Garden with her new husband. Gardner moved in with Foote, as his housekeeper, at some point.

In the eleven years from 1766 to 1777, she appeared in comic roles for Foote but she had her best success in summer roles at the Haymarket, including The Nabob. It was said that her acting skills were less apparent after Foote died in 1777, and it was then that Gardner turned to playwriting. She wrote and appeared in The Advertisement, or, A Bold Stroke for a Husband at The Haymarket, but this was not acclaimed. In the same year, she separated from her husband and gained custody of their children. William Gardner went to work in numerous secondary roles and died in 1790 whilst his wife was abroad.

Gardner went to the Caribbean for four years and returned to act again in London before taking up work in Dublin. It was said that she arranged her own death and funeral to avoid paying debts. In 1789, she was appearing in New York having travelled there via Jamaica. In 1795, there was a benefit for her at The Haymarket after she had appeared there in her own play entitled Mrs Doggrell in her Attitudes, or, The Effects of a West India Ramble. Her death is unknown.
