= The Public Ledger =

Magazine

- Categories: Trade magazine
- Frequency: Weekly
- Founder: John Newbery
- Founded: 1760; 265 years ago
- Final issue: 2017; 8 years ago
- Company: Informa
- Country: United Kingdom
- Based in: London
- Language: English
- Website: www.public-ledger.com
- ISSN: 0048-5888

The Public Ledger was one of the world's longest continuously running commodity magazines. When established in 1760, it not only contained prices of commodities in London, but a wide variety of political, commercial and society news and commentary. It was established by John Newbery, who was better known for his pioneering children's literature. The Public Ledger was London's fourth daily newspaper in a golden age from 1730 to 1772 for 'Advertisers' – two-page advertising-driven newspapers set up after political parties withdrew subsidies to London newspapers.

In the late 20th century, it was bundled with other commodity publications before finally folding due to its outdated daily publication model.

== History ==
Most sources suggest The Public Ledger was first published on 11 January 1760, though some suggest 1759 and others 12 January 1760. Its founder, John Newbery, son of a farmer in Berkshire, took an apprenticeship with William Carnan in Reading, inheriting the business after his mentor's death. He moved to London in 1743, setting up a shop called the Bible and Sun at 65 St. Paul's Churchyard, from where he published religious and children's books and The Public Ledger. In 18th Century England it was common for political parties to hold sway over (and even subsidise) newspapers. As this trend waned, The Public Ledger took on the mantra "Open to All Parties, Influenced by None". Until roughly 1774 it was viewed as an official organ; after this it was viewed as an opposition paper.

Between 1756 and 1780, Anglo-Irish journalist Charlotte Forman – one of the few women of the period to take up the profession – wrote for the Public Ledger.

From the 1830s onwards it principally carried commercial news and opinions, and by the 20th century solely commodities information.

In 2012, a significant redesign saw the traditional 250-year-old Gothic masthead replaced with a modern alternative.

In 2017, The Public Ledger was combined with sister publications Foodnews and Dairy Markets to form the IEG Vu online terminal. Users of the new website were requested to manually add commodities to recreate the data of The Public Ledger. In 2020, IEG Vu was folded into IHS Markit, a brand of S&P Global.

== Personnel ==
In January 2014, staff included Emile Mehmet (managing editor), Sandra Boga (deputy editor), Sabine Crook (senior market reporter), Julian Gale (contributor and formerly deputy editor of the publication before his transfer to the sister title Foodnews) Matthew Pendered (senior prices analyst) and Mike Moss (data analyst). A number of freelance staff and pooled analysts are also employed around the world.

== Former personnel ==
Oliver Goldsmith was known to have written for The Public Ledger, including most famously the Chinese Letters where he poses as a traveller from China to comment on Western behaviour and values. He also mentions "The Ledger" in his novel The Vicar of Wakefield.

Reverend William Jackson, a noted Irish preacher, journalist, playwright, radical and spy, was editor in 1766, while the Irish political informant Leonard McNally held the position in the 1780s. Hugh Kelly, an Irish dramatist and poet, held the post before his death in 1777 and Alexander Chalmers did so some time after 1777.
