= A Trip to Calais =

1778 comedy play by Samuel Foote

A Trip to Calais is a comedy play by the British playwright Samuel Foote. It was first published in 1778, along with the censored version entitled The Capuchin, which was first performed in 1776. In the original, Jenny Minnikin and Dick Drugget elope to France, followed closely by the Minnikin parents, Jenny's suitor Codling, and her aunt Mrs. Clack. To escape the family, Jenny temporarily enters a nunnery. Later, they meet Lady Kitty Crocodile, who encourages Jenny to be bigamous. Lady Kitty's servant Miss Lydell marries her worthy lover Colonel Crosby.

== Plot summary ==
The following is a summary of the plot of A Trip to Calais.

=== Act One ===
Dick Drugget and Jenny Minnikin are eloping in France (parody of Richard Brinsley Sheridan and Elizabeth Linley). They must find a priest to marry them, and ask Tromfort, the French innkeeper, where one might be found. We learn that Jenny's father is a London pin-maker, and that he intends to choose her husband, while Dick is his assistant. Jenny once ran off with her dancing-master. Tromfort recommends a doctor to marry them, but he is absent. A boat arrives from Dover, and Dick departs to see if it is Jenny's father. Tromfort flirts with Jenny. The family has arrived; to prevent the lovers’ separation, Tromfort will place Jenny in a Catholic convent, while Dick will wait in Boulogne or Dunkirk. Jenny departs with La Jeunesse, Tromfort's wife. Jenny's father's preferred suitor, Kit Codling, arrives with Jenny's parents and Jenny's aunt Mrs Clack, a social-climbing mantua-maker. The family comments on French gentility. Two neighbours from London, Mr. Gingham and Luke Lapelle, enter, and they discuss their experiences in France. In order to be fashionable, Luke travels with his wife, but calls her his mistress.

=== Act Two ===
The Minnikins and Mrs. Clack are astounded by Jenny's sudden ambition to become a nun. Codling tries to speak with her, but is rebuffed by the nuns. Father O’Donnovan, an Irish capuchin in the town, seems sympathetic initially, but refuses to remove Jenny from the convent until the Minnikins bribe him. O’Donnovan tells stories to the gullible Minnikins of Englishmen who have evaded the law and have come to France. The most infamous is the Lady Kitty Crocodile, who has come to France after her husband's death. O’Donnovan leaves. Jenny and the Abbess debate the former's taking the veil: Jenny wishes to return to the world, but the Abbess urges her to accept Christ as her spouse. Upon realizing that Jenny will bring no fortune to the convent, however, the Abbess quickly abandons her argument. Mr. and Mrs. Minnikin (and Codling, hidden) come to the Abbey's gate to speak with Jenny. The Abbess counsels Jenny to pretend that she is waiting for divine revelation before she can make a decision about whether to stay in the convent. The Abbess tells Jenny's parents that Jenny has chosen to marry St. Francis. Believing St. Francis is a real suitor, and furious at Jenny's treachery, Mr. and Mrs. Minnikin depart, calling the Abbess a bawd. The Minnikins depart to visit Lady Crocodile. Miss Lydell and Miss Hetty are in deep debate at Kitty Crocodile's. Lady Crocodile enters, and dismisses Hetty in a fit of rage. She accuses Miss Lydell, a maid in waiting, of flirting with many foreign acquaintances. Colonel Crosby enters, and finds Miss Lydell in tears. Hetty announces the Minnikin's and Mrs. Clack's arrival.

=== Act Three ===
Hetty and Colonel Crosby talk; Crosby is in love with Miss Lydell. Mrs. Clack, formerly Lady Crocodile's mantua-maker, arrives to find this august lady in deepest mourning. They discuss Sir John, Lady Crocodile's deceased husband, and she faints when Mrs. Clack suggests taking another husband. When Lady Crocodile has been revived, Mrs. Clack asks for her help in removing Jenny from the convent; Lady Crocodile claims her hands are tied because of her personal friendship with the Pope. After they exit the room, Colonel Crosby emerges from a hiding place, calling Lady Crocodile an “Ephesian Matron”, and expressing his intentions to pursue Miss Lydell to her friend Hetty. Jenny arrives at her parents’ apartment, surrounded by guards. Lady Crocodile arrives, but Minnikin's account of the story is consistently interrupted by Luke Lapelle. Lady Crocodile speaks to Jenny alone; the latter confesses that the convent is just part of the plot to avoid marriage to Codling. Lady Kitty recommends marrying both Dick Drugget and Kit Codling. Jenny is excited by the prospect. Colonel Crosby and Miss Lydell appear and announce their intentions to return to England. Hetty has the last word: Jenny and Lady Crocodile are well matched, and Miss Lydell need feel no regret on leaving Jenny entrapped by the “galling yoke of a capricious and whimsical tyrant!”

== Differences between A Trip to Calais and The Capuchin ==
Several characters that don't exist in the original replace others in the later version, including Dr. Viper, a Protestant priest working for Lady Deborah Dripping, and a villainous co-conspirator to O'Donnovan, as well as Sir Harry Hemper, and Peter Packthread, who replace Mr. Gingham and Luke Lapelle from the original. As the title suggests, Father O'Donnovan also features more heavily in the later version, while Lady Kitty Crocodile is removed entirely.

=== Act Three ===
The third act of The Capuchin was a complete overhaul of the original third act of A Trip to Calais.
