= Samuel Foote =

British actor and playwright (1720–1777)

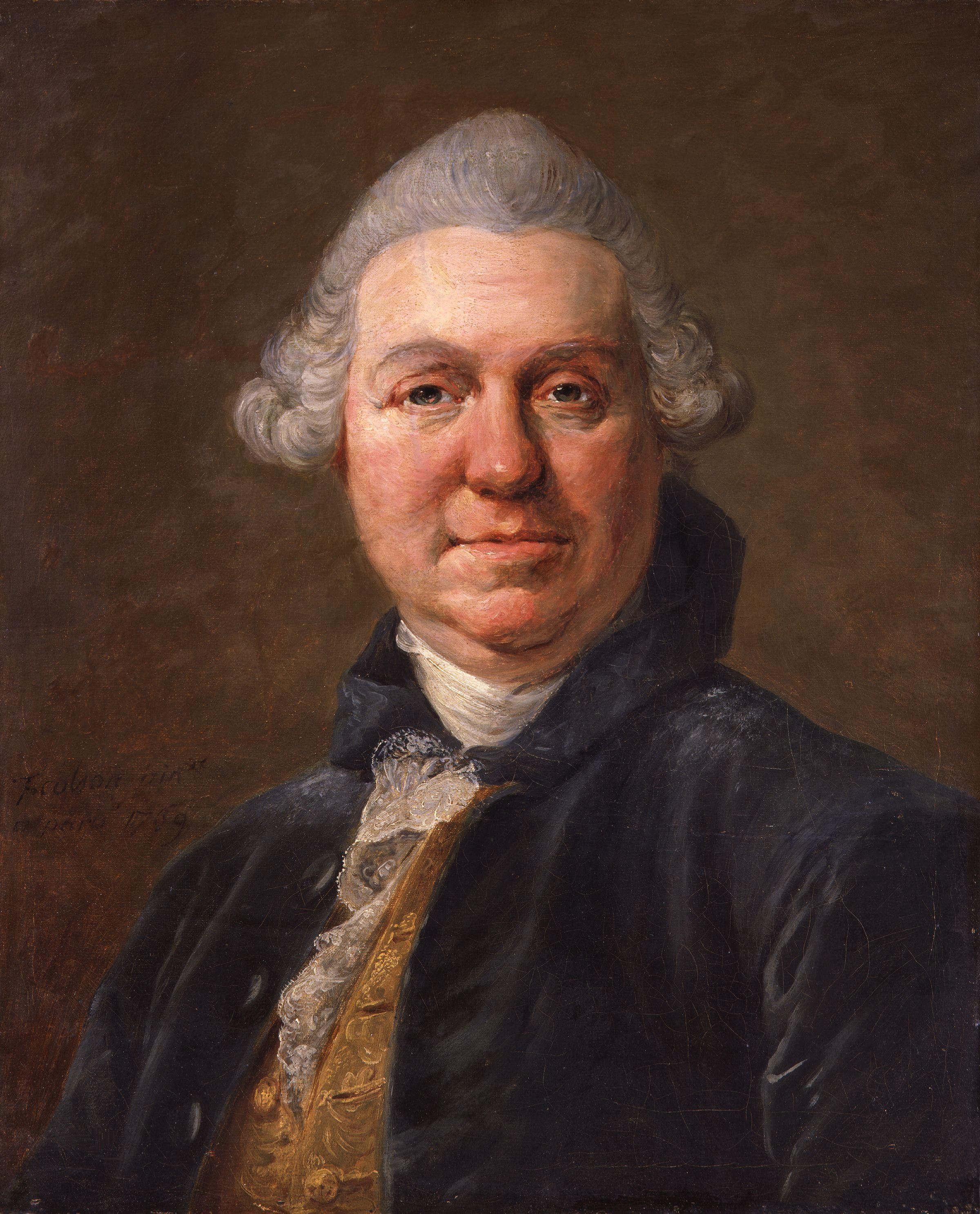
- Foote by Jean-Francois Colson, 1769
- Born: January 1720
- Died: 21 October 1777 (aged 57); Dover, England, Great Britain
- Notable work: The Author; The Minor; The Lame Lover
- Relatives: Edward Goodere (maternal grandfather); Samuel Goodere (uncle); John Goodere (uncle)

Samuel Foote (January 1720 – 21 October 1777) was a Cornish dramatist, actor and theatre manager. He was known for his comedic acting and writing, and for turning the loss of a leg in a riding accident in 1766 to comedic opportunity.

== Early life ==
Born into a well-to-do family, Foote was baptised in Truro, Cornwall, on 27 January 1720. His father, Samuel Foote, held several public positions, including mayor of Truro, Member of Parliament representing Tiverton and a commissioner in the Prize Office. His mother, née Eleanor Goodere, was the daughter of Sir Edward Goodere Baronet of Hereford. Foote may have inherited his wit and sharp humour from her and her family which was described as "eccentric ... whose peculiarities ranged from the harmless to the malevolent." About the time Foote came of age, he inherited his first fortune when one of his uncles, Sir John Dineley Goodere, 2nd Baronet, was murdered by another uncle, Captain Samuel Goodere. This murder was the subject of his first pamphlet, which he published around 1741.

Foote was educated at Truro Grammar School, the collegiate school at Worcester, and at Worcester College, Oxford, distinguishing himself in these places by mimicry and audacious pleasantries of all kinds. An undisciplined student, he frequently was absent from his Greek and Latin classes and subsequently, Oxford expelled him on 28 January 1740. Although he left Oxford without receiving his degree, he acquired a classical training which afterwards enabled him to easily turn a classical quotation or allusion, and helped to give to his prose style a certain fluency and elegance.

Foote was destined for the law, but certainly not by nature. In his chambers at the Inner Temple, and in the Grecian Coffee House nearby, he came to know something of lawyers if not of law, and was afterwards able to jest at the jargon and to mimic the mannerisms of the bar, and to satirise the Latitats of the other branch of the profession with particular success. Though he never applied himself to his studies at the Inner Temple, he well applied himself to spending money and living as a bon vivant, which led to his quickly running out of funds.

After finding himself in debt, Foote married a certain Mary Hickes (or Hicks) on 10 January 1741. With his wife also came a sizable dowry. Contemporaries note that Foote mistreated his wife, deserting her when his financial situation improved and Hickes may have died an early death. But a stronger attraction drew him to the Bedford Coffee-house in Covent Garden and to the theatrical world of which it was the social centre. His extravagant living soon forced him into debtor's prison in 1742, and friends encouraged Foote's going onto the stage to make a living.

== Initial theatrical ventures ==
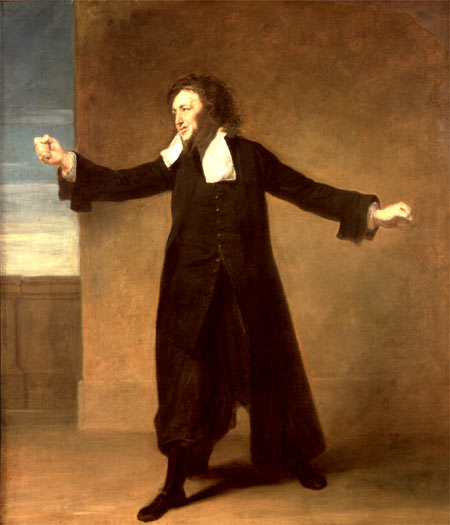
Charles Macklin as Shylock by Johann Zoffany

Foote's first training for the stage came under the tutelage of Charles Macklin. By 1744, when they appeared onstage together, Macklin had made a name for himself as one of the most notable actors on the British stage, after David Garrick. His appearance as Shylock in Shakespeare's The Merchant of Venice at the Drury Lane Theatre in 1741, mesmerized London audiences. Dismissing the conventional comedic approach to the character, Macklin played the character as consummately evil. Following his debut, George II reportedly could not sleep, while Georg Lichtenberg described Macklin's interpretation of Shylock's first line—"Three thousand ducats"—as being uttered "as lickerously as if he were savouring the ducats and all they would buy." Following less than a year of training, Foote appeared opposite Macklin's Iago as the titular role in Shakespeare's Othello at the Haymarket Theatre, 6 February 1744. While his first appearance was unsuccessful, it is noted that this production was produced illegally under the Licensing Act 1737 which forbade the production of plays by theatres not holding letters patent or the production of plays not approved by the Lord Chamberlain. In order to skirt this law, the Haymarket Theatre held musical concerts with plays included gratis.

Following his unsuccessful London appearance, Foote spent the summer season in Dublin at the Theatre Royal, Smock Alley, where he found his first success. Returning to England, he joined the company at the Theatre Royal, Drury Lane, which at that time included such noted actors as Peg Woffington, David Garrick and Spranger Barry. There he played comic roles including Harry Wildair in Farquhar's The Constant Couple, Lord Foppington in Vanbrugh's The Relapse and most notably, the playwright, Bayes in Villiers' The Rehearsal. It was in this role that Foote publicly showed his gift of mimicry. Borrowing from David Garrick's interpretation of the role, Foote used this role to mock many leading contemporaries.

== The Haymarket Theatre ==
Even with his success onstage, Foote remained impoverished. Attempting life as a theatre manager, he secured a lease on the Haymarket Theatre in 1746. Foote began writing in earnest, producing two pamphlets, A Treatise on the Passions and The Roman and English Comedy Considered. After illegally producing Othello, Foote opened one of his own plays, The Diversions of the Morning or, A Dish of Chocolate, a satire on contemporary actors and public figures performed by himself, on 22 April 1747. The Dish of Chocolate of the title referred to a dish or tea offered by Foote to accompany the musical entertainment while the performance was offered gratis, all done to avoid the Licensing Act. On the morning following the performance, the theatre was locked and audiences gathering for the noon performance (another gimmick to evade the law was to stage the show as a matinée) were turned away by authorities. Foote's jabs at other actors brought the ire of many at Drury Lane and the managers took steps to protect their patent.

Fortunately for Foote, some highly placed friends at court helped the theatre reopen and the play continued. In June, Foote offered A Cup of Tea, a revision of his revue, Diversions, again in the guise of a culinary offering. After a brief trip to Paris, Foote opened The Auction of Pictures which satirized satirist Henry Fielding. A war of wit was launched with each lambasting the other in ink and onstage. Among the verbal missiles hurled, Fielding denounced Foote in The Jacobite's Journal saying "you Samuel Fut [sic] be pissed upon, with Scorn and Contempt, as a low Buffoon; and I do, with the utmost Scorn and Contempt, piss on you accordingly."

== The Author himself ==
The Fielding quarrel was followed by a more serious quarrel with actor Henry Woodward. This resulted in a small riot that was damaging not only to the Haymarket Theatre but to Foote's reputation. He began to deflect criticism only with the opening of his play, The Knights. This play, unlike his earlier satirical revues, was a romantic comedy set in the country, though he did use this play as a vehicle to satirize such things as Italian opera and the gentry of Cornwall.

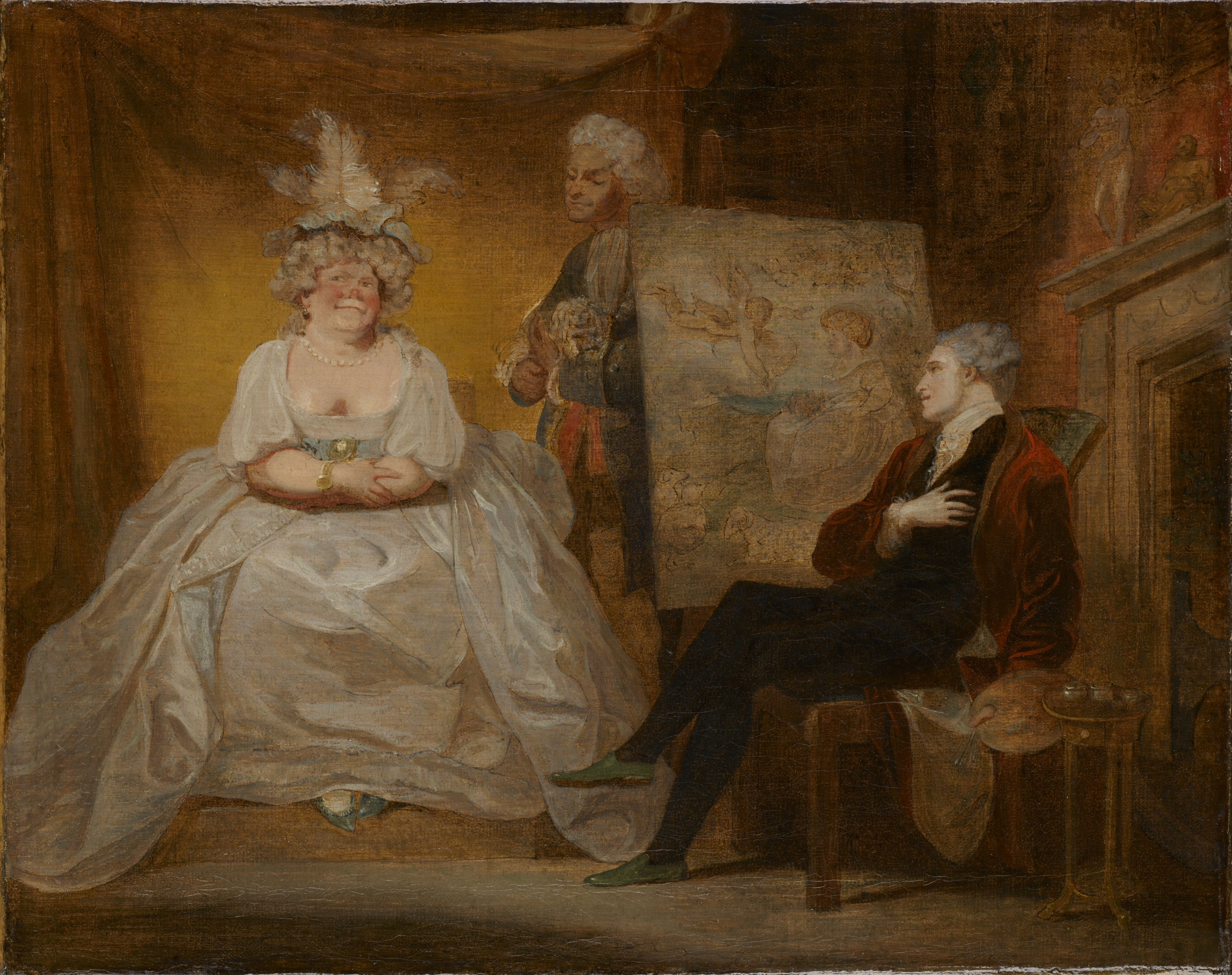
Scene from Taste in a painting by Robert Smirke. Lady Pentweazel, played by Foote, wore a large headdress, satirizing the elaborate headdresses of the day, with feathers that fell out throughout the play.

At the close of the Haymarket season in 1749, Foote left London for Paris in order to spend money he had recently inherited. Upon his return to London in 1752, Foote's new comedy, Taste, was produced at Drury Lane. Foote took aim at the burgeoning art and antiquities market and particularly aristocratic collectors. In his preface to the play, Foote specifies his targets as the "barbarians who have prostituted the study of antiquity to trifling superficiality, who have blasted the progress of the elegant arts by unpardonable frauds and absurd prejudices, and who have vitiated the minds and morals of youth by persuading them that what serves only to illustrate literature is true knowledge and that active idelness is real business."

Taste opens with Lady Pentweazel who believes that the works of art, the Venus de' Medici and the Mary de Medici, are sisters in the Medici family. Two other collectors, Novice and Lord Dupe, claim to be able to determine the age and value of coins and medals by tasting them while Puff, an auctioneer, convinces them and Sir Positive Bubble that broken china and statuary are worth far more than perfect pieces. Lord Dupe follows this advice by purchasing a canvas with the paint scraped off. The foibles of ignorant art collectors and predatory dealers were presented by Foote in this high burlesque comedy. In order for an audience to appreciate high burlesque, they must understand the standards of true taste before they can recognize the conflict between those standards and the characters' standards. The audience that saw the premier of Taste evidently did not understand this conflict as the play was not successful and played only five performances.

Following the unsuccessful reception of Taste, Foote staged a new production, An Englishman in Paris, inspired by both his trip there and possibly, as Davison suggests, a French play, Frenchman in London which he may have seen. Here, Foote satirized the boorish behaviour of English gentlemen abroad. The play garnered wide acclaim and became a part of the repertoires of the Drury Lane and Covent Garden theatres where it remained for a few decades. While his success was becoming more solidified as a writer, Foote was also in demand as an actor, working at Drury Lane and Covent Garden during the 1753–4 season.

When he found himself out of work in November 1754, Foote rented the Haymarket theatre and began to stage mock lectures. Satirizing Charles Macklin's newly opened school of oratory, these lectures created a sort of theatrical war, especially when Macklin began to appear at the lectures himself. At one particular lecture, Foote extemporized a piece of nonsense prose to test Macklin's assertion that he could memorise any text at a single reading.

So she went into the garden to cut a cabbage-leaf to make an apple-pie; and at the same time a great she-bear, coming up the street, pops its head into the shop. "What! No soap?" So he died, and she very imprudently married the barber; and there were present the Picninnies, and the Joblillies, and the Garyulies, and the grand Panjandrum himself, with the little round button at top, and they all fell to playing the game of catch-as-catch-can till the gunpowder ran out at the heels of their boots.

This introduced the nonsense term "The Grand Panjandrum" into the English language and the name was adopted for the Panjandrum or Great Panjandrum, an experimental World War II-era explosive device.

With Foote's success in writing An Englishman in Paris, Irish playwright Arthur Murphy was moved to create a sequel, The Englishman returned from Paris. While Foote readily encouraged Murphy's plan, Foote secretly wrote his own version which opened at Covent Garden on 3 February 1756. While early biographers scorned Foote's plagiarism of Murphy's play, the 1969 discovery of that manuscript laid it to rest when it was proven that Foote's play was far superior. The play was successful at Covent Garden and played regularly until 1760.

Two rival actresses captured the attention of London audiences and Foote's satire. Peg Woffington and George Anne Bellamy apparently took their roles rather seriously in a production of Nathaniel Lee's The Rival Queens. When Bellamy's Parisian fashions began to upstage Woffington, Bellamy was driven offstage by a dagger-wielding Woffington thus providing a source for Foote's The Green-Room Squabble or a Battle Royal between the Queen of Babylon and the Daughter of Darius. The text of this farce is now lost.

Having turned his satire on Englishmen abroad and actresses at home, Foote pointed his daggered pen towards himself, other writers and the condition of the "starving writer" in his play The Author which premiered at Drury Lane on 5 February 1757. The plot concerned a poor author's father who disguises himself in order to spy on his son. Again, Foote created the role of Cadwallader for himself and used it to satirize John Apreece, a patron of authors. While critics derided Foote's attack on Apreece, audiences flocked to the theatre. Apreece even appeared and sat "open-mouthed and silly, in the boxes, to the delight of the audience, and mystified by the reflection of himself, which he beheld on the stage." Foote noted later that Apreece finding "the resemblance [...] too strong, and the ridicule too pungent [...] occasioned an application for the suppression of the piece, which was therefore forbidden to be anymore performed." The play was forbidden further productions by the Lord Chamberlain. While success may have been limited, Richard Brinsley Sheridan adapted the plot in his School for Scandal. Modern critics would point out that The Author shows great development in Foote's ability in creating characters and sustaining plot.

== Of mimicry and Methodists ==
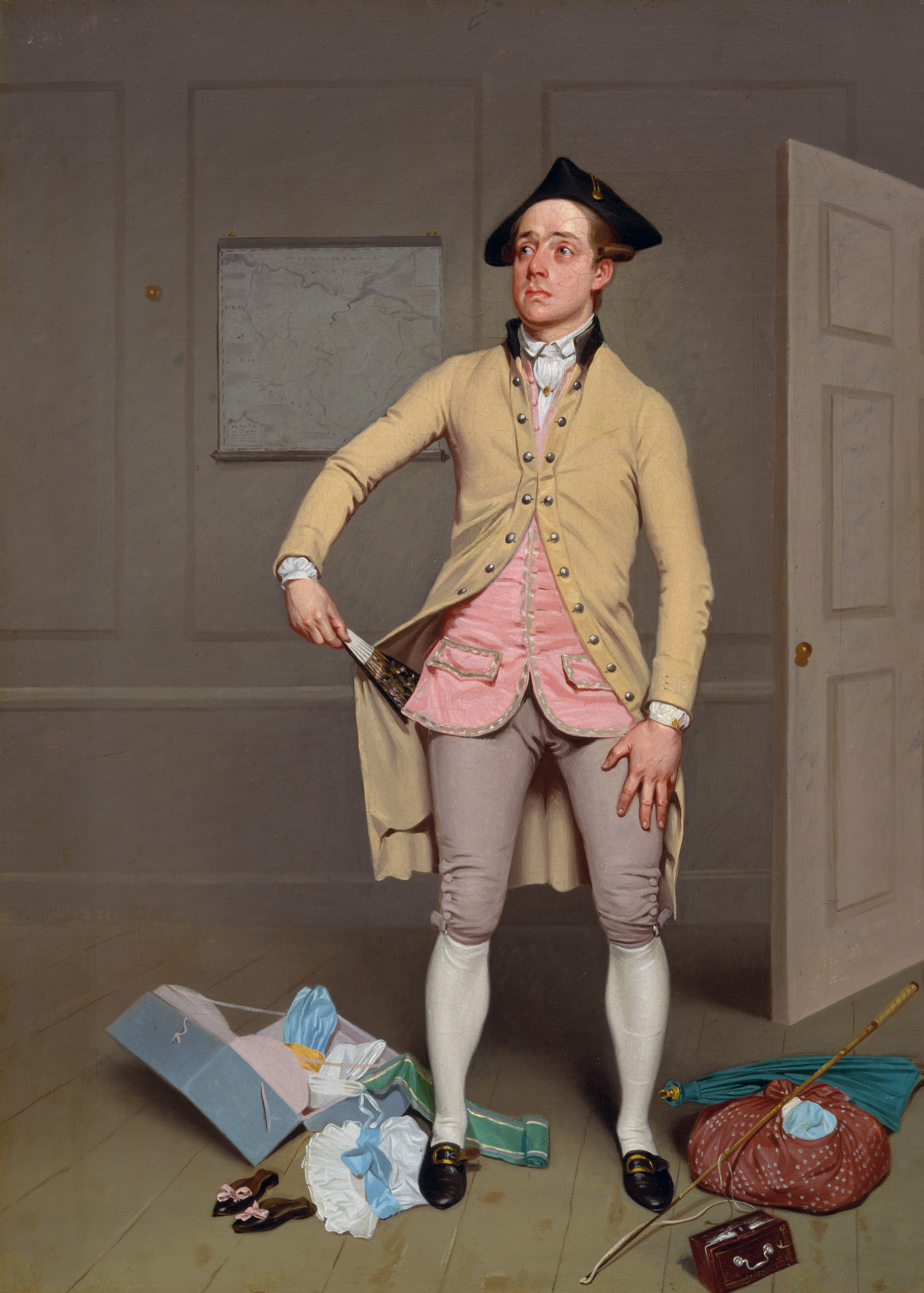
'Jerry Sneak' in The Mayor of Garratt. Painting by Samuel De Wilde in the Yale Center for British Art

Late in 1757, Foote faced himself in the guise of young actor and mimic, Tate Wilkinson. Wilkinson, like Foote, had failed somewhat as an actor, but was renowned for his satiric mimicry of others. Foote traveled with him to Dublin for part of the 1757–58 season and he also revived Diversions of the Morning as a vehicle to display Wilkinson's talents. The popularity of these talents crowded out all other performances at Drury Lane in the first half of the season, much to the chagrin of Garrick and the other actors. Soon, however, the luck ran out and by March, Foote was seeking employment elsewhere. With little luck in London, Foote traveled to perform a season in Edinburgh and found success with many of his works, including The Author which could not be staged in London. The following season found Foote in Dublin where Wilkinson was drawing crowds with his imitations and on 28 January 1760, Foote opened a new play, The Minor. The production was a failure.

Returning to London, Foote's financial situation was still quite poor. After renting the Haymarket theatre and revising The Minor into a three-act version (up from the two-act version presented in Dublin), the play opened in London. Doran remarks that while "The Minor failed in Dublin, very much to the credit of an Irish audience, [...] they condemned it on the ground of its grossness and immorality[,]" English society, nevertheless, while hearing condemnations of the play, filled the theatres. The play played for full houses for 38 nights.

The Minor utilizes a fairly pedestrian plot to satirize the Methodist movement. Before its premiere, Foote showed the text of The Minor to the Archbishop of Canterbury, Thomas Secker. Secker objected to several passages, but particularly to Mrs Cole referring to herself as a "lost sheep". This expression, he said, was sacred to the pulpit. Foote besought the archbishop to take the manuscript and strike the exceptionable passages; he agreed on the condition that it should be published "Revised and Corrected by the Archbishop of Canterbury."

== Later life ==
While riding with Prince Edward, Duke of York and Albany, in 1766, he was thrown from his horse and the injury cost him his leg. Even in this state, he continued to act and as possible compensation for his injury was granted a license to legally operate the Haymarket Theatre. He produced a summer season of "legitimate plays" in 1767, engaging Spranger Barry and his wife to perform. He bought the theatre outright and remodelled the interior the same year and continued to operate the theatre until he was forced to give up his patent to George Colman the Elder the following year. Near London, Foote lived and wrote in his much loved villa, 'The Hermitage', in North End village in the parish of Fulham. He died on 21 October 1777 in Dover, while en route to France.

One play, The Cozeners, is clearly based on the politician Charles James Fox who was a spendthrift and gambler. He had been duped by Elizabeth Harriett Grieve who had promised that she could arrange for him to marry a West Indian heiress. Grieve was tried and transported in 1773 and in the following year The Cozeners opened with Mrs Gardner in the part of Mrs Fleece'em. Foote's satires are based on caricatures of characters and situations from his era. His facility and wit in writing these earned him the title "the English Aristophanes." While his subjects could find his literary jabs just as humorous as his audiences, they often both feared and admired him.

== Legal troubles ==
In 1774, the Duke of Kingston's sister was able to invalidate the Duke's will, on the grounds that his widow, Elizabeth Chudleigh, was guilty of bigamy. Foote picked up this news and began work on a new play in which the character "Lady Kitty Crockodile" was clearly based on Chudleigh. In response a supporter of Chudleigh's, William Jackson, in 1775 began publishing in The Public Ledger veiled accusations of homosexuality. Not long after Chudleigh was convicted of bigamy in spring 1776, Foote's coachman accused Foote of sexual assault, leading to a trial at which Foote was eventually acquitted. In the interim, the Ledger filled its pages with the story, and an anonymous pamphlet (likely written by Jackson) aimed at Foote, "Sodom and Onan", appeared. The work was subtitled "A Satire Inscrib'd to [ – – ] Esqr, alias the Devil upon Two Sticks", with the blank filled by an engraving of a foot. Inevitably, these events provided more fodder for Foote's pen, with Jackson making a disguised appearance in The Capuchin.

== Mentions of Foote ==
In William Makepeace Thackeray's 1844 novel The Luck of Barry Lyndon, which was later published as Barry Lyndon; The Memoirs of Barry Lyndon, Esq. the protagonist claims Foote as a friend. Foote is also referred to in The Brothers Boswell by Philip Baruth.

== Dramatic works ==
Title	Year of Premiere	Location of Premiere	Year Published
The Diversions of the Morning or, A Dish of Chocolate (revised as A Cup of Tea)	1747	Haymarket	----
An Auction of Pictures	1748	Haymarket	----
The Knights	1748	Drury Lane	1754
Taste	1752	Drury Lane	1752
An Englishman in Paris	1753	Covent Garden	1753
A Writ of Inquiry on the Inquisitor General	1754	Haymarket	----
The Englishman Returned from Paris	1756	Covent Garden	1756
The Green-Room Squabble or a Battle Royal between the Queen of Babylon and the Daughter of Darius	1756	Haymarket	Lost
The Author	1757	Drury Lane	1757
The Minor	1760	Haymarket	1760
Tragedy a la Mode (alternative act 2 for Diversions)	1760	Drury Lane	1795
The Lyar	1762	Covent Garden	1764
The Orators	1762	Haymarket	1762
The Mayor of Garratt	1763	Haymarket	1764
The Trial of Samuel Foote, Esq. for a Libel on Peter Paragraph	1763	Haymarket	1795
The Patron	1764	Haymarket	1764
The Commissary	1765	Haymarket	1765
The Devil upon Two Sticks	1768	Haymarket	1778
The Lame Lover	1770	Haymarket	1771
The Maid of Bath	1771	Haymarket	1771
The Nabob	1772	Haymarket	1778
Piety in Pattens	1773	Haymarket	1973
The Bankrupt	1773	Haymarket	1776
The Cozeners	1774	Haymarket	1776
A Trip to Calais (revised as The Capuchin)	1776	Haymarket	1778

== Books ==
- Cooke, William. Memoirs of Samuel Foote, Esq: With a Collection of His Genuine Bon-mots, Anecdotes, Opinions, &c 1805. (Online.)
- Foote, Samuel. The Dramatic Works of Samuel Foote, Esq.; to which is prefaced A Life of the Author. London, 1809. Reprinted by Benjamin Bloom, Bronx, New York.
- Kelly, Ian. Mr Foote's Other Leg: Comedy, tragedy and murder in Georgian London, 2012. Picador; later adapted as a play under the same title
