= Robert Lee, Lord Lee =

Scottish lawyer and judge

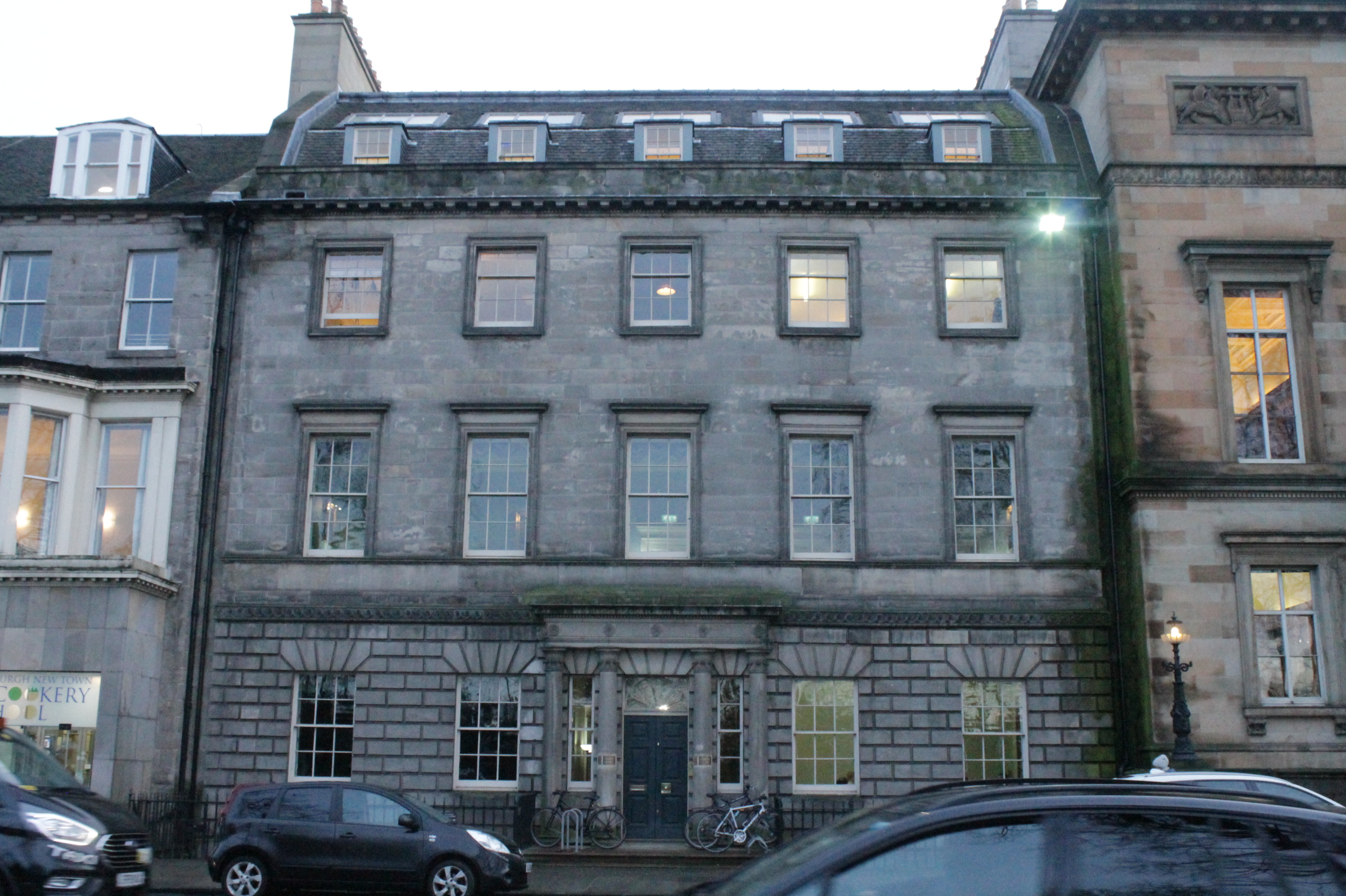
8 Queen Street, Edinburgh

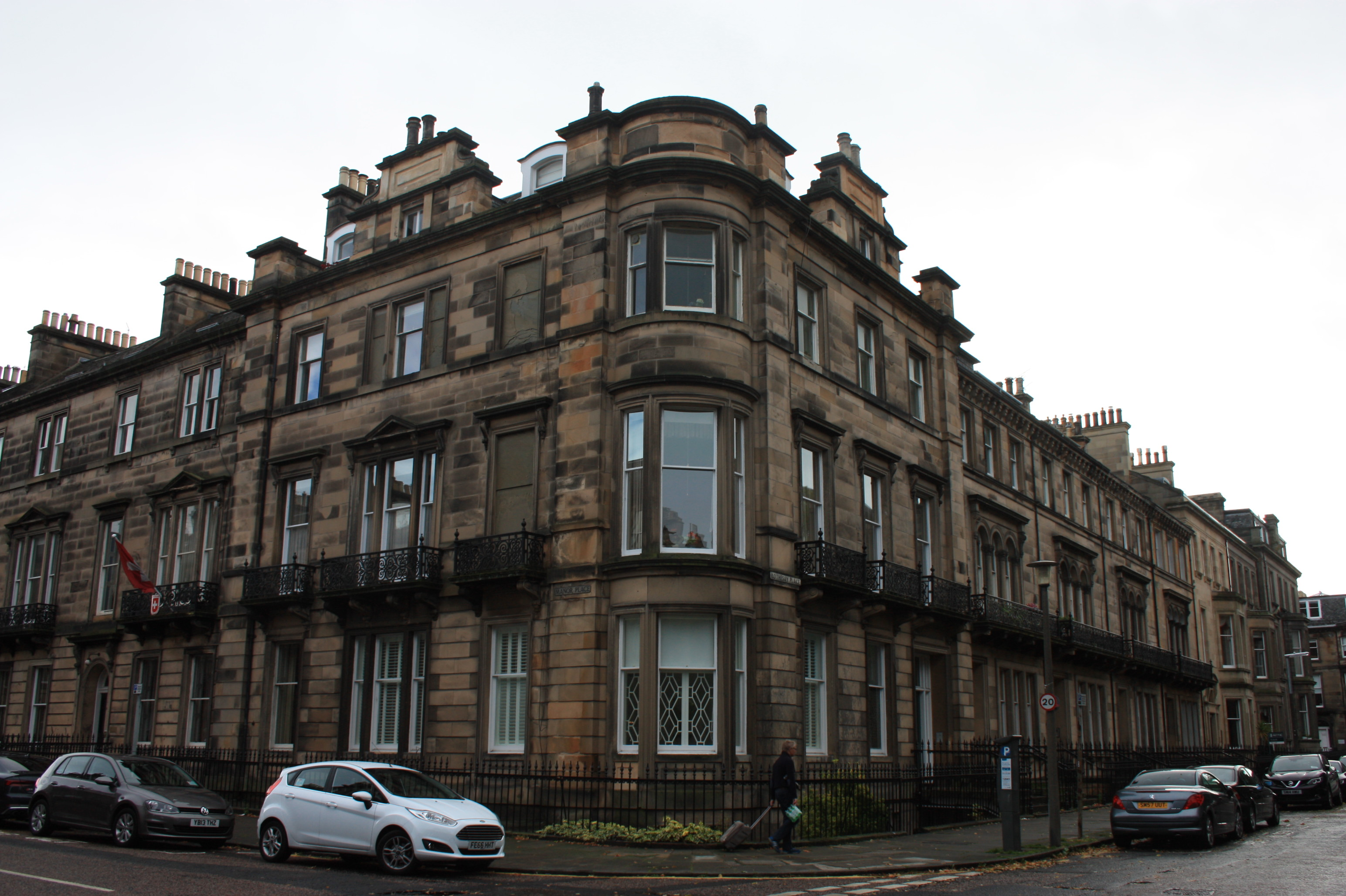
12 Rothesay Place, Edinburgh

Robert Lee, Lord Lee FRSE (1 April 1830 – 11 October 1890) was a 19th-century Scottish lawyer and judge.

== Life ==
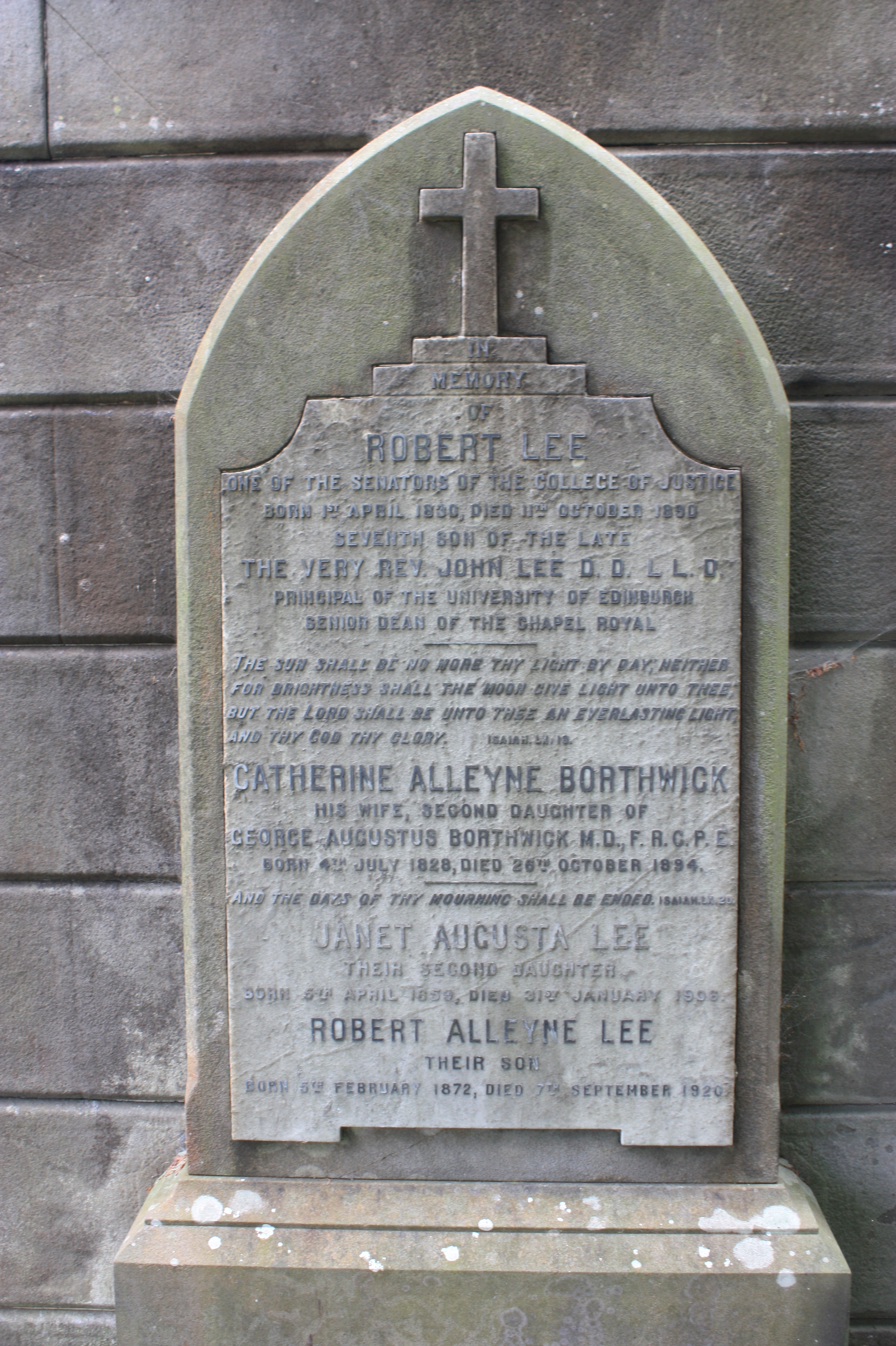
The grave of Lord Lee, Dean Cemetery, Edinburgh

Lee was born on 1 April 1830, one of seven children of Rev John Lee, then minister of Lady Yester's Church, at 131 Princes Street in Edinburgh, looking onto Edinburgh Castle. In 1834, his father was made minister of the Old Church in St Giles Cathedral and the family moved to 12 Charlotte Square, which was then held by the Church of Scotland for use as a manse. In 1837, the family moved again when his father was made Principal of United College, St Andrews, returning to Edinburgh again in 1840 when his father became Principal of the University of Edinburgh. They then lived at 8 Queen Street in the New Town at their own expense.

Lee's life then entered a period of stability. He was educated at Edinburgh Academy then studied law at the University of Edinburgh. He qualified as an Advocate in 1853.

In 1869 he became Procurator to the General Assembly of the Church of Scotland. From 1875 to 1877 he served as Sheriff of Stirling and Dumbarton. From 1877 to 1880 he was Sheriff of Perthshire. In 1880 he was elected a Senator of the College of Justice and granted the title “Lord Lee”. He had been elected a Fellow of the Royal Society of Edinburgh in 1871, his proposer being David Smith.

In his final years he lived at 12 Rothesay Place in Edinburgh's West End. He died on 11 October 1890. He is buried in Dean Cemetery in western Edinburgh. The grave lies midway along the south wall of the first northern extension.

== Family ==
In 1854 he married Catherine Alleyne Borthwick, daughter of George Augustus Borthwick FRSE. They had six children. Eldest daughter Rose married in 1886 to Cressy Bingham Newland (1852-1921)
