= Archibald Bennie =

Scottish minister

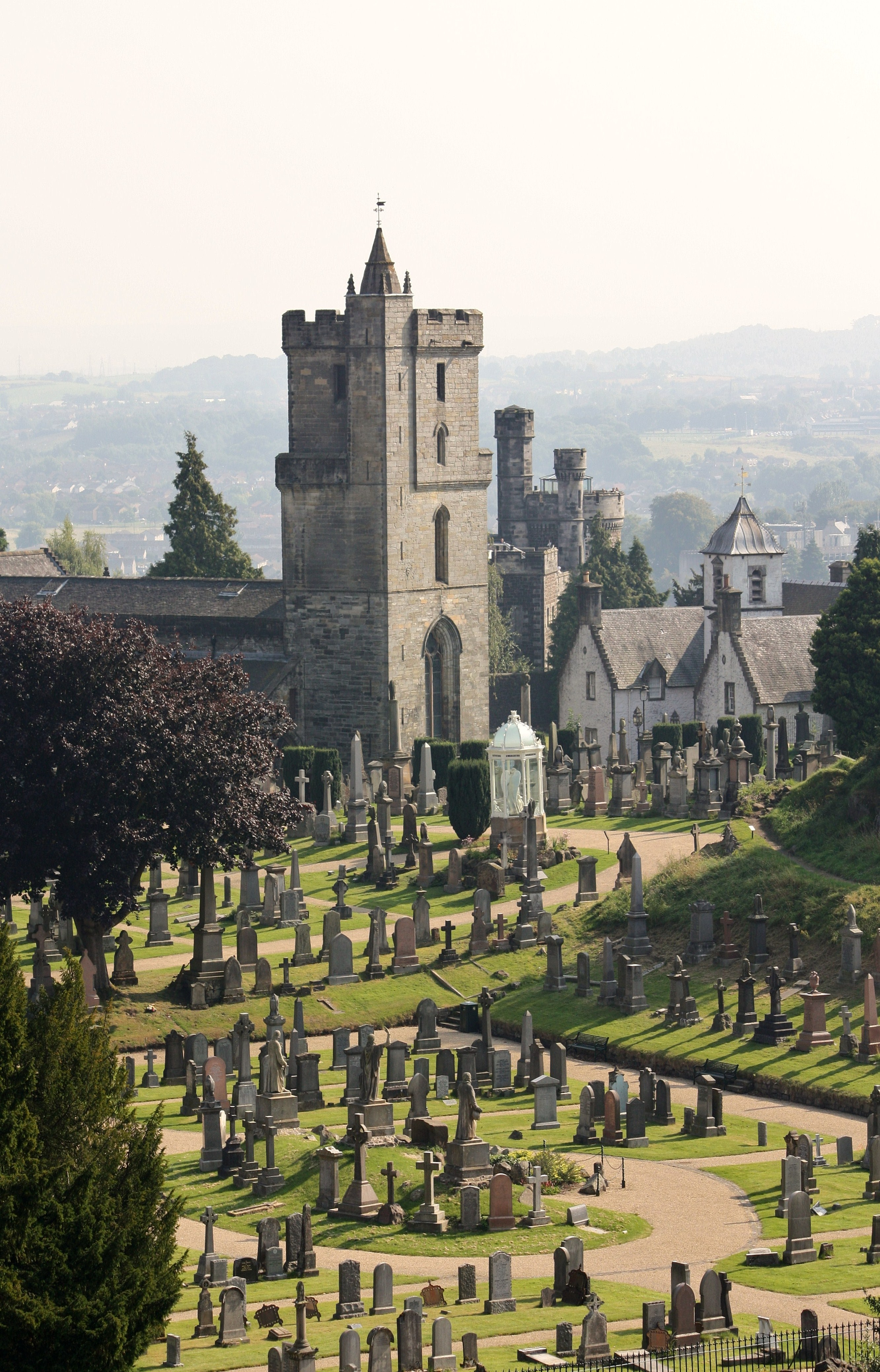
The Church of the Holy Rude in Stirling

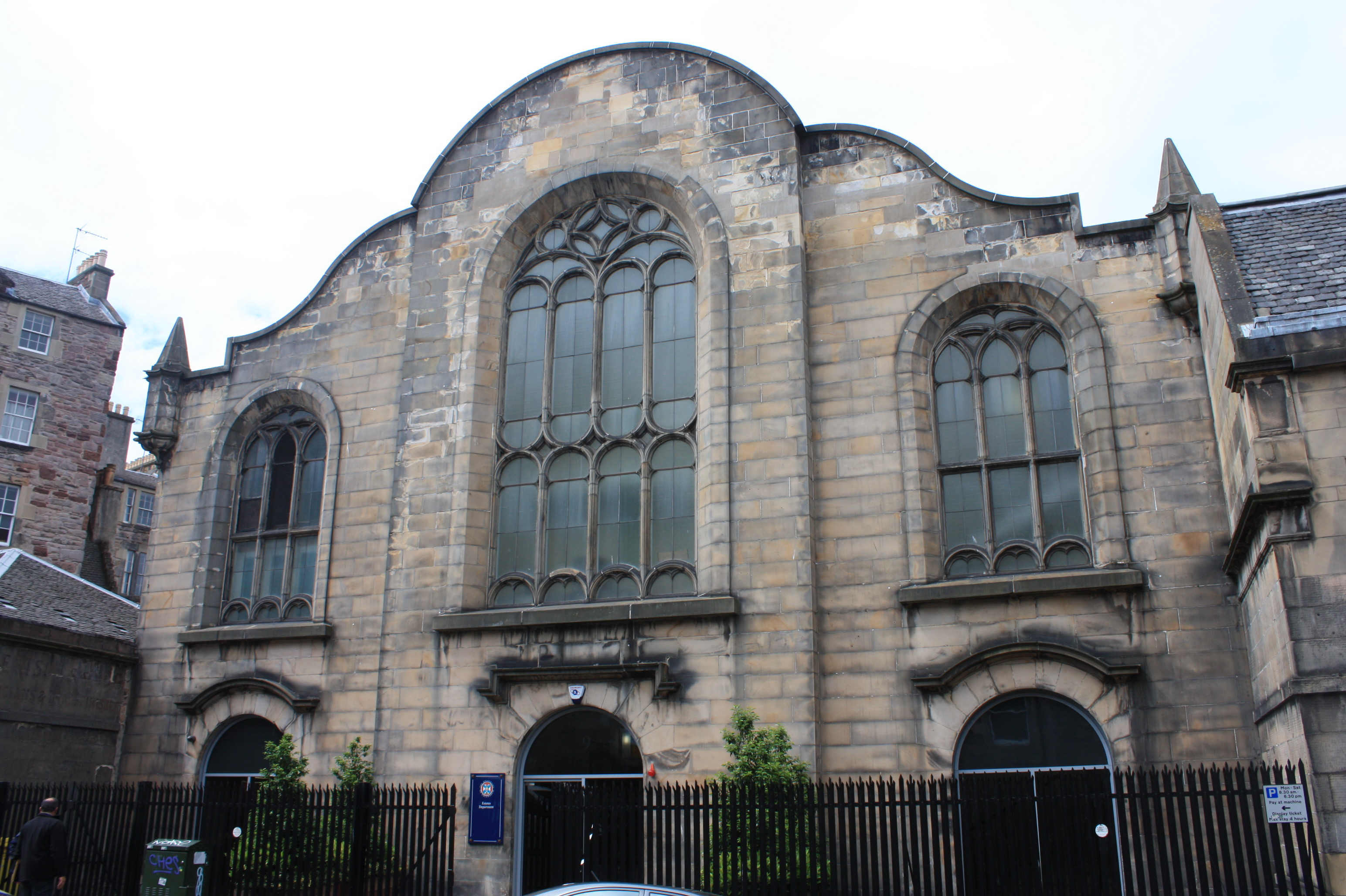
The church building on Infirmary Street.

Archibald Bennie (1797–1846) was a Scottish minister in the 19th century who became Dean of the Chapel Royal (Scotland) and Chaplain in Ordinary to Queen Victoria in Scotland.

== Life ==
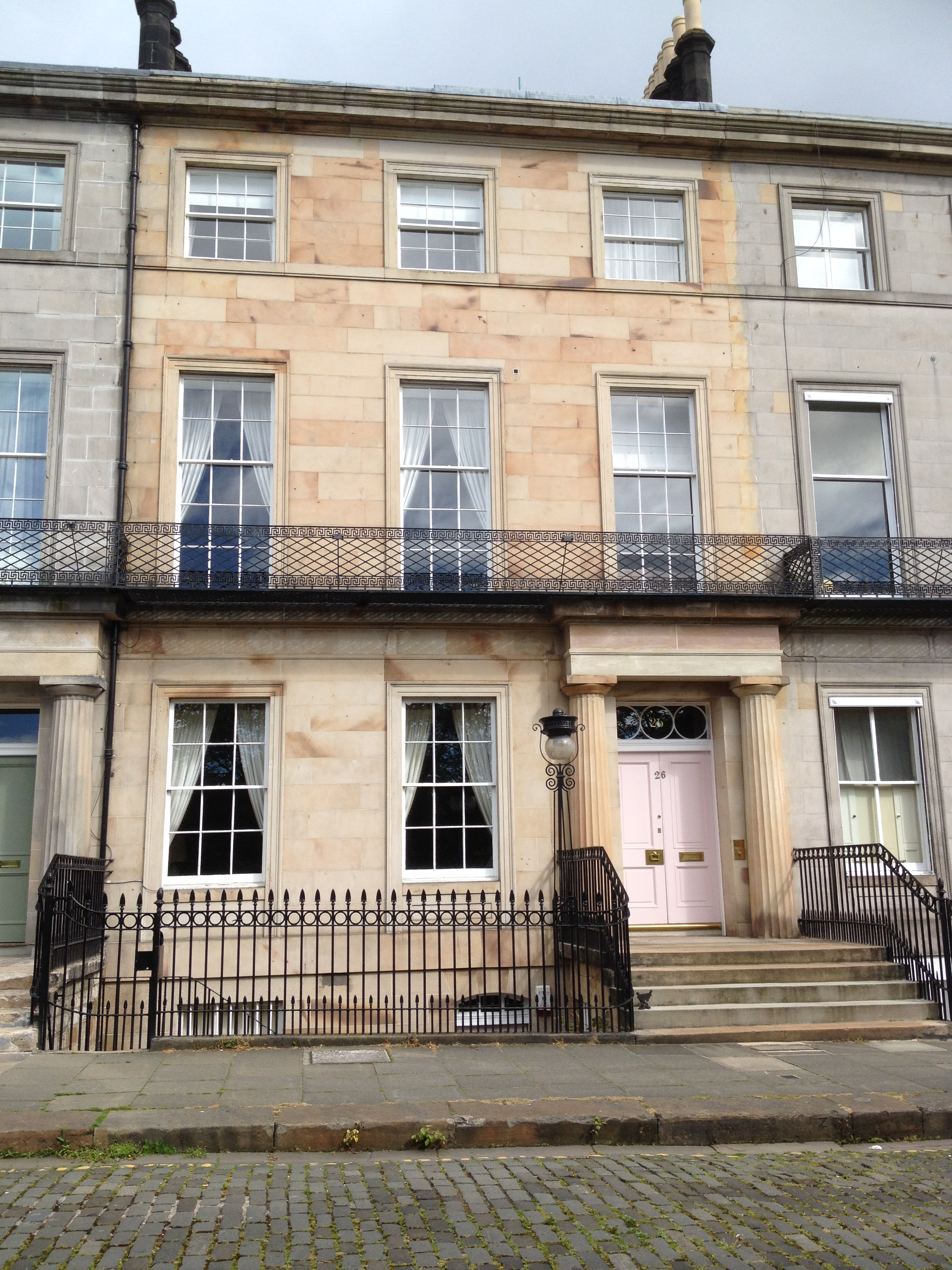
Madden's house at 26 Regent Terrace, Edinburgh

He was born in Glasgow on 1 November 1797 the fourth son of William Bennie, a city merchant. He studied at Glasgow University where he won three prizes.

He was licensed to preach by the Presbytery of Glasgow in September 1820 and ordained as minister of Albion Street Chapel in Glasgow in March 1823.

In October 1824 he translated to third charge of the Church of the Holy Rude in Stirling, was promoted to second charge in June 1825 and first charge in March 1829. In September 1835 Edinburgh town council invited him to take over Lady Yester's Church to fill a post vacated by Rev John Lee moving to Old Kirk of St Giles. In Edinburgh his roles were expanded to include Chaplain in Ordinary to the Queen and Dean of the Chapel Royal, reflecting the very high esteem in which he was held by both church and state.

In 1840 he was living at 26 Regent Terrace, a handsome Georgian villa on Calton Hill viewing over Holyrood Palace and the Old Town.

He received an honorary Doctor of Divinity (DD) from Glasgow University in 1845.

He became ill and moved to Dunoon on the west coast to recover but died there on 21 September 1846. His position at Lady Yester's was filled by John Caird.

== Family ==
In July 1827 he married Eliza Noble (d.1867) only child of James Noble, collector of excise in Stirling. Their children were:

- Ann Young Bennie (b.1828)
- Agnes Mary Bennie (b.1829)
- His son James Noble Bennie LLD (1831-1899) became Canon of Peterborough Cathedral
- Elizabeth Bennie
- Dr Archibald Bennie FRCS (1837-1884)

== Publications ==
- Five Sermons, Christian Benevolence
- Letter to Patrick Arkley advocate (1846)
- The Preaching of the Dead (1846)

He served as editor of The Edinburgh Christian Monitor 1836/7
