= William Henry Gray =

Scottish minister

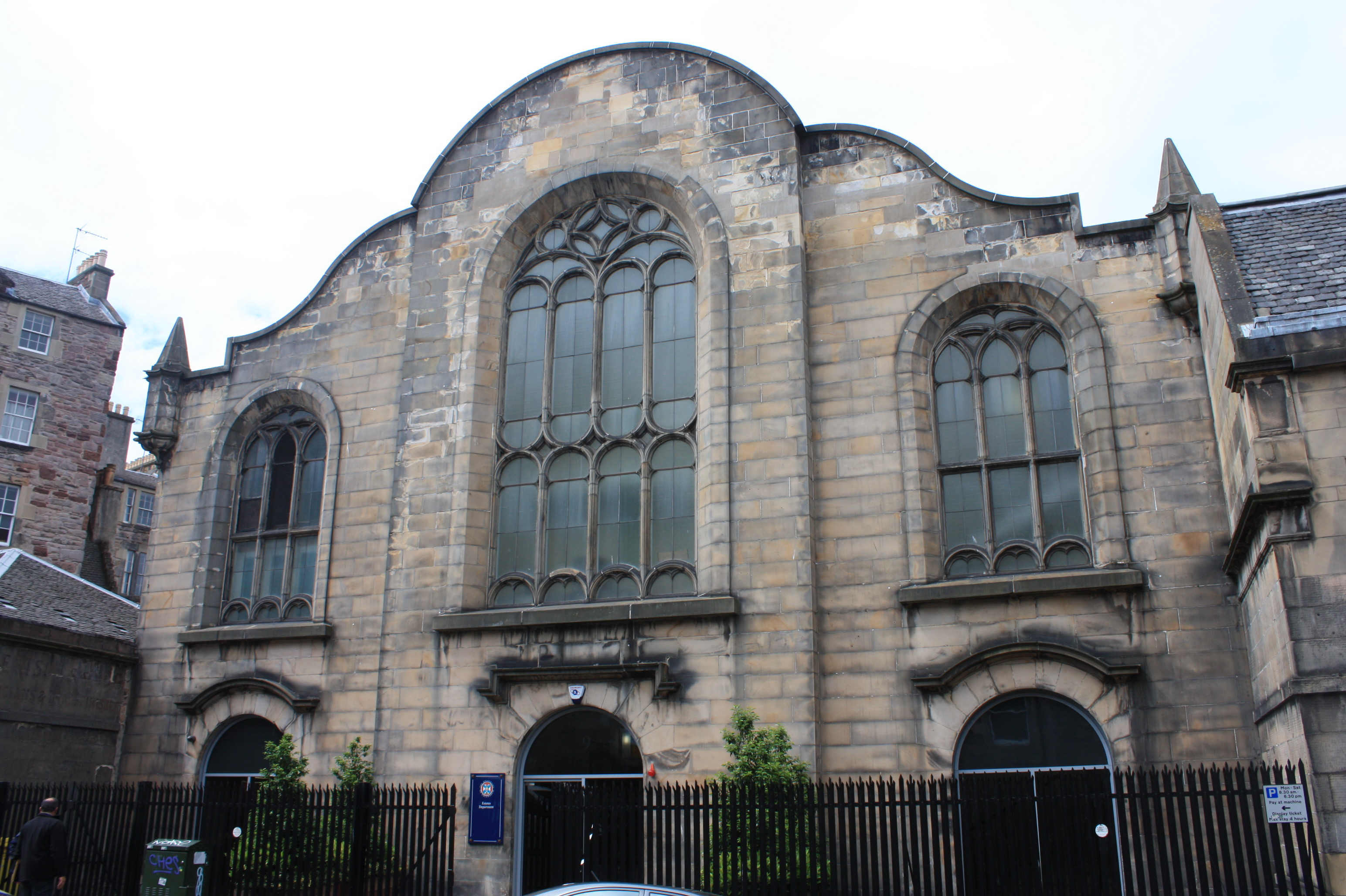
Lady Yester's Church in Edinburgh

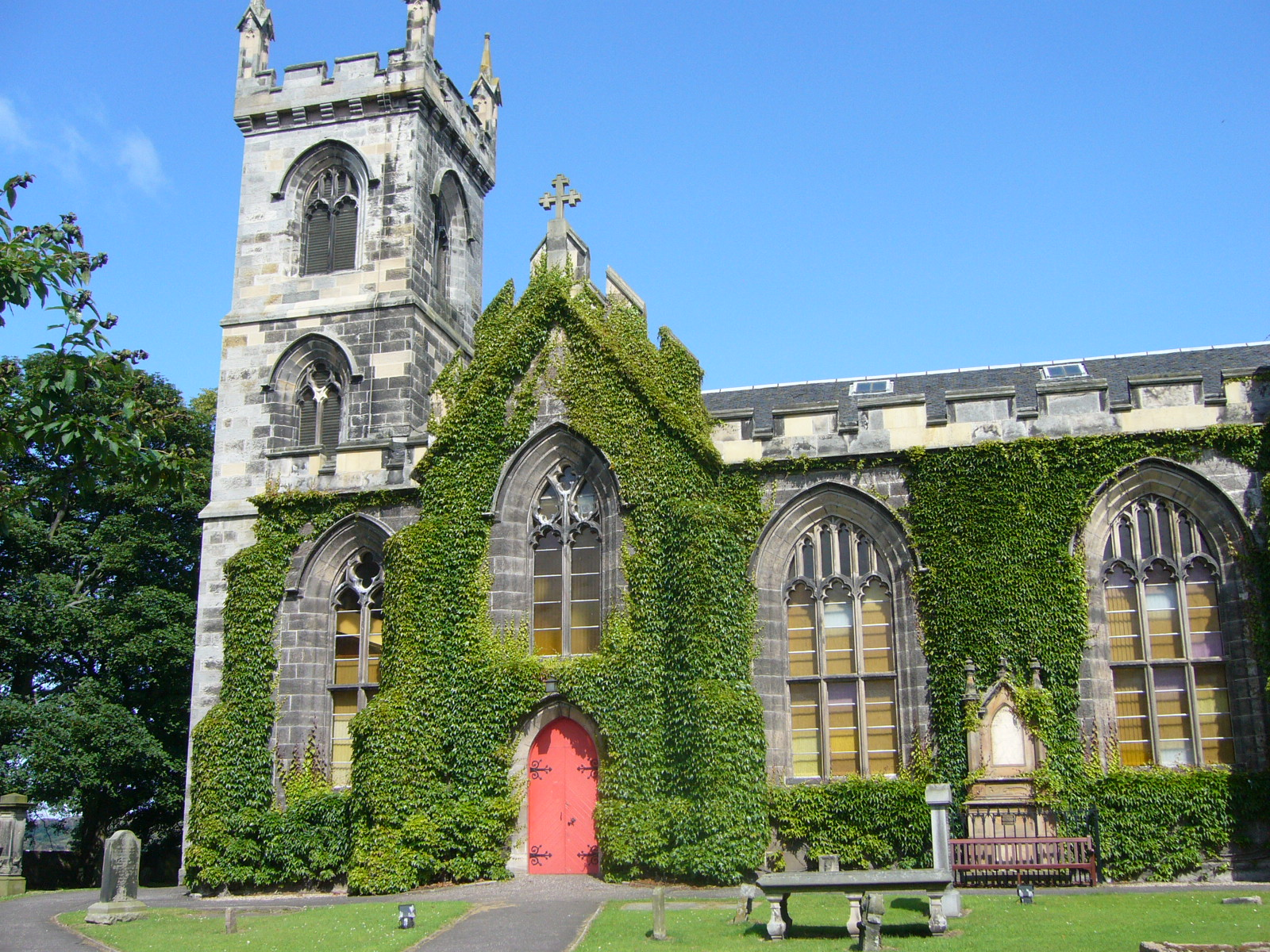
Liberton Kirk

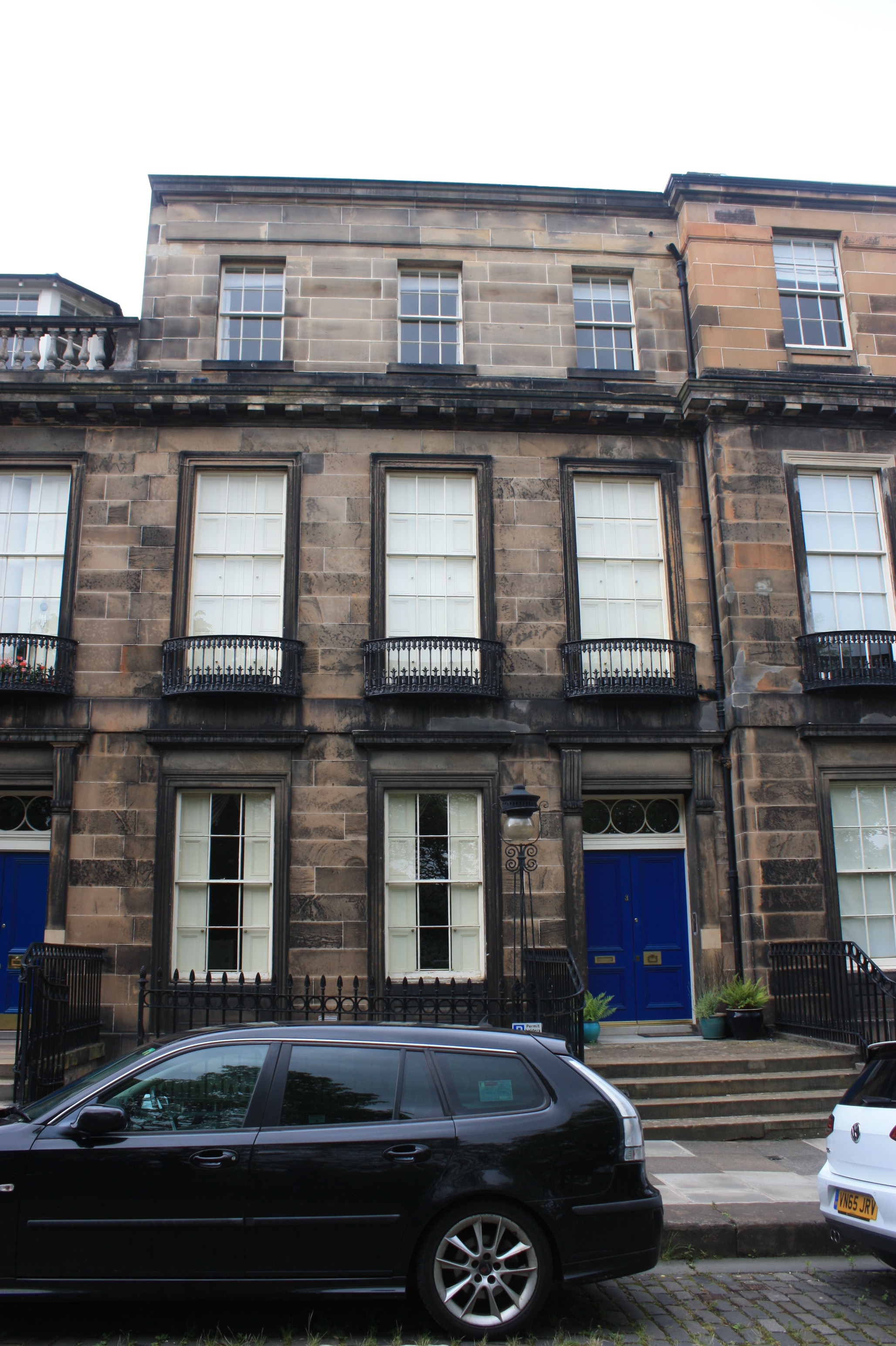
3 Carlton Terrace, Edinburgh

William Henry Gray (1825-1908) was a Scottish minister who served as Moderator of the General Assembly of the Church of Scotland in 1888, the highest position in the Church of Scotland. From 1889 he was styled Very Rev Dr William H. Gray. As an author he wrote several religious books for children.

== Life ==
He was born on 13 February 1825 at Hawkstone near St Madoes in Perthshire the son of Andrew Gray and his wife Jane Kettle. He claimed to be descended from the Grays of Kinfauns Castle. He was educated at Perth Seminary then studied divinity at St Andrews University graduating MA in 1841. He was licensed to preach by the Presbytery of Perth in June 1843.

He was ordained in November 1846 at St Paul's Church in Perth. In 1849 he then succeeded Rev John Caird at Lady Yester's Kirk in central Edinburgh where he preached for over 30 years. He then served as minister of Liberton, Edinburgh from 1880 to 1898.

Following retiral in November 1897 he moved to 3 Carlton Terrace on Calton Hill in central Edinburgh, an impressive Georgian terraced townhouse. The building faces south over Edinburgh Old Town and Holyrood Palace and is now the Free French House.

He died at home in Edinburgh on 6 December 1908.

== Family ==
In June 1855 he married Mary Smith Mitchell, daughter of Robert Mitchell an Edinburgh magistrate and widow of William Richardson Dickson of Alton in Roxburghshire who had a son and two daughters by her previous marriage.

== Publications ==
- Morning Seed: Sermons for the Young (1861)
- Sermons on Disestablishment (1893)
- A Simple Catechism (1895)
- Jubilee Jottings (1896)
- Old Greeds and New Beliefs (1899)
- Our Divine Shepherd: A Book for Young People (1903)
- The Children's Friend (1907)
