= Church of the Holy Rude =

- The Parish Church of the Holy Rude
- Eaglais na Crois Naoimh
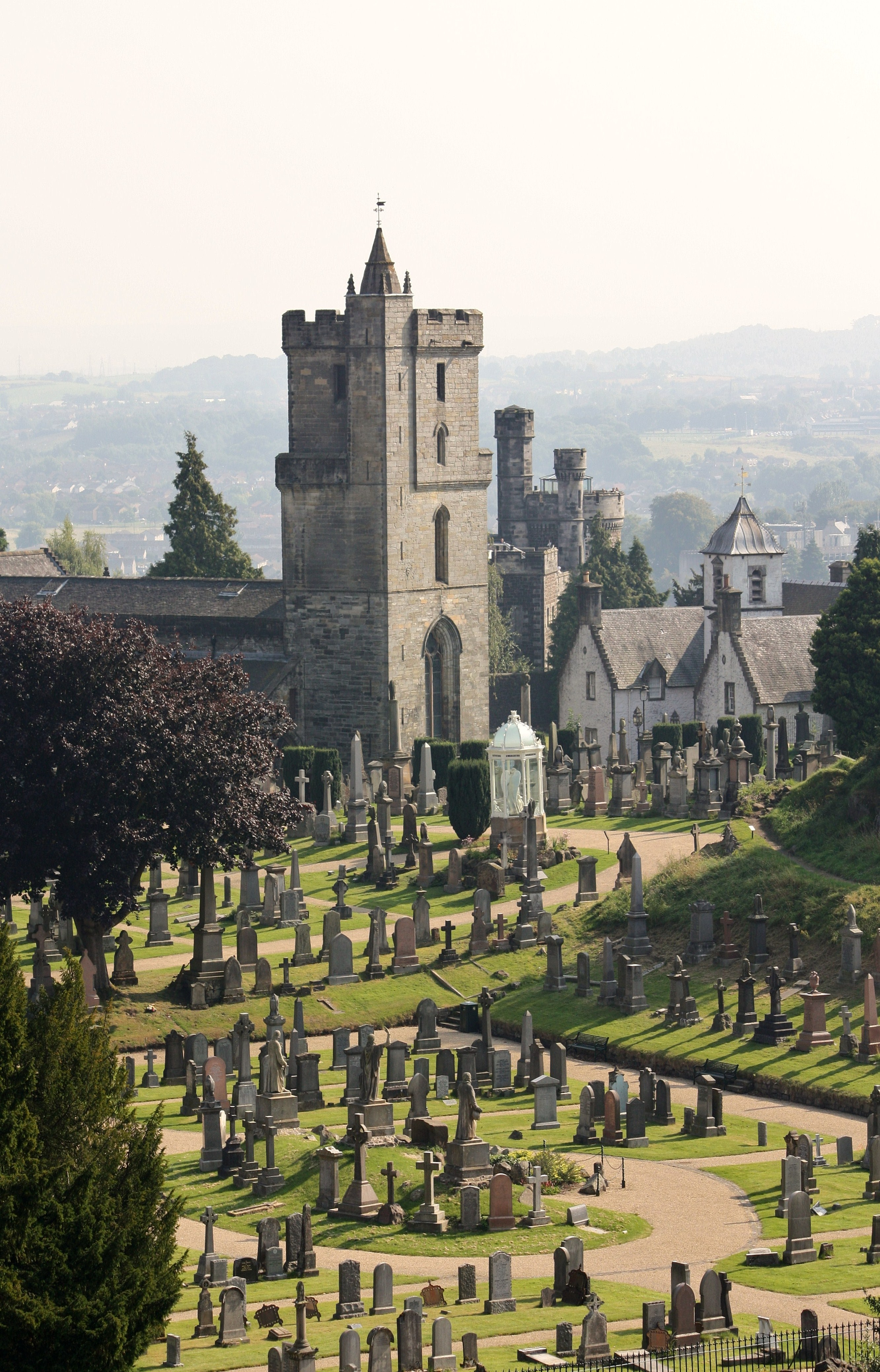
- A view from Stirling Castle

- Location within Stirling Location within Scotland
- 56°07′15.1″N 3°56′40.0″W
- Location: Stirling
- Country: Scotland
- Denomination: Church of Scotland
- Previous denomination: Roman Catholic
- Churchmanship: Presbyterian
- Website: Church Website

History
- Status: Parish church
- Founded: 1129
- Founder: David I of Scotland
- Dedication: Holy Cross

Architecture
- Functional status: Active
- Style: Gothic
- Completed: 1530

Specifications
- Length: 60.96 m (200 ft 0 in)

Administration
- Parish: Stirling

The Church of the Holy Rude (Scottish Gaelic: Eaglais na Crois Naoimh) is the medieval parish church of Stirling, Scotland. It is named after the Holy Rood, a relic of the True Cross on which Jesus was crucified. The church was founded in 1129 during the reign of David I, but the earliest part of the present church dates from the 15th century. As such it is the second oldest building in Stirling after Stirling Castle, parts of which date from the later 14th century. The chancel and tower were added in the 16th century.

Stirling Castle has long been a favoured residence of the Scottish monarchs, and was developed as a Renaissance palace during the reigns of the later Stewart kings. The Church of the Holy Rude, adjacent to the castle, became similarly associated with the Scottish monarchy, hosting royal baptisms and coronations. It is one of three churches still in use in Britain that have been the sites of coronations. (Note: The others are Westminster Abbey and Gloucester Cathedral.)

== History ==
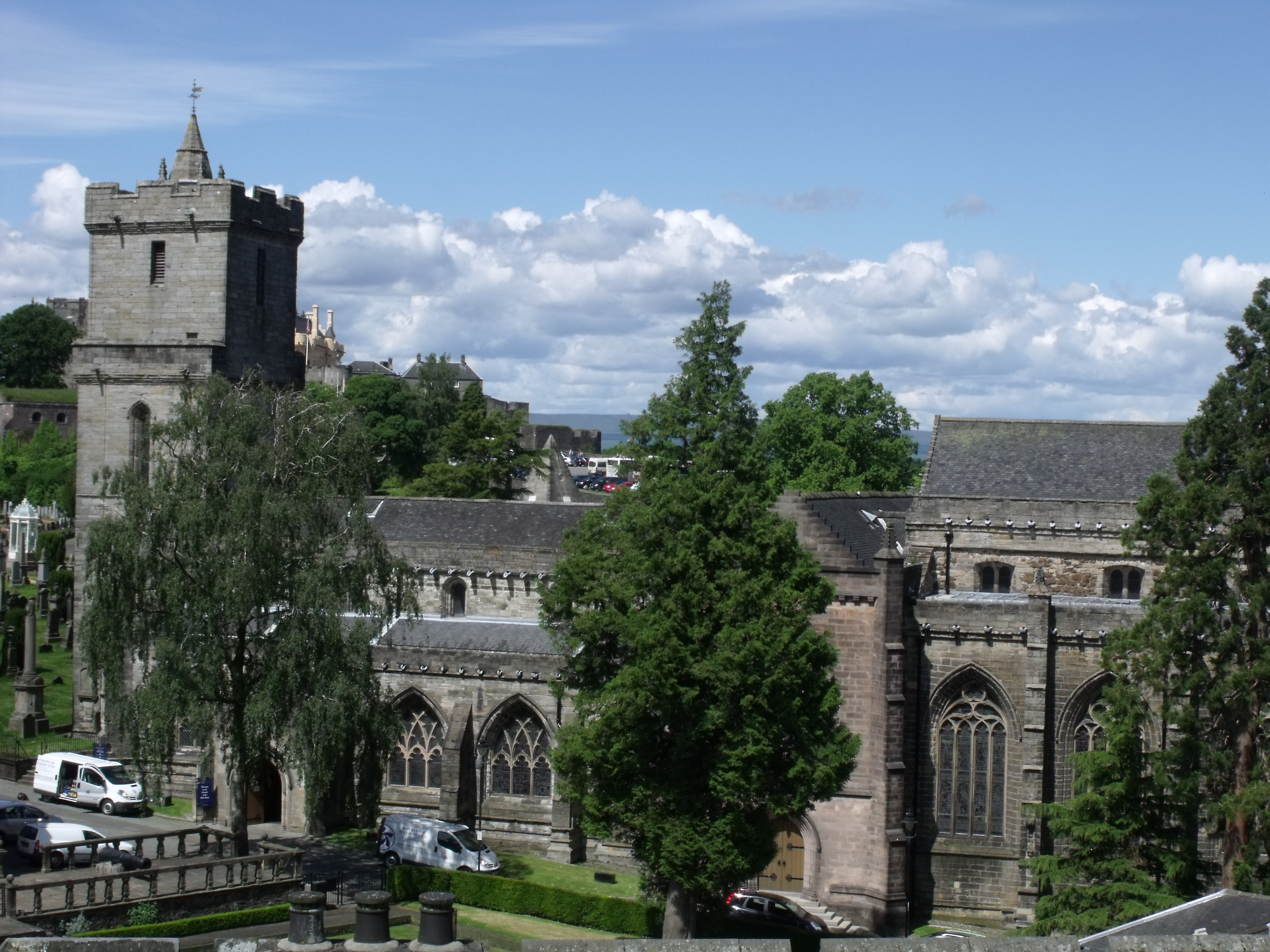
A view from the roof of Stirling Old Town Jail

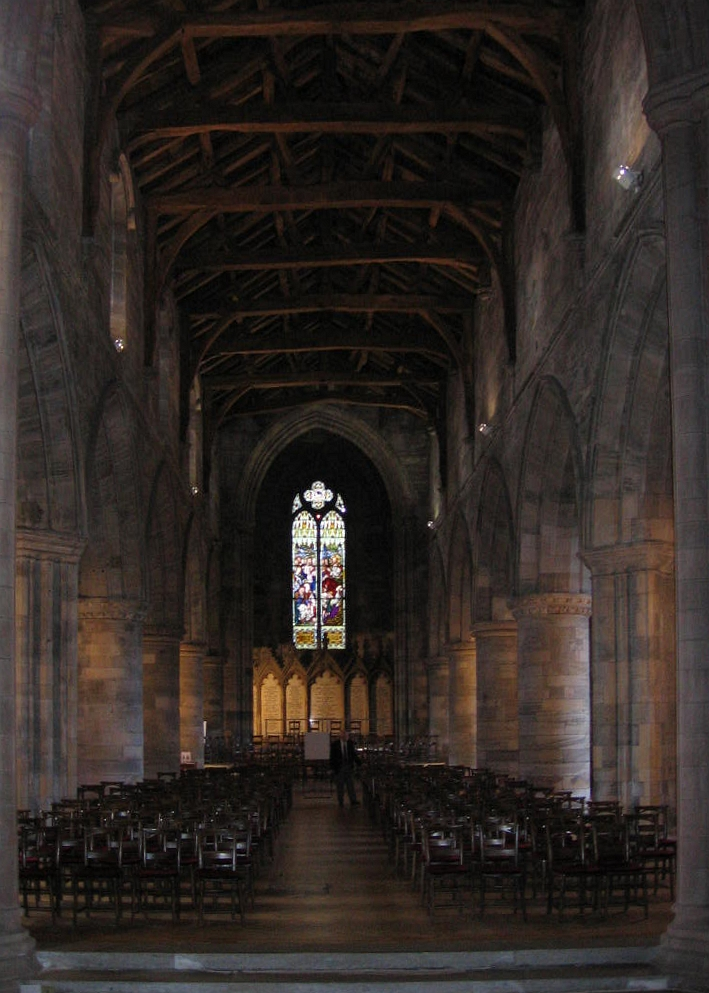
Interior

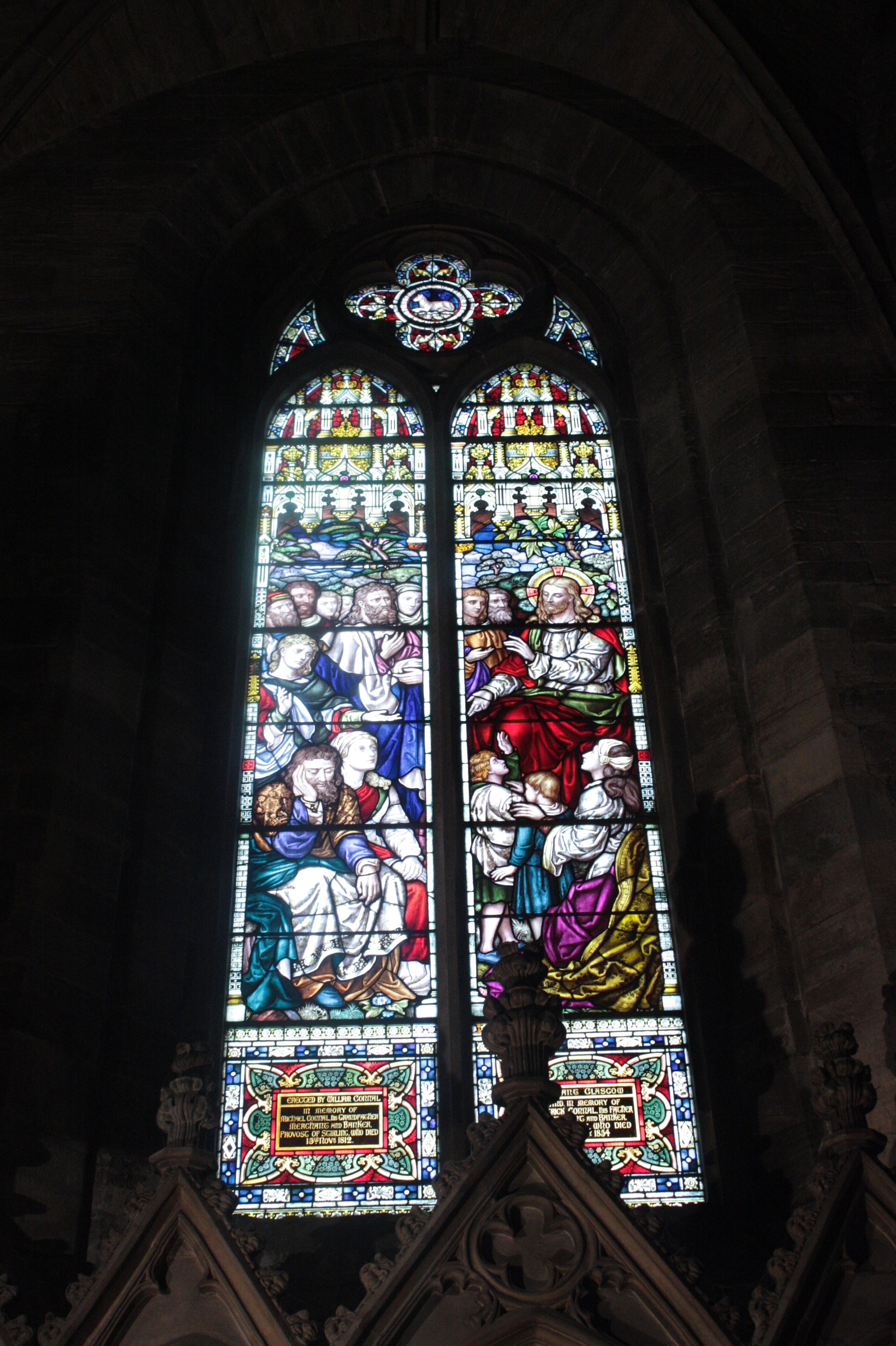
West window, Holy Rude Church, Stirling

The church was founded in 1129, but due to a fire in 1405, nothing of the early structure now remains.

Construction on the new nave had begun by 1414, and based on the evidence of carved heraldry, the vault of the nave was completed between 1440 and 1480. Work on the chancel did not commence until 1507 and was completed around 1530, which was when the west tower was also extended to its current height. King James VI was crowned King of Scots in the church on 29 July 1567. Adam Bothwell, Bishop of Orkney performed the ceremony, and John Knox preached a sermon.

A second charge was secured for the parish of Stirling in 1607. In 1731 a third charge was founded. This led to the growth of a third congregation, and, in 1840, the North Church was built for the services of the third charge.

It has been suggested that, in the Siege of Stirling Castle in 1651 by General Monk during the Wars of the Three Kingdoms, the church and churchyard suffered damage from musket shots, which is still visible. However, all damage is opposite of the south rampart of Stirling Castle, and as damage clusters around the slot windows, it is more likely to be remnants of a "game" of soldiers firing from the castle to get the musket ball through the slot. Were it from an attacking force, damage would have been on the south side. James Guthrie, who was later executed, was the minister at the time. Soon after, Guthrie with two or three elders appointed Robert Rule as Guthrie's successor, which caused a schism in the congregation. In 1656, a dividing wall was built and each side was treated as a separate church. . The building of the wall followed a disagreement between the two ministers. One minister occupied the eastern half (East Church), and the second minister the other half (West Church). In 1935 Holy Rude was united and the interior dividing wall was demolished.

In 1940, the church was restored and the fine oak beam roof was re-exposed.

In 2023 the church announced a partnership with Stirling District Tourism Ltd, with the aim of promoting the site as a tourist destination.

=== Hew Scott's summary ===
The fine parish church of the Holy Rood at Stirling was built in 1500, to replace the church of St. Modan, which had been burned down.

There is an early record of a church built at Stirling by St Monenna, but it is not likely that it was a stone building. In 1463, when James III was king, the Hospital of St James was erected at the Stirling end of the bridge over the Forth. Near the bridge, somewhat later, was built a chapel of St Roque. In James IV's time Stirling acquired another hospital, which still exists. It attests to the munificence of Robert Spital, the King's tailor. During the same reign, in 1494, a house of the Grey Friars, dedicated to St Modan, was established in the town. King James IV lived much at Stirling, and it was he who set up one of its most notable foundations, that of the Collegiate Church of the Chapel Royal. It was dedicated to St Mary and St Michael, and was famed for its elaborate musical services. In the part of this parish that lies on the left bank of the Forth stand the ruins of St Mary's Augustinian Abbey of Cambuskenneth. It was founded by King David I in 1147, and had very wide possessions. Within its church there were altars of St Ninian and St Katherine. Of the Abbey buildings little now remains but the church tower. It is very complete. There is also a monument erected by Queen Victoria to keep in mind her ancestors James III and his Queen, Margaret of Denmark, who lie buried in the Abbey Church. There were many altars and shrines in the Rood Kirk, and some of their names are well known. These include dedications to the Holy Trinity, St Mary, St Michael, St Anne, St Andrew, St James, St John the Baptist, St Ninian, St Salvator, St Peter, St Paul, St Laurence, St Katherine, St Modan, St Cuthbert, St Eloi, St Severinus, and St Aubert.

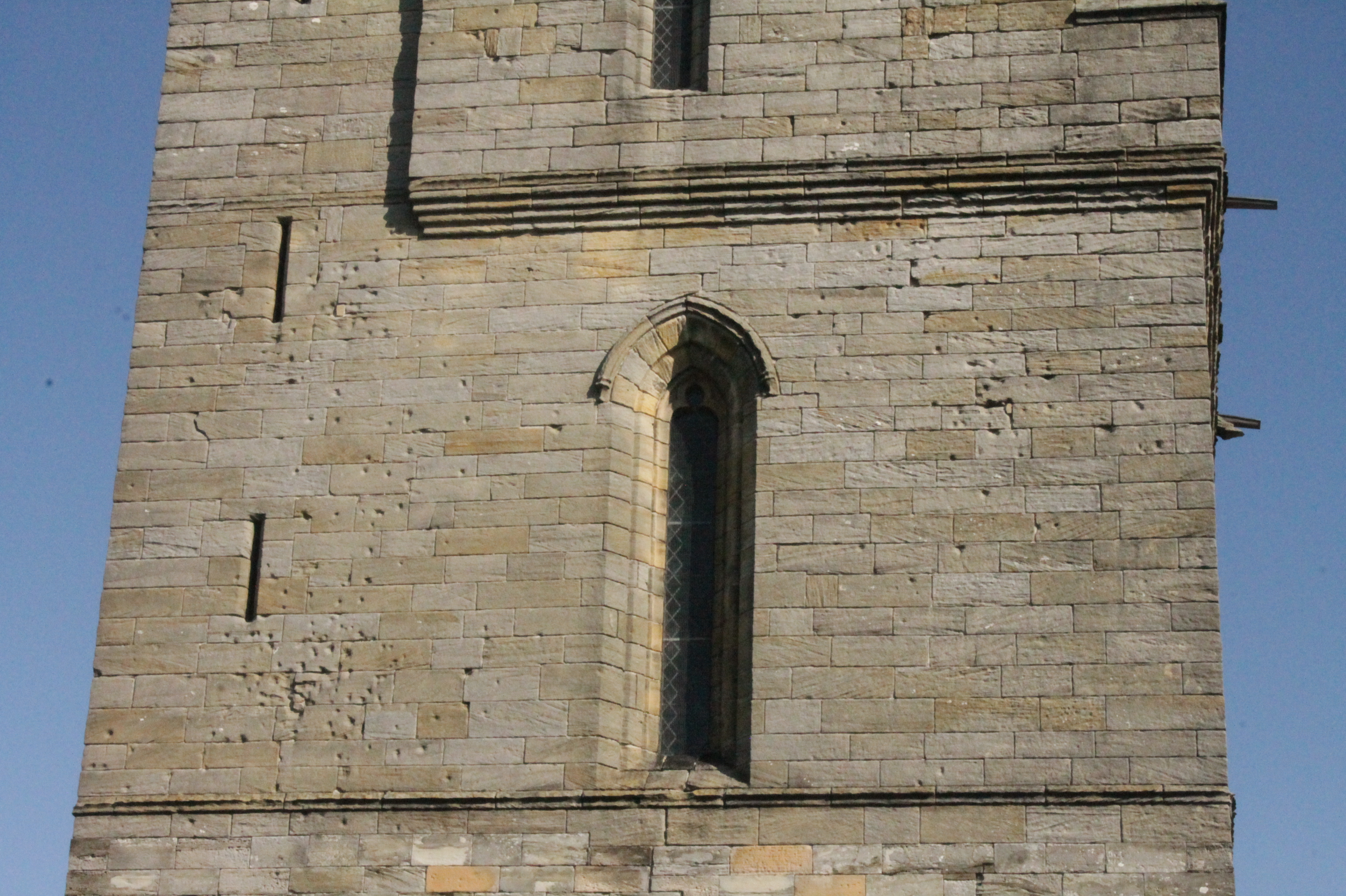
Musket ball damage on the north side of the Church of the Holy Rude, Stirling

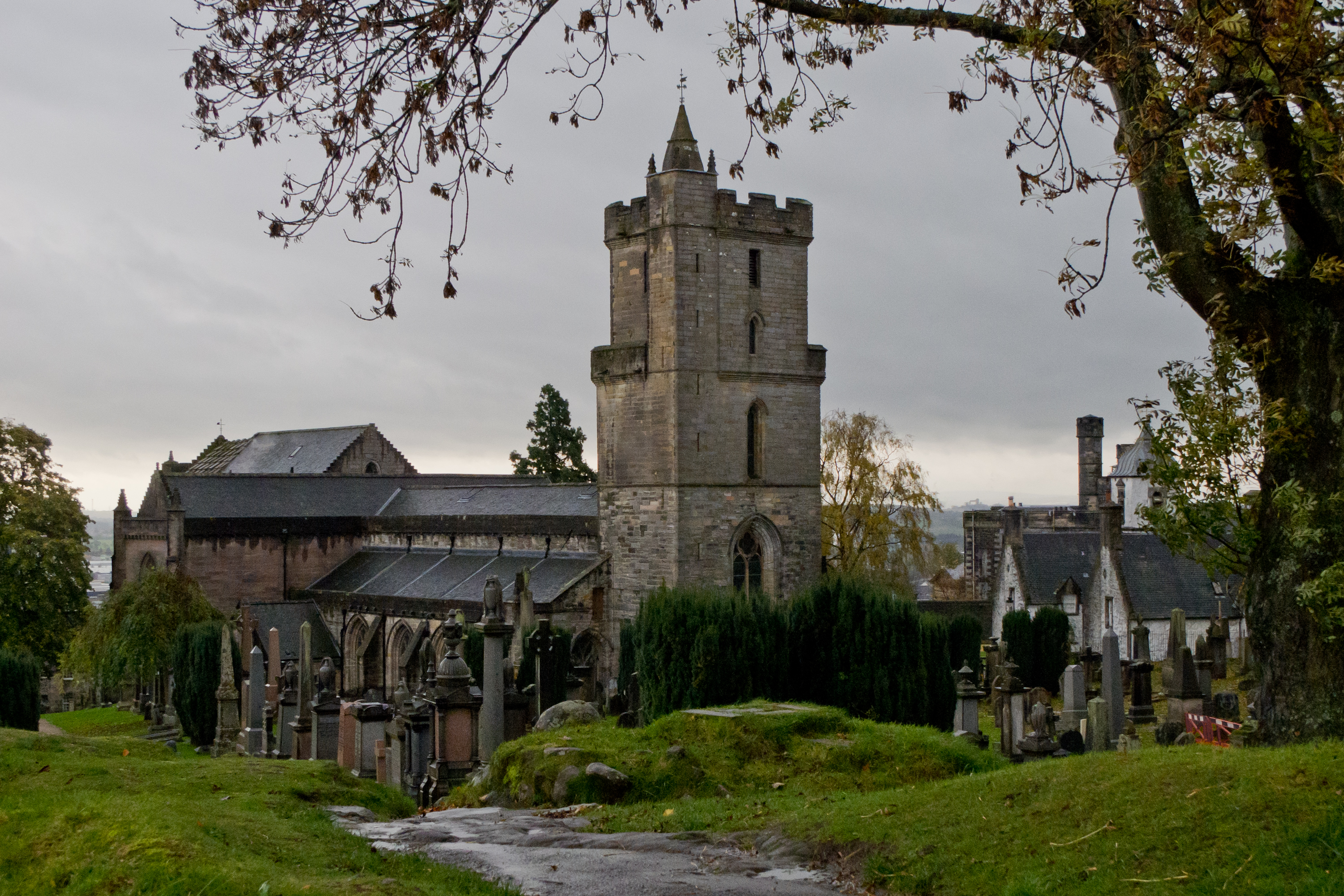
A view from the churchyard

There were in this parish Wells of St Mary, St John, and St Thomas. Stirling held fairs on Ascension Day, Roodmas Day, and Our Lady Day in Harvest.

== Stained glass ==
The church contains many fine stained glass windows, mainly from the late 19th century, including examples by Ballantine & Co., Adam & Small, and Cottier & Co.

== Apse ==
The church's semi-octagonal apse was the inspiration for that of St Leonard's-in-the-Fields Church in Perth.

== Graveyard ==
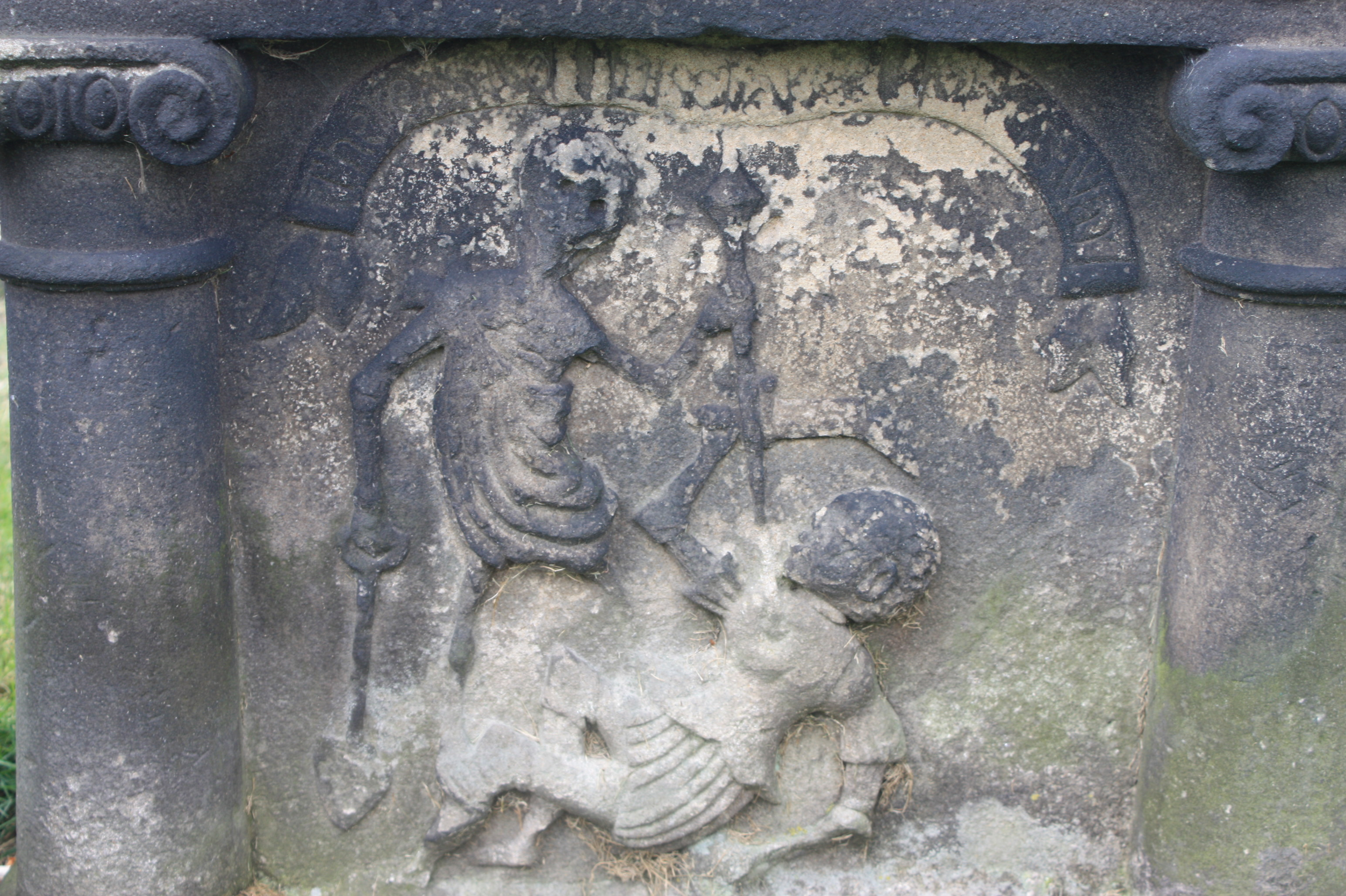
Unique body-snatching headstone, Stirling, 1823

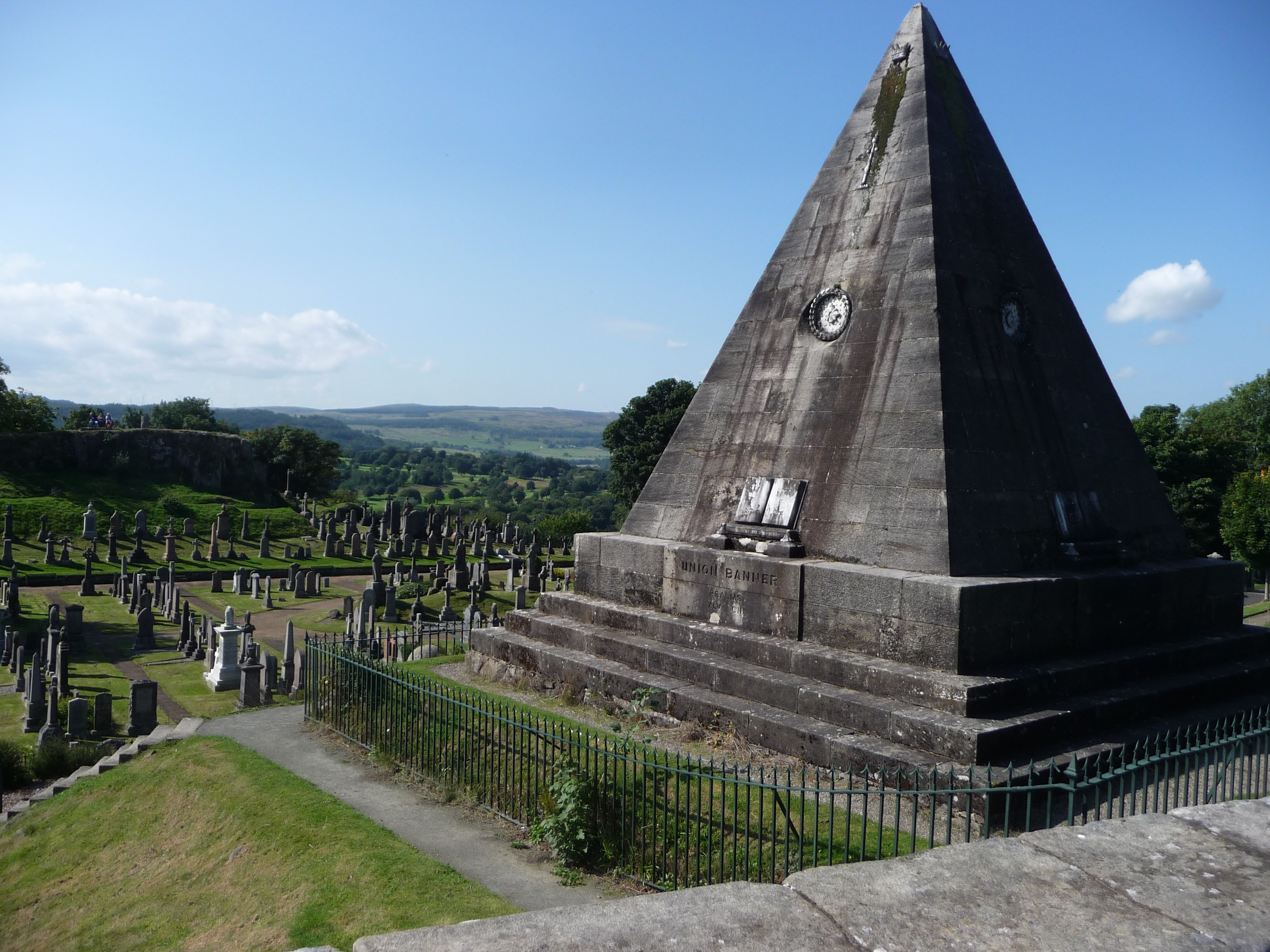
The Star Pyramid in the cemetery

The church has a historic churchyard lying primarily to the west and north-west of the church. Stones date from the 16th century.

The churchyard was extended in 1851, creating the Valley Cemetery to the north, divided from the old cemetery by only a path. This contains a series of statues by Alexander Handyside Ritchie of figures from the Reformation.

The old graveyard contains a unique stone with a carved depiction of body-snatching, marking the theft of Mary Stevenson (1767–1822) by James McNab, the local gravedigger who had buried her two days earlier, on 16 November 1822, aided by a friend, Daniel Mitchell. The body was passed to John Forrest, for dissection. The two men were caught, but released due to legal technicalities and a riot ensued. Mary's body was reburied and the stone carved to mark the strange event.

Graves of note in the old cemetery include:

- Rev Alexander Beith
- Rev Archibald Bennie FRSE
- John Cowane, founder of Cowane's Hospital
- David Doig
- Professor Henry Drummond
- Charles Albert Fawsitt chemist and colleague of William Dittmar
- Rev George Mure Smith, theological author
- William Honeyman Gillespie, theological author
- Commander George Holbrow Lang RN
- William Marshall founder of the Marshall Trust
- Rev Prof John MacMillan
- Charles Randolph, engineer and shipbuilder, co-founder of Randolph & Elliott
- Major William Henry Peddie of 21st Royal North British Fusiliers, and Fort Major: Stirling Castle
- Rev John Russell subject of poems by Robert Burns
- John Sconce (a huge Renaissance monument)
- John Elliot Shearer historian
- John Terris (artist)
- David Yellowlees (1836–1921) psychiatrist

=== New Cemetery ===
To the north, under the castle ramparts

- A. R. W. Allan RSA, artist (stone by Pilkington Jackson
- Charles Henry Greig, architect of Craig House Asylum in 1889
- Irvin Iffla cricketer
- Air pilot Charles Livingstone DFM killed on BOAC Flight 781
