= George Augustus Borthwick =

Scottish physician and surgeon

Dr George Augustus Borthwick FRSE FRCSE FSA (1784-1844) was a Scottish physician and surgeon. He was Physician to the Royal Dispensary in Edinburgh and helped to establish the Edinburgh Eye Dispensary.

== Life ==
He was born in 1784.In 1808 he received his doctorate from the University of Edinburgh.

In 1820 he was elected a Fellow of the Royal Society of Edinburgh. His proposers were Sir James Hall, 4th Baronet, Sir George Steuart Mackenzie, and John Borthwick of Crookston (thought to be a brother or cousin). At this time he was living at 83 George Street in Edinburgh's New Town. In 1821 he was elected a member of the Aesculapian Club. In 1821 Borthwick was also elected a member of the Harveian Society of Edinburgh and served as President in 1826. In May 1831 he was commissioned as a Surgeon into the Royal Midlothian Yeoman Cavalry.

He is buried in the grave of his son-in-law, Robert Lee, Lord Lee in Dean Cemetery in western Edinburgh. The grave lies on the south wall of the first northern extension, towards the south-west.

== Family ==
In March 1821 he married Janet Kinnear. They had at least five children, including George and Fearne Borthwick.
