= John Hyndman =

Church of Scotland Minister

John Hyndman (1723–1762) was a Church of Scotland minister who served as Moderator of the General Assembly of the Church of Scotland, the highest position in the Scottish church.

== Life ==
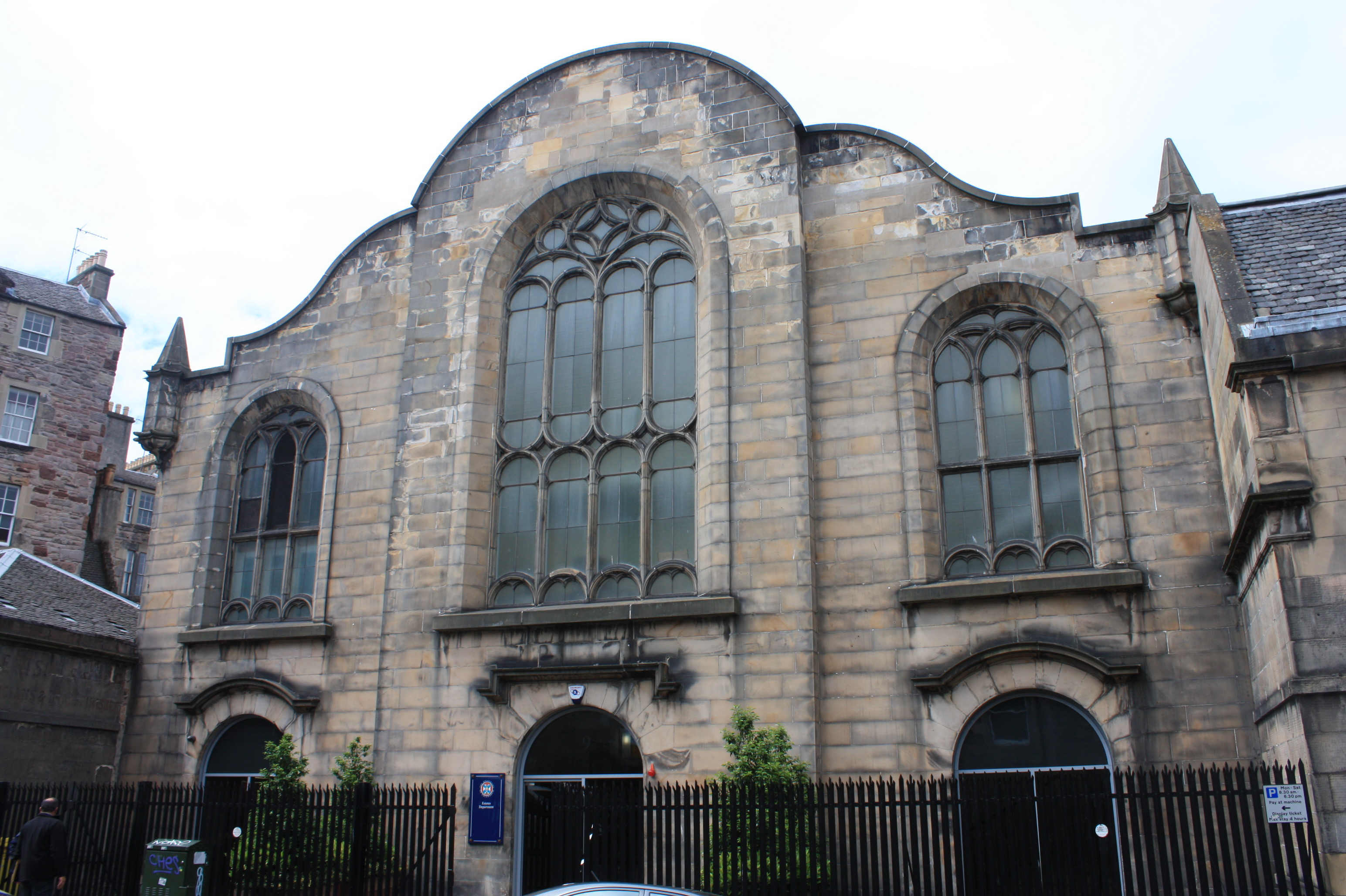
Lady Yester's Church in Edinburgh

He was born in 1723 in Greenock the son of John Hyndman, a shipmaster. He trained for the church at Glasgow University

He was ordained as minister of Colinton Parish Church (south-west of Edinburgh) in November 1746. In February 1752 he was translated to St Cuthbert's Church, Edinburgh in place of Rev. Thomas Pitcairn.

In 1753, Hyndman published "A Just View of the Constitution of the Church of Scotland" which was critical of Thomas Gillespie and ministers who refused to follow the directions of the General Assembly in the Inverkeithing Case of 1752.

King's College, Aberdeen awarded him a Doctor of Divinity in 1761 for his many religious books. In the summer of 1761 (whilst still at Saint Cuthberts) he was elected Moderator of the General Assembly, the highest position in the Church of Scotland. In October 1761 (during his year as Moderator) he translated to Lady Yester's Church in Edinburgh.

== Death ==
He died on 10 August 1762 during his term of office as Moderator and was replaced by Rev Robert Trail.

== Family ==
He was married to Margaret Dalrymple of Dreghorn Castle (1723–1811).

== Publications ==
- A Sermon on Proverbs XIV 34 (1761)
