= Robert Trail (moderator) =

18th-century Scottish minister

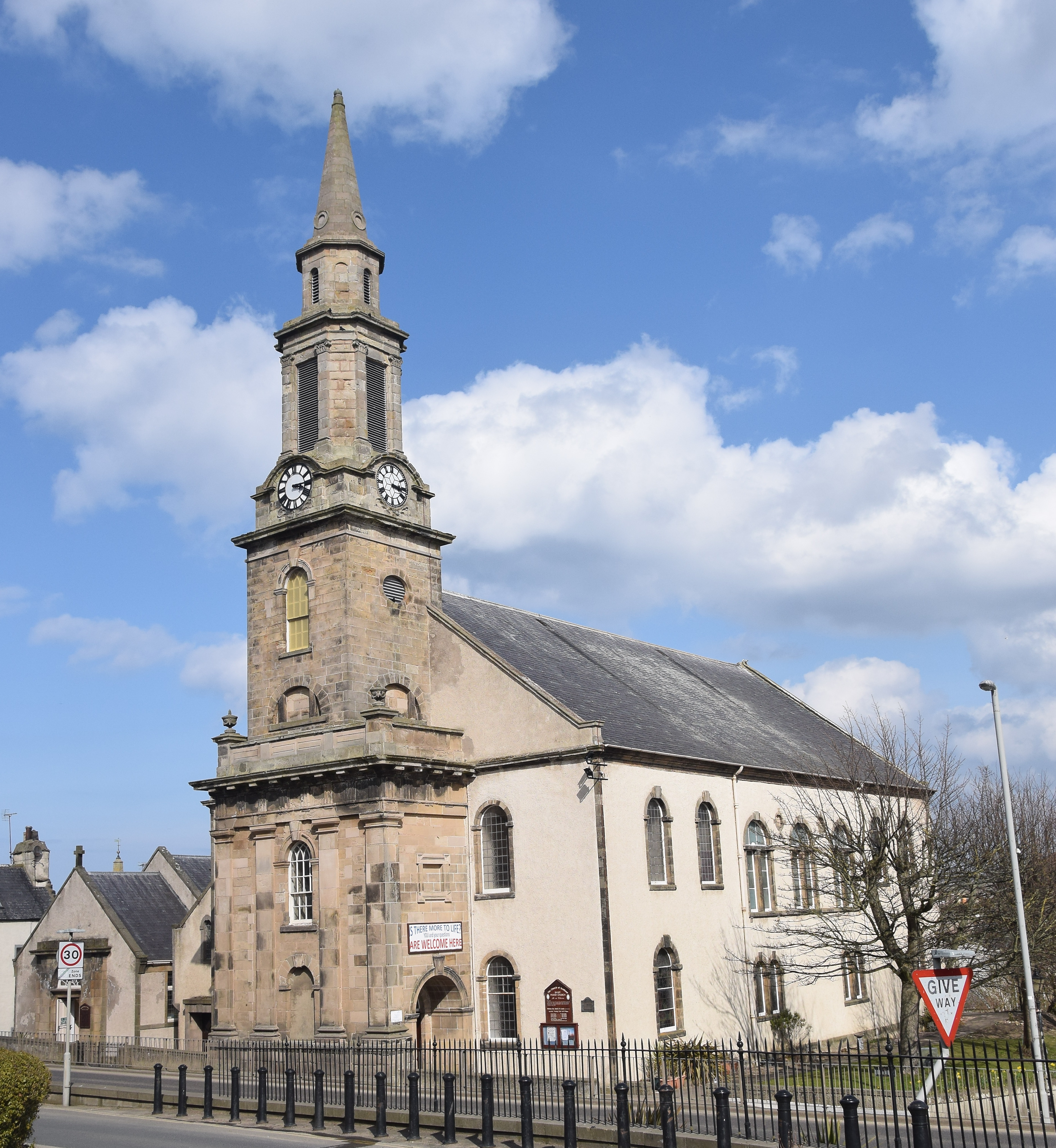
St Mary's Church, Banff

Robert Trail DD (1720–1775) was an 18th-century Scottish minister who served as professor of both Oriental languages and divinity at Glasgow University and as Moderator of the General Assembly of the Church of Scotland in 1762.

== Life ==
Trail was born in the small village of Benholme in Kincardineshire in 1720, the second son of Rev William Trail, the parish minister.

He studied at Edinburgh University and was licensed by the Presbytery of Brechin to preach as a minister of the Church of Scotland in August 1744.

In April 1745, Trail was presented by the Crown to the congregation of Kettins. In January 1746 he was formally ordained, taking place at Meigle due to a mob assembling at Kettins. In December 1753 he translated from Kettins to St Mary's Church in Banff (Banff Parish Church).

In 1760 St Andrews University awarded him a Doctor of Divinity.

In October 1761, Trail joined Glasgow University as Professor of Oriental Languages. On the promotion of William Leechman to Principal, a few weeks later, Trail was asked to fill his place as Professor of Divinity.

In 1762, Trail succeeded the John Hyndman as Moderator of the General Assembly of the Church of Scotland the highest position in the Scottish Church. He was succeeded in turn by William Robertson.

Trail died in Glasgow on 17 October 1775. His position at Glasgow University was filled by Rev Dr James Baillie.

== Family ==
In November 1747 he married Christian Thomson daughter of Rev Thomas Thomson of Auchtermuchty. No children are recorded.
