= C. Bingham Newland =

Cressy Bingham Newland (1852 – 1921) was a British naturalist and writer.

Newland is best known for his book, What is Instinct? Some Thoughts on Telepathy and Subconsciousness in Animals, published in 1916.

Newland used the analogy of the Marconi wireless system to understand instinctual behavior amongst animals. Newland equated the immaterial or unseen to an instinctive subconscious mind within a group of animals which provided the behavior of nesting, migration, homing instincts, stampedes and swarming. Newland cited examples of instinctual behavior from insects, moths, flies, birds and fish which he believed was evidence for a telepathic process such as telaesthesia. He defined telaesthesia as "perception at a distance or power of vision transcending time and space". Newland held the view that all animals are incarnate fragments of an "all mind" and that members of a flock are thus directed by common intelligence.

A review in the Nature journal commented that Newland has many interesting observations but "he has ventured on a line of interpretation where verification is impossible" and his ideas were "too metaphysical". Another review suggested that "Mr Newland can scarely expect biologists to adopt his theory... though we cannot take the philosophy of this book seriously, yet it constitutes pleasant reading, on account of its original observations and genuine feelings for nature."

Newland died in 1921.

== Selected publications ==
- What is Instinct? Some Thoughts on Telepathy and Subconsciousness in Animals (1916)
