= Lady Yester's Kirk =

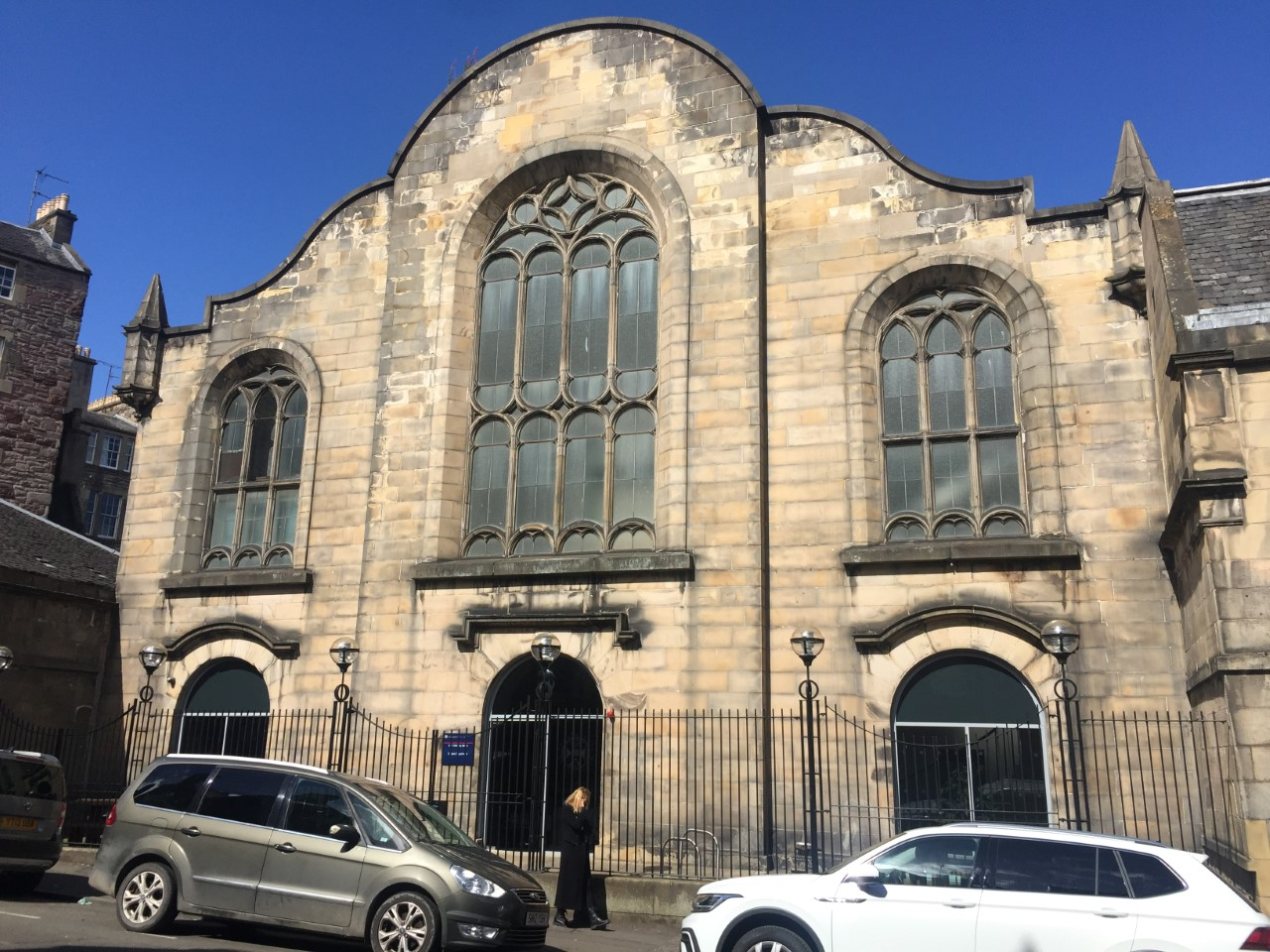
- Lady Yester's Kirk
- 55°56′54.6″N 3°11′6.5″W
- Location: Edinburgh
- Country: Scotland
- Denomination: Church of Scotland

History
- Founded: 1647
- Founder(s): Margaret, Lady Yester

Architecture
- Functional status: Closed
- Architect: William Sibbald
- Style: Jacobean
- Groundbreaking: 1803
- Completed: 1805
- Closed: 1938

Lady Yester's Kirk was a parish church of the Church of Scotland and one of the burgh churches of Edinburgh. Founded in 1647, it served the south-eastern part of Edinburgh's Old Town until its union with Greyfriars Kirk in 1938.

Margaret, Lady Yester gave a benefaction to establish the church in 1647; though a parish and minister were not allotted to the church until 1655. It was again without a regular congregation between 1662 and 1691. A secession from the congregation in 1764 led to the formation of Edinburgh's first Relief congregation. The church was notable for its close connection to the nearby University of Edinburgh and three of its ministers served as the university's principal. Though the Disruption of 1843 little affected the church, improvement works and population movement in the latter half of the 19th century and the early 20th century depleted the congregation. In 1938, the congregation united with Greyfriars Kirk. The building was sold to the university, which continues to use it as the headquarters of its Estates Department.

The church building was completed in 1805 to a Jacobean design by William Sibbald. It incorporates and imitates some features of the original church, which stood slightly to the east. The first church included the burial aisle of Lady Yester. An elaborate Renaissance plaque which stood over her grave is now housed in Greyfriars Kirk.

== History ==
=== Seventeenth century ===
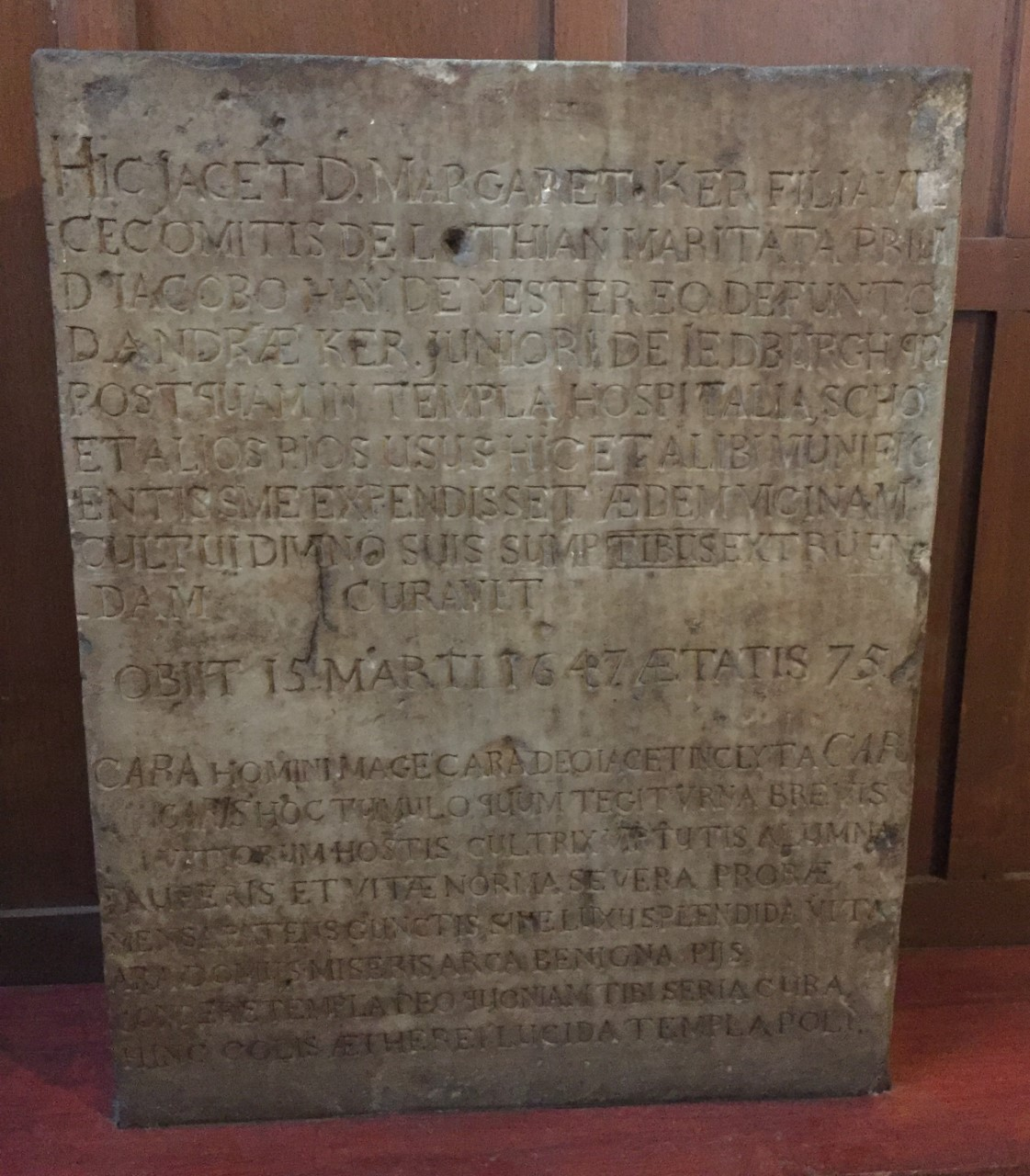
The stone which once marked the location of Lady Yester's burial, now housed in Greyfriars Kirk

The church was named for Margaret, Lady Hay of Yester. Lady Hay was a daughter of Mark Kerr, 1st Earl of Lothian and the widow of James Hay, 7th Lord Hay of Yester. On her husband's death, she assumed the name Lady Yester: Master of Yester being a title held in courtesy by her eldest son. In 1635, the town council moved to erect two new churches: the one that become the Tron Kirk and another at Castlehill. When funds proved insufficient for both, the Castlehill project was abandoned and funds and efforts redirected towards the completion of the Tron. Lady Yester funded the completion of the Tron and gave money for the church that would bear her name. Her donation consisted of 10,000 merks for the church and a further 5,000 merks to maintain the minister. When, in 1647, the town council informed Lady Yester that almost all of the 15,000 merks would be used to build the church, she left an annual maintenance of 1,000 merks for the minister.

During Cromwell's occupation of Edinburgh, his troops used the church as barracks and ransacked it. In 1655, part of the area of the Tron Kirk parish was detached to create a parish for Lady Yester's. This was bounded in the west by Peebles Wynd (now Blair Street) and College Wynd and to the east by the Cowgate Port. It encompassed all closes on the north side of the Cowgate that were not thoroughfares and stretched southwards from the Cowgate to the Flodden Wall. A minister, John Stirling of the Tron, was appointed at the same time but, at the re-establishment of episcopacy following the Restoration, he was deprived of his position and the parish was annexed by the Tron. During this period, the church was not used for regular worship; though laureations (graduations) of the nearby town college were held here.

From 1686, following the revocation of the Edict of Nantes, the church was also used by a French Protestant congregation. That year, the town council commissioned two Huguenot furniture makers, Paul Roumieu senior and Peter Pittit, to repair the church. From 1687, the congregation of Holyrood Abbey occupied the church following their displacement from their place of worship by James VII. With the completion of the Canongate Kirk, the Holyrood congregation moved out in 1691. That year, Lady Yester's parish was reinstated and Thomas Wilkie of the Tolbooth was appointed minister. Lady Yester's continued to serve as the main church for the college. The Janitor, bearing the mace, would lead the professors in procession to worship.

=== 1700–1843 ===
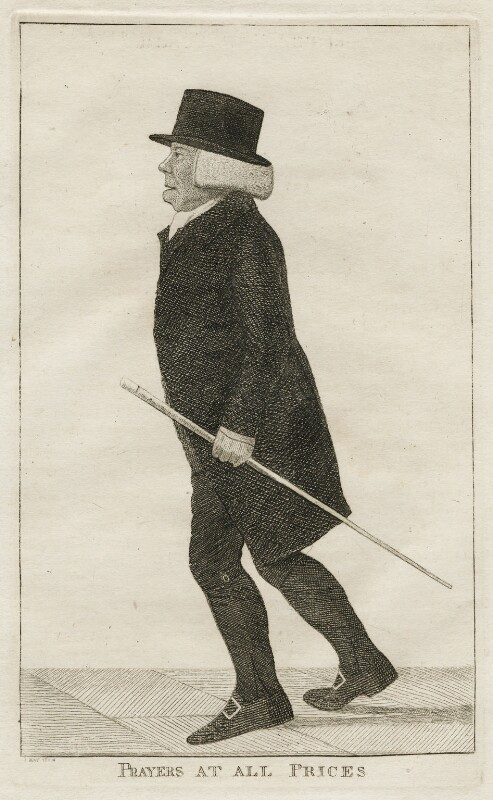
Mungo Watson, notable beadle of Lady Yester's at the turn of the 19th century

In December 1762, the death of John Hyndman left a vacancy in the church's ministry. To fill this, the town council used its right of patronage to appoint John Drysdale against the wishes of the General Sessions, which usually elected ministers to the burgh churches. The Court of Session and House of Lords both found Drysdale's presentation was valid and he was inducted to the charge on 24 August 1764. The controversy saw several members leave Lady Yester's and form Edinburgh's first Relief congregation, which eventually settled nearby at South College Street. In the later 18th century, the church's beadle was Mungo Watson. Noted for his schemes to extract profits as beadle of Lady Yester's and as doorman to the General Assembly, he was caricatured by John Kay with the caption "Prayers at All Prices".

In late 1803, the congregation expressed concerns about the stability of the students' gallery. The building was inspected and immediately condemned. Thomas Bonnar both purchased the old church and constructed the new one. The new church, constructed to the west of its predecessor, opened on 8 December 1805. Rumours circulated that the old church's condemnation was a means for Bonnar to make a profit by building the new church on the cheap, reusing many of its predecessor's materials. The accusations appeared to be founded when, as early as 1825, the church required a new roof. During the period of closure to replace the roof, the congregation met at Hope Park Chapel. A group of Anti-Burghers opposed to the creation of the United Secession Church built a chapel on the site of the old church.

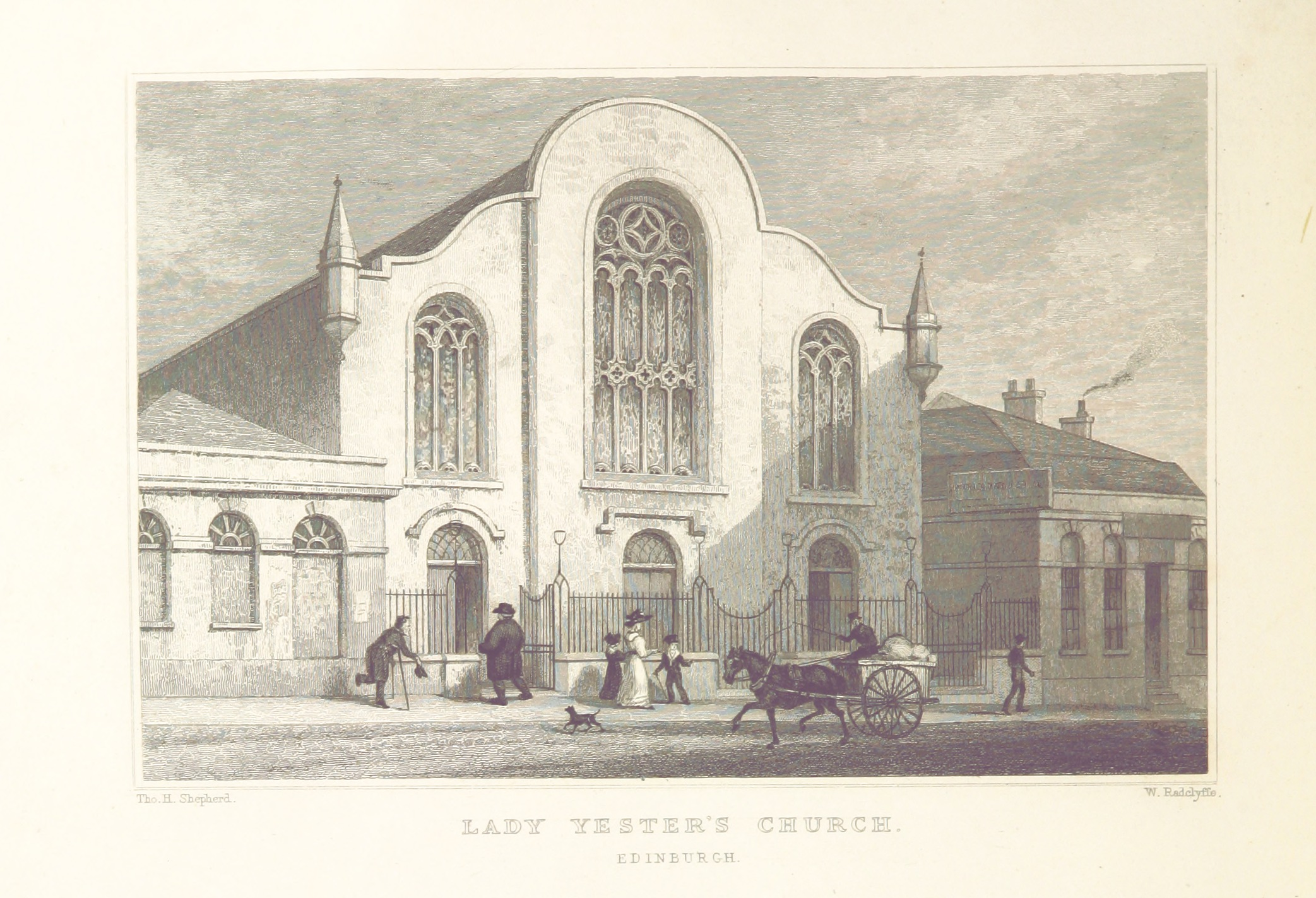
The church in the 1820s

During the incumbency of Thomas Fleming from 1806 to 1824, the church was one of the best attended in the city. In Hunter's time, the church established its first, albeit short-lived, Sabbath school. The school was established in response to an appeal by the Presbytery of Edinburgh, issued after a riot on New Year's Day 1812, during which a murder was committed and three boys were executed.

Following Fleming's death, the town council imposed John Lee as minister against the wishes of the congregation, who had requested the services of Robert Gordon. This caused the departure of a large portion of the congregation and a decline in attendance. Attendance recovered significantly during the ministry of Lee's successor Archibald Bennie. In 1837, the church was allocated a new parish, bounded by the Cowgate in the north, West College Street and College Wynd in the west, and the city wall in the south and east. During the early 19th century, noted physician John Abercrombie worshipped at the church, as did the bookseller David Laing.

=== Last years ===
Bennie and almost all his congregation remained in the national church at the Disruption of 1843. Bennie introduced private tuition for children, which was formalised as a Congregational School shortly after his death in 1846. In 1848, a Parochial School was also established. Bennie also founded a Female Society. A Missionary Association followed, as did a Sabbath Morning Fellowship Association in 1859 and a Penny Savings Bank in 1862. Bennie was succeeded by John Caird, who later served as principal of the University of Glasgow. Caird attracted a large number of students to the congregation. He was so popular as a preacher that, during his ministry, admission to the church was by ticket only.

In 1859, the addition to the parish of a portion of St Leonard's between St Leonard's Lane and Brown Street was proposed but never advanced; the following year, management of Edinburgh's burgh churches, including Lady Yester's, passed from the city council to the city's Ecclesiastical Commissioners. By this time, city improvements were massively altering the southern part of the Old Town and Chambers Street was cut through Lady Yester's parish, depleting the area's population and the church's congregation.

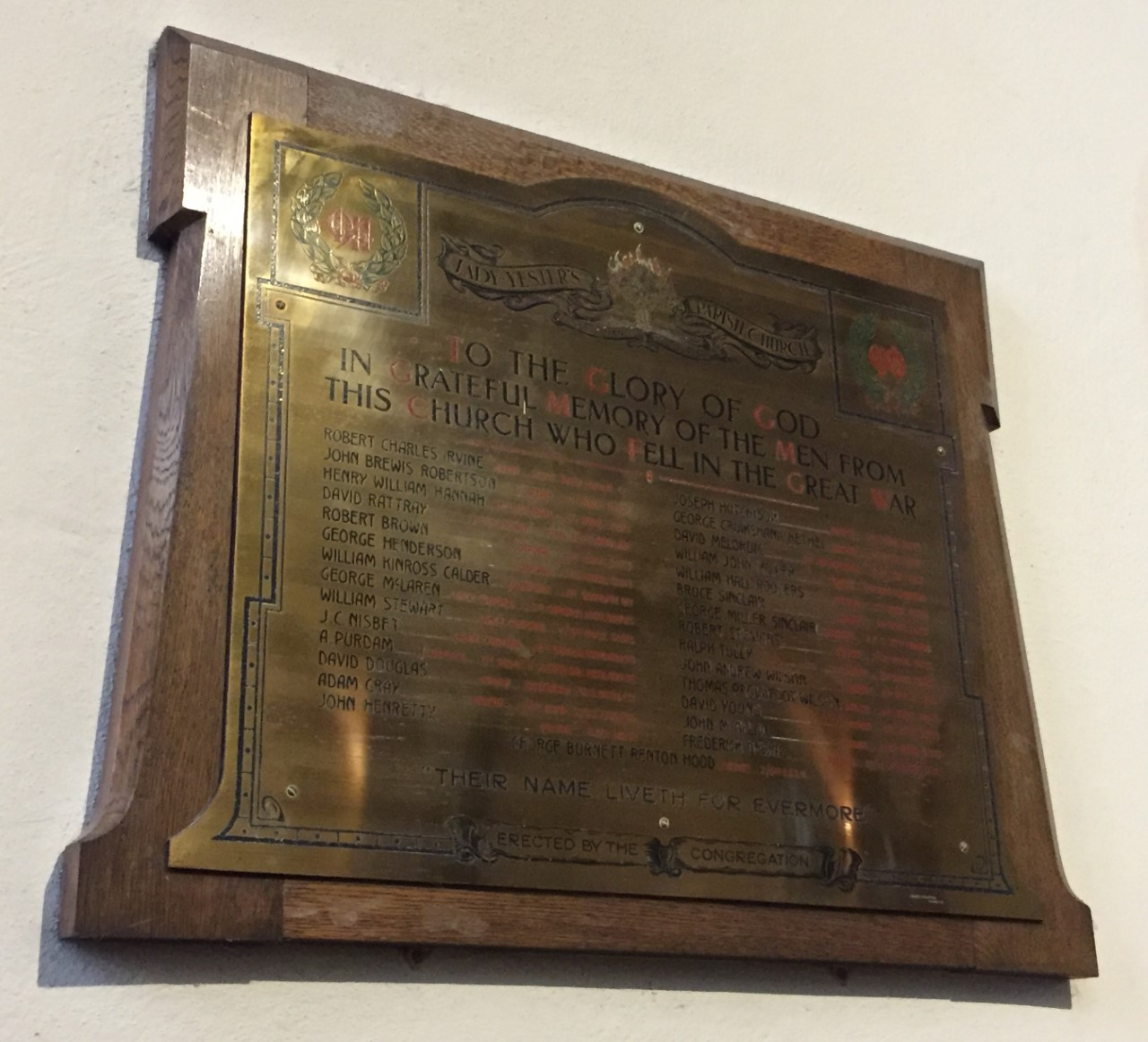
The church's First World War memorial

This processed continued throughout the early 20th century. Following the union of the Church of Scotland and the United Free Church of Scotland in 1929, there proved an extraneous number of churches in the Old Town and Southside. In this context, the congregation united with Greyfriars Kirk on 3 July 1938. The church and hall were sold to the city council who, in turn, gave them to the University of Edinburgh's for the use of the Works Department. The building is now the headquarters of the university's Estates Department.

== Ministers ==
Until the erection of St Mary's, Bellevue in 1824, Lady Yester's and New Greyfriars were the only two of the eight burgh churches to have one minister rather than two. As at New Greyfriars, the council often introduced young ministers to the charge in the hope of introducing them to one of the less onerous collegiate charges soon after. As a result, many ministers of New Greyfriars served short incumbencies and many achieved notability only later in their careers.

Evincing the church's close connection to the university, three ministers of the church - John Gowdie, William Robertson, and John Lee - served as principal of the University of Edinburgh. One minister, John Hyndman, was moderator of the General Assembly during his incumbency, serving in the role in 1761. Another, Thomas Randall, was the grandfather of Randall Davidson, archbishop of Canterbury.

The following ministers served Lady Yester's Kirk:

1655–1662 John Stirling
1691–1708 Thomas Wilkie
1708–1721 William Millar
1721–1730 John Gowdie
1732–1733 Archibald Gibson
1733–1736 William Robertson
1736–1750 Robert Hamilton
1720–1754 John Jardine
1754–1758 Hugh Blair
1758–1761 William Robertson
1761–1762 John Hyndman
1764–1767 John Drysdale
1767–1772 William Gloag
1772–1778 James MacKnight
1778–1785 Thomas Randall
1785–1789 William Simpson
1790–1794 James Finlayson
1794–1806 David Black
1806–1824 Thomas Fleming
1825–1835 John Lee
1835–1846 Archibald Bennie
1847–1849 John Caird
1850–1880 William Henry Gray
1880–1923 Charles MacGregor
1910–1918 John Morrison McLuckie
1918–1938 George Simpson Marr

== Buildings ==
=== First building and churchyard ===
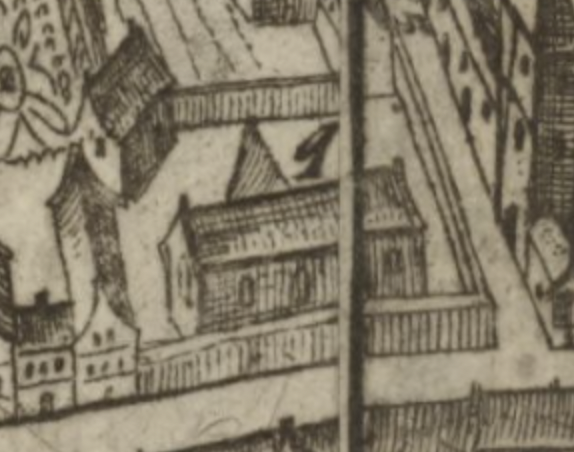
Lady Yester's Kirk, Edinburgh, on James Gordon of Rothiemay's 1647 map

Little detail survives as to the appearance of the first church. James Gordon of Rothiemay's 1647 plan of Edinburgh shows Lady Yester's as a large, cruciform building; as does William Edgar's Edinburgh map of 1742. The church's facade included a large, round-headed traceried window. The design of this window was replicated in the new church.

Prior to her death, Lady Yester ordered the addition of an aisle to the church, which would go on to serve as the place of her burial. It is not recorded that Lady Yester's remains were removed when the old church was demolished. The church's ceiling was wooden and one of the old building's last surviving worshippers recalled that it was painted with a depiction of the Last Judgement. It was originally without galleries; though these were added, including one for use by the students of the university. The church could accommodated 817 sittings.

Edgar's map of 1742 shows the church as being surrounded by a large churchyard. This was surrounded by boundary walls and only accessible via a gate at High School Wynd (now Infirmary Street). From 1749, part of the churchyard was used for the burial of the dead of the neighbouring Royal Infirmary.

=== Second building ===
The second church was constructed between 1803 and 1805 to a design of William Sibbald. The church's form is similar to the Canongate Kirk and its detail imitates the post-Gothic style of the 1640s. The façade, in ashlar, consists of a Dutch gable facade of three bays with short pinnacles on the corners. The middle bay is slightly advanced. The ground floor of each bay includes a round-headed door under a hoodmould. Above these are round-headed windows in simple surrounds. The tracery of the central window imitates that of the original church.

Sibbald's plan also included detached pavilions on either side of the church, facing onto Infirmary Street. These originally served as shops. With the replacement of the roof in 1825, the church's walls were raised by 8 ft (2.4 m). A monumental plaque featuring a putto's head has been retained in the east wall. A hall was later constructed next to the church. A two-manual Wadsworth organ was installed in 1888 and rebuilt by Ingram & Co. in 1924.

Lady Yester's has been a Category B listed building since 17 July 1974.

=== Features and plate ===
In the first church, a stone plaque lay over Lady Yester's grave in the burial aisle. This was moved to the west wall of the lobby of the second church then to Greyfriars Kirk following Lady Yester's secularisation. A further memorial stone stood near the entry of the aisle and a stone inscribed with Lady Yester's coat of arms stood over the door of the aisle. In the new church, these were moved to the east wall of the lobby and to the exterior east wall respectively. The church also possessed a memorial bust of Archibald Bennie, which stood in the lobby.

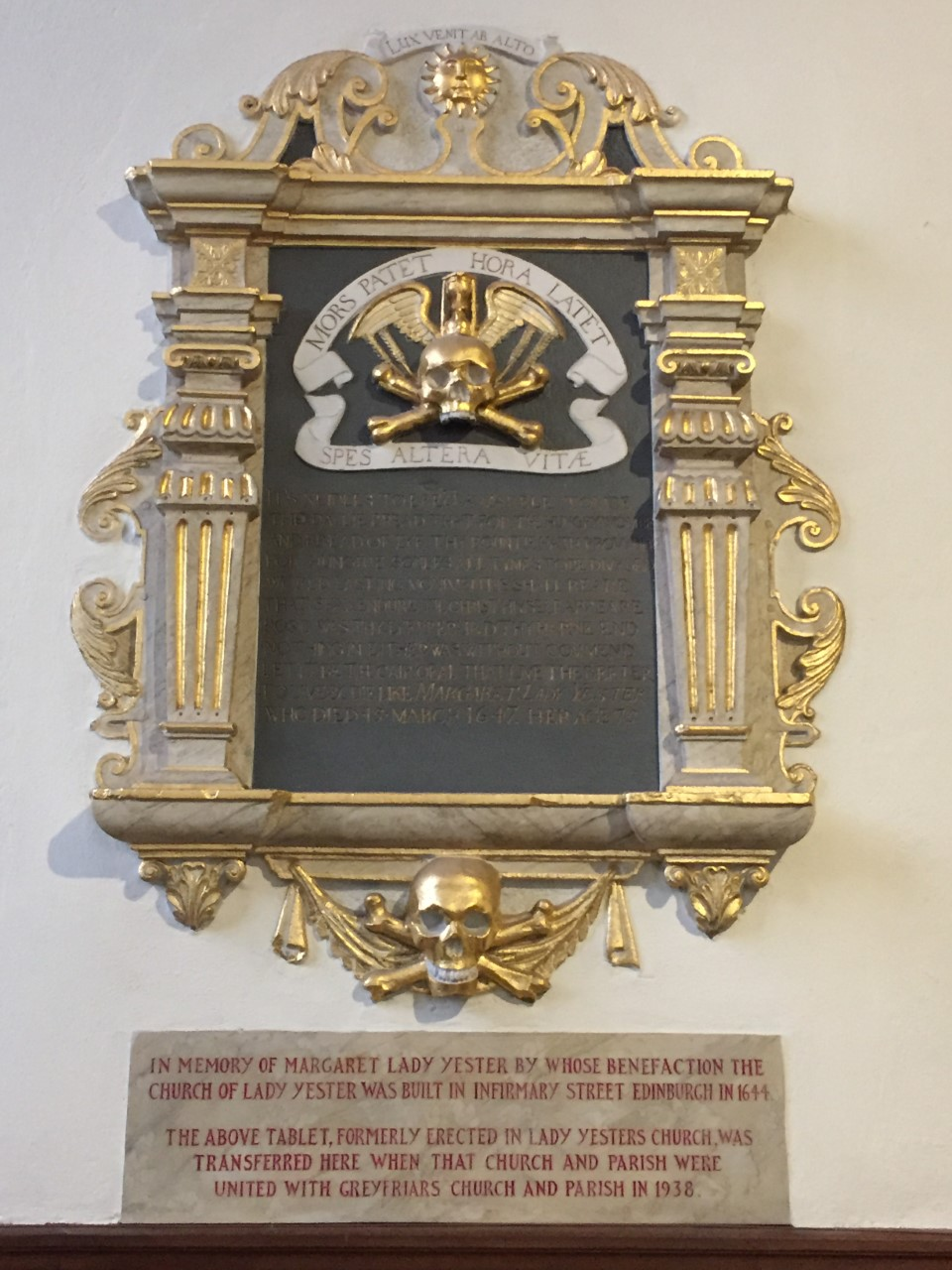
Lady Yester's memorial tablet, now housed in the Lady Yster's Aisle of Greyfriars Kirk

A monumental plaque also stood over Lady Yester's grave. This was re-erected in the session room of the new church. The monument is Renaissance in style and in the form of an aedicule. At the bottom of the plaque is a skull and crossbones on a swag. The monument is crowned by a broken, scrolled pediment centring on the family's Crest (heraldry): a sun in splendour beneath a banderole bearing the family motto "LUX VENIT AB ALTO" ("light comes from on high"). The central panel is framed by two Renaissance pillars and features at its top a skull and crossbones below an hourglass, wings, and blades of corn in relief. This motif is surrounded by a banderole bearing the mottoes "MORS PATET HORA LATET" ("death is sure, the hour is hid") at the top and "SPES ALTERA VITÆ" ("hope of another life"). The panel is inscribed:

ITS NEIDLES TO ERECT A MARBLE TOMBE
THE DAYLIE BREAD THAT FOR THE HUNGRY WOMBE
AND BREAD OF LYF THY BOUNTY HATH PROVYDED
FOR HUNGRIE SOULES ALL TYMES TO BE DIVYDED
WORLD LASTING MONIMENTIS SHALL REARE
THAT SHAL ENDURE TIL CHRIST HIMSELF APPEARE
POS'D WAS THY LYF PREPAR'D THY HAPPIE END
NOTHING IN EITHER WAS WITHOUT COMMEND
LET IT BE THE CAIR OF AL THAT LIVE THERE EFTER
TO LIVE & DIE LIKE MARGARET LADY YESTER
WHO DIED 15 MARCH 1647 HER AGE 75

Following the secularisation of Lady Yester's, the monumental plaque was moved to the southern wall of the eastern end of the southern aisle of Greyfriars Kirk. This space in Greyfriars is known as the Lady Yester's Aisle and also contains Lady Yester's eagle lectern, carved from a single block of oak. Lady Yester's brass First World War memorial plaque is also mounted on the wall of this aisle. It bears the names of 29 men of the parish fallen in the war.

The church possessed four communion cups inscribed "July 1708. For the use of the Lady Yester's Kirk in Edinburgh. The gift of Mr Thomas Wilkie, who was minister thereof." It also possessed two collection basins, the smaller inscribed "Iohn Nicholson, bookseller in Edinburgh, gifted this basin for the use of Lady Yester's Kirk, 1703", the larger is inscribed "Lady Yester's kirk, 1711".
