= John Lee (university principal) =

Scottish academic and polymath

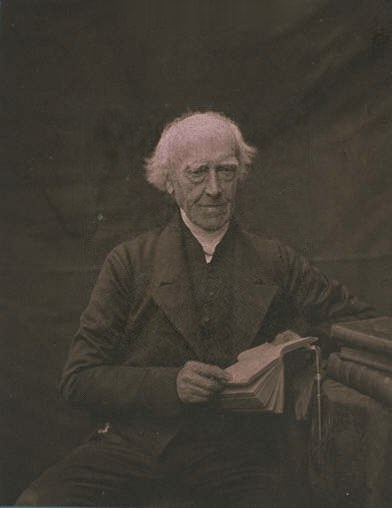
- John Lee, around 1850.
- Born: 23 November 1779; Torwoodlee-Mains
- Died: 2 May 1859 (aged 79); Edinburgh
- Occupation: Principal of the University of Edinburgh

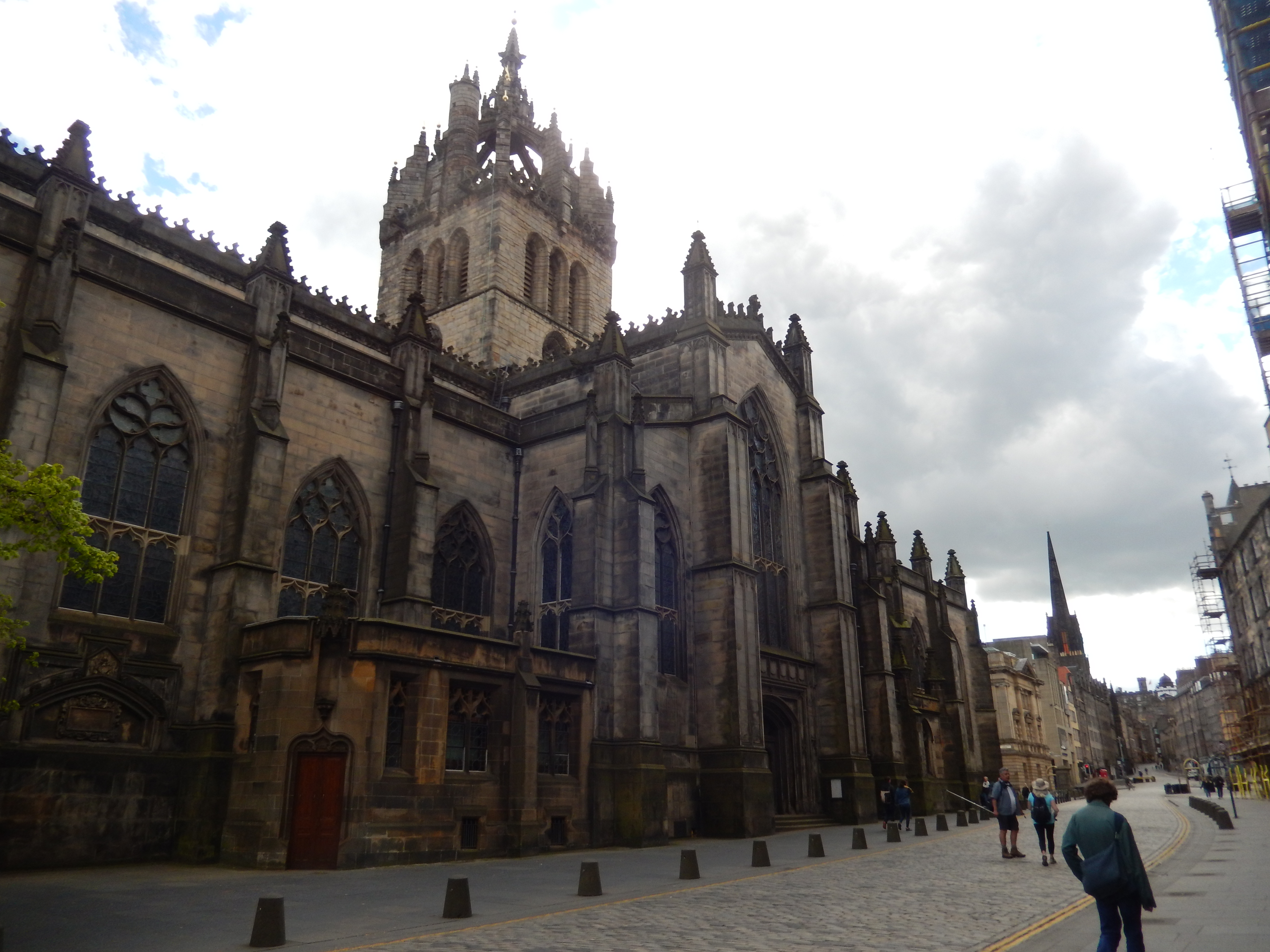
St Giles Cathedral

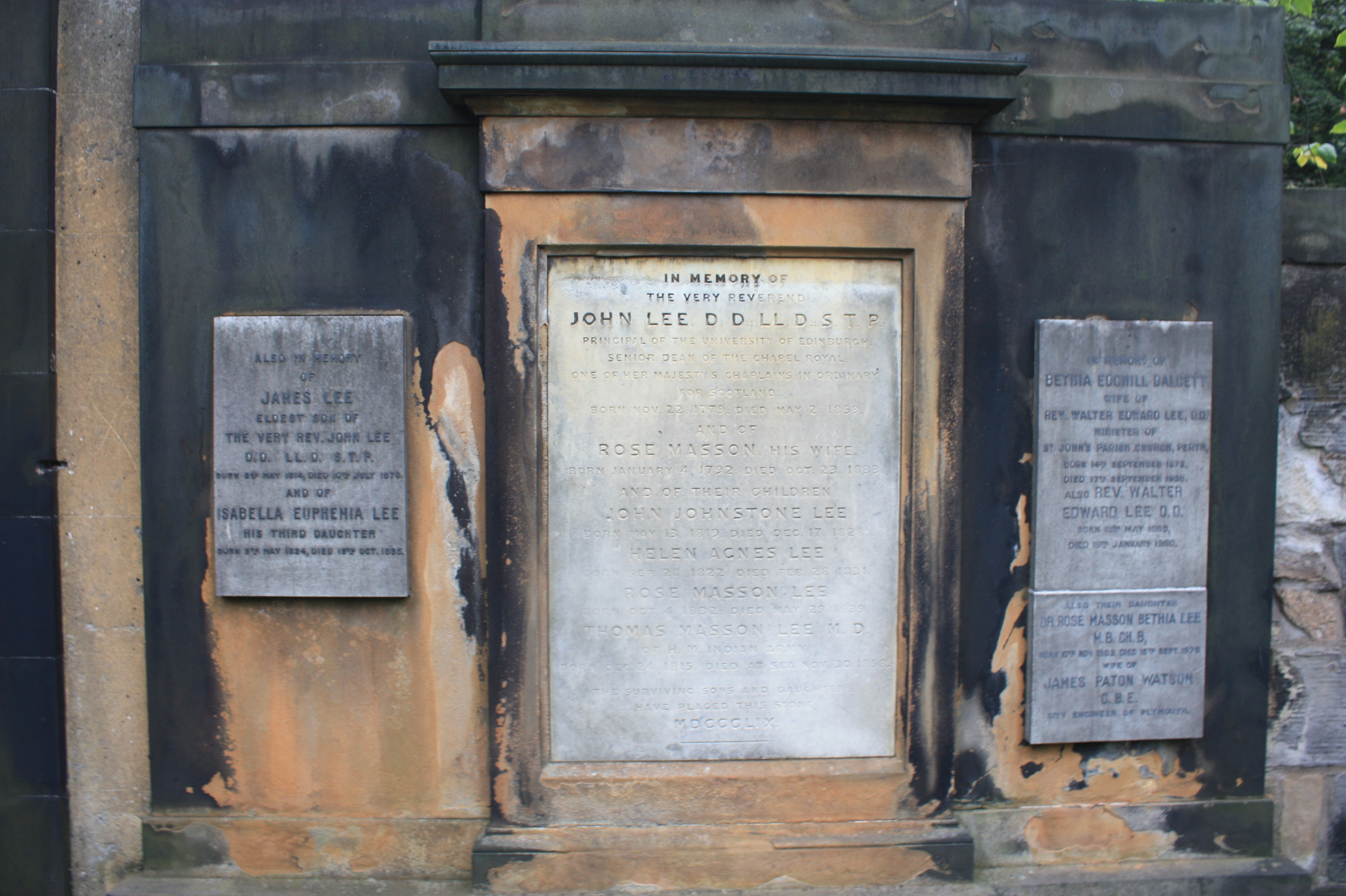
Grave of John Lee and family, St Cuthberts Churchyard, Edinburgh

Reverend Dr John Lee FRSE (22 November 1779 – 2 May 1859) was a Scottish academic and polymath, and the Principal of the University of Edinburgh from 1840 to 1859. He was Moderator of the General Assembly of the Church of Scotland in 1844.

Lee House in Pollock Halls of Residence is named after him.

== Life ==
Lee was born on 22 November 1779 at Graemeshills, Torwoodlee Mains, a farm in the parish of Stow in the Scottish Borders, the son of Helen Paterson and James Lee, a weaver. He attended school at the "luggie" in Clovenfords, his teacher was John Leyden.

In 1794, he entered the University of Edinburgh, studying medicine, and supported himself by teaching. In 1801, he graduated with an MD. After serving for a short time as a surgeon/apothecary in an army hospital service he started studying law. However, in 1804 he became amanuensis (literary assistant) to the Rev. Alexander Carlyle ("Jupiter Carlyle") in Inveresk. On his death in 1805, Carlyle who gave Lee the manuscript of his autobiography.

Lee was licensed by the Presbytery of Dalkeith as a Church of Scotland minister in 1804 but failed to find a patron. After acting for a few months as pastor of a Presbyterian chapel on Hanover Street in London he was ordained as minister of Peebles Parish church in April 1808 in place of Rev Dr William Dalgleish. In 1812 he was appointed Professor of Divinity and Ecclesiastical History at St Mary's College, St Andrews, and was there also chosen as Rector of the college. In 1820 he became Professor of Moral Philosophy in King's College, Aberdeen, but his lectures there were mostly delivered by a deputy. He continued to lecture at the University of St Andrews intending to travel regularly between the two, however, he had a change of heart following a near-fatal accident when his coach overturned en route to Aberdeen.

In 1821, Lee resigned both professorships and, aided by the granting of an honorary Doctor of Divinity from the University of St Andrews, accepted a position as minister of the Canongate Church in Edinburgh.

He was elected a Fellow of the Royal Society of Edinburgh in 1822, his proposer being George Forbes. He served the Society as their Literary Councillor (1823-6) and as the Vice-President (1842–1859).

In 1825 he was translated from the Canongate to Lady Yester's Church in south Edinburgh, and was appointed a chaplain in ordinary to the king in 1830. He was made Principal Clerk of the General Assembly in 1827, but unsuccessfully contested the moderatorship with Thomas Chalmers in 1832. In 1834 he became minister of the Old Kirk, one of the four churches then contained in St. Giles Cathedral, in 1837 Principal of the United College, St Andrews, and in 1840 Dean of the Chapel Royal in Stirling. In 1840, also, he was elected Principal of the University of Edinburgh. He was then living at 16 Abercromby Place in Edinburgh's second New Town a large Georgian townhouse.

When the Disruption of 1843 took place, Lee remained in the established Church of Scotland. He undertook to conduct the divinity class, and shortly afterwards was made Professor of Divinity in succession to Thomas Chalmers, holding this office concurrently with his Principalship. He was elected Moderator of the General Assembly of the Church of Scotland in 1844.

Lee died in his lodgings at New College at the University of Edinburgh on 2 May 1859. He is buried in the south-west section of St Cuthberts Churchyard in Edinburgh, next to the Balfour Paul monument.

== Family ==
Lee was married to Rose Masson (1792-1833) daughter of Thomas Masson minister of Dunnichen north of Dundee.

Lee's children included:

- James Lee (1814-1870)
- Thomas Masson Lee MD IMS (1815-1858)
- Ref Prof William Lee (1817-1886) Professor of Church History at Glasgow University
- John Johnston Lee (1819-1828)
- Jane Lee (b.1821)
- Helen Agnes Lee (1822-1831)
- Isabella Euphemia Lee (1824-1895)
- David Henry Lee (b.1826)
- Alexander Henderson Lee CE (b.1828-1901))
- Robert Lee, Lord Lee (1830-1890),
- Rose Masson Lee (1832-1839)

In 1841 Lee married Charlotte E. Wright (d.1871).

== Works ==
Lee was accomplished in almost every branch of knowledge, especially in Scottish literary and ecclesiastical history. He collected a library of twenty thousand volumes. He was caricatured by John Hill Burton in the Book Hunter as Archdeacon Meadows the bibliomaniac, who would buy a book of which he had several copies already, and then, not being able to find any of his copies, would have to borrow the same book from a friend for reference.

Lee's doctoral thesis was De viribus animi in corpus agentibus. His main works were:

- Six sermons, 1829.
- Memorial for of the Bible Societies in Scotland, 1826.
- Dr. Lee's Refutation of Charges brought against him by the Rev. Dr. Chalmers, in reference to the questions on Church Extension and University Education, 1837.
- Lectures on the History of the Church of Scotland, 1860.
- The University of Edinburgh from 1583 to 1839, 1884.

Lee also edited tracts by David Fergusson for the Bannatyne Club in 1860.

== Sources ==
Macphail's Edinburgh ecclesiastical journal and literary review. s.n. 1862. p. 2. "john lee."

Academic offices
Preceded by George Husband Baird	Edinburgh University Principals; 1840–1859	Succeeded by Sir David Brewster
